= 2023 Critérium du Dauphiné =

French cycling race

2023 UCI World Tour, race 23 of 35

Race details
- Dates: 4–11 June 2023
- Stages: 8
- Distance: 1,214.1 km (754.4 mi)
- Winning time: 29h 28' 39"

Results
Jersey awarded to the overall winner	Winner	Jonas Vingegaard (DEN)	(Team Jumbo–Visma)
	Second	Adam Yates (GBR)	(UAE Team Emirates)
	Third	Ben O'Connor (AUS)	(AG2R Citroën Team)
Jersey awarded to the points classification winner	Points	Christophe Laporte (FRA)	(Team Jumbo–Visma)
Jersey awarded to the mountains classification winner	Mountains	Giulio Ciccone (ITA)	(Trek–Segafredo)
Jersey awarded to the young rider classification winner	Young rider	Carlos Rodríguez (ESP)	(INEOS Grenadiers)
	Team	(United Kingdom) INEOS Grenadiers	

The 2023 Critérium du Dauphiné was a road cycling stage race that took place between 4 and 11 June 2023 in the Dauphiné region of southeastern France. It was the 75th edition of Critérium du Dauphiné and the 23rd race of the 2023 UCI World Tour.

== Teams ==
All 18 UCI WorldTeams and three UCI ProTeams made up the 21 teams that participated in the race.

UCI WorldTeams

- AG2R Citroën Team
- Alpecin–Deceuninck
- Arkéa–Samsic
- Astana Qazaqstan Team
- Bora–Hansgrohe
- Cofidis
- EF Education–EasyPost
- Groupama–FDJ
- INEOS Grenadiers
- Intermarché–Circus–Wanty
- Movistar Team
- Soudal–Quick-Step
- Team Bahrain Victorious
- Team DSM
- Team Jayco–AlUla
- Team Jumbo–Visma
- Trek–Segafredo
- UAE Team Emirates

UCI ProTeams

- Lotto–Dstny
- Team TotalEnergies
- Uno-X Pro Cycling Team

== Route ==
Stage characteristics and winners
Stage	Date	Course	Distance	Type	Stage winner
1	4 June	Chambon-sur-Lac to Chambon-sur-Lac	158 km (98 mi)	Hilly stage	Christophe Laporte (FRA)
2	5 June	Brassac-les-Mines to La Chaise-Dieu	167.5 km (104.1 mi)	Hilly stage	Julian Alaphilippe (FRA)
3	6 June	Monistrol-sur-Loire to Le Coteau	194.5 km (120.9 mi)	Hilly stage	Christophe Laporte (FRA)
4	7 June	Cours to Belmont-de-la-Loire	31.1 km (19.3 mi)	Individual time trial	Mikkel Bjerg (DEN)
5	8 June	Cormoranche-sur-Saône to Salins-les-Bains	191.5 km (119.0 mi)	Hilly stage	Jonas Vingegaard (DEN)
6	9 June	Nantua to Crest-Voland	170.5 km (105.9 mi)	Mountain stage	Georg Zimmermann (GER)
7	10 June	Porte-de-Savoie to Col de la Croix de Fer (Saint Sorlin)	148 km (92 mi)	Mountain stage	Jonas Vingegaard (DEN)
8	11 June	Le Pont-de-Claix to La Bastille	153 km (95 mi)	Mountain stage	Giulio Ciccone (ITA)
Total			1,214.1 km (754.4 mi)		

== Stages ==
=== Stage 1 ===
4 June 2023 — Chambon-sur-Lac to Chambon-sur-Lac, 158 km (98 mi)

Stage 1 Result
Rank	Rider	Team	Time
1	Christophe Laporte (FRA)	Team Jumbo–Visma	3h 43' 30"
2	Matteo Trentin (ITA)	UAE Team Emirates	+ 0"
3	Rune Herregodts (BEL)	Intermarché–Circus–Wanty	+ 0"
4	Axel Zingle (FRA)	Cofidis	+ 0"
5	Maxim Van Gils (BEL)	Lotto–Dstny	+ 0"
6	Danny van Poppel (NED)	Bora–Hansgrohe	+ 0"
7	Andrea Bagioli (ITA)	Soudal–Quick-Step	+ 0"
8	Fred Wright (GBR)	Team Bahrain Victorious	+ 0"
9	Robert Stannard (AUS)	Alpecin–Deceuninck	+ 0"
10	Marco Brenner (GER)	Team DSM	+ 0"

General classification after Stage 1
Rank	Rider	Team	Time
1	Christophe Laporte (FRA)	Team Jumbo–Visma	3h 43' 20"
2	Matteo Trentin (ITA)	UAE Team Emirates	+ 4"
3	Rune Herregodts (BEL)	Intermarché–Circus–Wanty	+ 6"
4	Axel Zingle (FRA)	Cofidis	+ 10"
5	Maxim Van Gils (BEL)	Lotto–Dstny	+ 10"
6	Danny van Poppel (NED)	Bora–Hansgrohe	+ 10"
7	Andrea Bagioli (ITA)	Soudal–Quick-Step	+ 10"
8	Fred Wright (GBR)	Team Bahrain Victorious	+ 10"
9	Robert Stannard (AUS)	Alpecin–Deceuninck	+ 10"
10	Marco Brenner (GER)	Team DSM	+ 10"

=== Stage 2 ===
5 June 2023 – Brassac-les-Mines to La Chaise-Dieu, 167.5 km (104.1 mi)

Stage 2 Result
Rank	Rider	Team	Time
1	Julian Alaphilippe (FRA)	Soudal–Quick-Step	3h 54' 53"
2	Richard Carapaz (ECU)	EF Education–EasyPost	+ 0"
3	Natnael Tesfatsion (ERI)	Trek–Segafredo	+ 0"
4	Christophe Laporte (FRA)	Team Jumbo–Visma	+ 0"
5	Maxim Van Gils (BEL)	Lotto–Dstny	+ 0"
6	Robert Stannard (AUS)	Alpecin–Deceuninck	+ 0"
7	Fred Wright (GBR)	Team Bahrain Victorious	+ 0"
8	Oscar Onley (GBR)	Team DSM	+ 0"
9	Marco Brenner (GER)	Team DSM	+ 0"
10	Clément Champoussin (FRA)	Arkéa–Samsic	+ 0"

General classification after Stage 2
Rank	Rider	Team	Time
1	Christophe Laporte (FRA)	Team Jumbo–Visma	7h 38' 13"
2	Julian Alaphilippe (FRA)	Soudal–Quick-Step	+ 0"
3	Richard Carapaz (ECU)	EF Education–EasyPost	+ 4"
4	Rune Herregodts (BEL)	Intermarché–Circus–Wanty	+ 6"
5	Maxim Van Gils (BEL)	Lotto–Dstny	+ 10"
6	Robert Stannard (AUS)	Alpecin–Deceuninck	+ 10"
7	Fred Wright (GBR)	Team Bahrain Victorious	+ 10"
8	Marco Brenner (GER)	Team DSM	+ 10"
9	Clément Champoussin (FRA)	Arkéa–Samsic	+ 10"
10	Edvald Boasson Hagen (NOR)	Team TotalEnergies	+ 10"

=== Stage 3 ===
6 June 2023 – Monistrol-sur-Loire to Le Coteau, 194.5 km (120.9 mi)

Stage 3 Result
Rank	Rider	Team	Time
1	Christophe Laporte (FRA)	Team Jumbo–Visma	4h 43' 28"
2	Matteo Trentin (ITA)	UAE Team Emirates	+ 0"
3	Milan Menten (BEL)	Lotto–Dstny	+ 0"
4	Hugo Hofstetter (FRA)	Arkéa–Samsic	+ 0"
5	Matevž Govekar (SLO)	Team Bahrain Victorious	+ 0"
6	Tobias Bayer (AUT)	Alpecin–Deceuninck	+ 0"
7	Axel Zingle (FRA)	Cofidis	+ 0"
8	Madis Mihkels (EST)	Intermarché–Circus–Wanty	+ 0"
9	Martin Urianstad (NOR)	Uno-X Pro Cycling Team	+ 0"
10	Danny van Poppel (NED)	Bora–Hansgrohe	+ 0"

General classification after Stage 3
Rank	Rider	Team	Time
1	Christophe Laporte (FRA)	Team Jumbo–Visma	12h 21' 28"
2	Julian Alaphilippe (FRA)	Soudal–Quick-Step	+ 11"
3	Richard Carapaz (ECU)	EF Education–EasyPost	+ 17"
4	Rune Herregodts (BEL)	Intermarché–Circus–Wanty	+ 19"
5	Maxim Van Gils (BEL)	Lotto–Dstny	+ 23"
6	Fred Wright (GBR)	Team Bahrain Victorious	+ 23"
7	Marco Brenner (GER)	Team DSM	+ 23"
8	Edvald Boasson Hagen (NOR)	Team TotalEnergies	+ 23"
9	Tobias Halland Johannessen (NOR)	Uno-X Pro Cycling Team	+ 23"
10	Axel Zingle (FRA)	Cofidis	+ 23"

=== Stage 4 ===
7 June 2023 – Cours to Belmont-de-la-Loire (ITT), 31.1 km (19.3 mi)

Stage 4 Result
Rank	Rider	Team	Time
1	Mikkel Bjerg (DEN)	UAE Team Emirates	37' 28"
2	Jonas Vingegaard (DEN)	Team Jumbo–Visma	+ 12"
3	Rémi Cavagna (FRA)	Soudal–Quick-Step	+ 27"
4	Fred Wright (GBR)	Team Bahrain Victorious	+ 34"
5	Ben O'Connor (AUS)	AG2R Citroën Team	+ 41"
6	Felix Großschartner (AUT)	UAE Team Emirates	+ 44"
7	Rune Herregodts (BEL)	Intermarché–Circus–Wanty	+ 54"
8	Adam Yates (GBR)	UAE Team Emirates	+ 57"
9	Nelson Oliveira (POR)	Movistar Team	+ 1' 02"
10	Jonathan Castroviejo (ESP)	INEOS Grenadiers	+ 1' 05"

General classification after Stage 4
Rank	Rider	Team	Time
1	Mikkel Bjerg (DEN)	UAE Team Emirates	12h 59' 19"
2	Jonas Vingegaard (DEN)	Team Jumbo–Visma	+ 12"
3	Fred Wright (GBR)	Team Bahrain Victorious	+ 34"
4	Ben O'Connor (AUS)	AG2R Citroën Team	+ 41"
5	Felix Großschartner (AUT)	UAE Team Emirates	+ 44"
6	Rune Herregodts (BEL)	Intermarché–Circus–Wanty	+ 50"
7	Adam Yates (GBR)	UAE Team Emirates	+ 57"
8	Julian Alaphilippe (FRA)	Soudal–Quick-Step	+ 1' 00"
9	Daniel Martínez (COL)	INEOS Grenadiers	+ 1' 07"
10	Jai Hindley (AUS)	Bora–Hansgrohe	+ 1' 08"

=== Stage 5 ===
8 June 2023 – Cormoranche-sur-Saône to Salins-les-Bains, 191.5 km (119.0 mi)

Stage 5 Result
Rank	Rider	Team	Time
1	Jonas Vingegaard (DEN)	Team Jumbo–Visma	4h 03' 42"
2	Julian Alaphilippe (FRA)	Soudal–Quick-Step	+ 31"
3	Tobias Halland Johannessen (NOR)	Uno-X Pro Cycling Team	+ 31"
4	Clément Champoussin (FRA)	Arkéa–Samsic	+ 31"
5	Max Poole (GBR)	Team DSM	+ 31"
6	Jai Hindley (AUS)	Bora–Hansgrohe	+ 31"
7	Enric Mas (ESP)	Movistar Team	+ 31"
8	Adam Yates (GBR)	UAE Team Emirates	+ 31"
9	Lenny Martinez (FRA)	Groupama–FDJ	+ 31"
10	Esteban Chaves (COL)	EF Education–EasyPost	+ 31"

General classification after Stage 5
Rank	Rider	Team	Time
1	Jonas Vingegaard (DEN)	Team Jumbo–Visma	17h 03' 03"
2	Ben O'Connor (AUS)	AG2R Citroën Team	+ 1' 10"
3	Julian Alaphilippe (FRA)	Soudal–Quick-Step	+ 1' 23"
4	Adam Yates (GBR)	UAE Team Emirates	+ 1' 26"
5	Felix Großschartner (AUT)	UAE Team Emirates	+ 1' 27"
6	Jai Hindley (AUS)	Bora–Hansgrohe	+ 1' 37"
7	Jack Haig (AUS)	Team Bahrain Victorious	+ 1' 44"
8	Daniel Martínez (COL)	INEOS Grenadiers	+ 2' 07"
9	Mikkel Bjerg (DEN)	UAE Team Emirates	+ 2' 21"
10	Guillaume Martin (FRA)	Cofidis	+ 2' 54"

=== Stage 6 ===
9 June 2023 – Nantua to Crest-Voland, 170.5 km (105.9 mi)

Stage 6 Result
Rank	Rider	Team	Time
1	Georg Zimmermann (GER)	Intermarché–Circus–Wanty	4h 02' 50"
2	Mathieu Burgaudeau (FRA)	Team TotalEnergies	+ 1"
3	Jonathan Castroviejo (ESP)	INEOS Grenadiers	+ 8"
4	Giulio Ciccone (ITA)	Trek–Segafredo	+ 48"
5	Ben O'Connor (AUS)	AG2R Citroën Team	+ 48"
6	Adam Yates (GBR)	UAE Team Emirates	+ 48"
7	Jack Haig (AUS)	Team Bahrain Victorious	+ 48"
8	Jai Hindley (AUS)	Bora–Hansgrohe	+ 48"
9	Julian Alaphilippe (FRA)	Soudal–Quick-Step	+ 48"
10	Enric Mas (ESP)	Movistar Team	+ 48"

General classification after Stage 6
Rank	Rider	Team	Time
1	Jonas Vingegaard (DEN)	Team Jumbo–Visma	21h 06' 41"
2	Ben O'Connor (AUS)	AG2R Citroën Team	+ 1' 10"
3	Julian Alaphilippe (FRA)	Soudal–Quick-Step	+ 1' 23"
4	Adam Yates (GBR)	UAE Team Emirates	+ 1' 26"
5	Jai Hindley (AUS)	Bora–Hansgrohe	+ 1' 37"
6	Jack Haig (AUS)	Team Bahrain Victorious	+ 1' 44"
7	Daniel Martínez (COL)	INEOS Grenadiers	+ 2' 07"
8	Guillaume Martin (FRA)	Cofidis	+ 2' 54"
9	Mikkel Bjerg (DEN)	UAE Team Emirates	+ 2' 55"
10	Tobias Halland Johannessen (NOR)	Uno-X Pro Cycling Team	+ 2' 57"

=== Stage 7 ===
10 June 2023 – Porte-de-Savoie to Col de la Croix de Fer (Saint Sorlin), 148 km (92 mi)

Stage 7 Result
Rank	Rider	Team	Time
1	Jonas Vingegaard (DEN)	Team Jumbo–Visma	4h 15' 47"
2	Adam Yates (GBR)	UAE Team Emirates	+ 41"
3	Jai Hindley (AUS)	Bora–Hansgrohe	+ 53"
4	Ben O'Connor (AUS)	AG2R Citroën Team	+ 1' 04"
5	Max Poole (GBR)	Team DSM	+ 1' 10"
6	Jack Haig (AUS)	Team Bahrain Victorious	+ 1' 10"
7	Guillaume Martin (FRA)	Cofidis	+ 1' 10"
8	Torstein Træen (NOR)	Uno-X Pro Cycling Team	+ 1' 10"
9	Daniel Martínez (COL)	INEOS Grenadiers	+ 1' 10"
10	Louis Meintjes (RSA)	Intermarché–Circus–Wanty	+ 1' 10"

General classification after Stage 7
Rank	Rider	Team	Time
1	Jonas Vingegaard (DEN)	Team Jumbo–Visma	25h 22' 18"
2	Adam Yates (GBR)	UAE Team Emirates	+ 2' 11"
3	Ben O'Connor (AUS)	AG2R Citroën Team	+ 2' 24"
4	Jai Hindley (AUS)	Bora–Hansgrohe	+ 2' 36"
5	Jack Haig (AUS)	Team Bahrain Victorious	+ 3' 04"
6	Daniel Martínez (COL)	INEOS Grenadiers	+ 3' 27"
7	Julian Alaphilippe (FRA)	Soudal–Quick-Step	+ 3' 48"
8	Guillaume Martin (FRA)	Cofidis	+ 4' 14"
9	Louis Meintjes (RSA)	Intermarché–Circus–Wanty	+ 4' 19"
10	Torstein Træen (NOR)	Uno-X Pro Cycling Team	+ 4' 21"

=== Stage 8 ===
11 June 2023 – Le Pont-de-Claix to La Bastille, 153 km (95 mi)

Stage 8 Result
Rank	Rider	Team	Time
1	Giulio Ciccone (ITA)	Trek–Segafredo	4h 06' 04"
2	Jonas Vingegaard (DEN)	Team Jumbo–Visma	+ 23"
3	Adam Yates (GBR)	UAE Team Emirates	+ 33"
4	Ben O'Connor (AUS)	AG2R Citroën Team	+ 49"
5	Guillaume Martin (FRA)	Cofidis	+ 54"
6	Jai Hindley (AUS)	Bora–Hansgrohe	+ 57"
7	Rafał Majka (POL)	UAE Team Emirates	+ 1' 00"
8	Jack Haig (AUS)	Team Bahrain Victorious	+ 1' 00"
9	Louis Meintjes (RSA)	Intermarché–Circus–Wanty	+ 1' 00"
10	Carlos Rodríguez (ESP)	INEOS Grenadiers	+ 1' 03"

General classification after Stage 8
Rank	Rider	Team	Time
1	Jonas Vingegaard (DEN)	Team Jumbo–Visma	29h 28' 39"
2	Adam Yates (GBR)	UAE Team Emirates	+ 2' 23"
3	Ben O'Connor (AUS)	AG2R Citroën Team	+ 2' 56"
4	Jai Hindley (AUS)	Bora–Hansgrohe	+ 3' 16"
5	Jack Haig (AUS)	Team Bahrain Victorious	+ 3' 47"
6	Guillaume Martin (FRA)	Cofidis	+ 4' 51"
7	Louis Meintjes (RSA)	Intermarché–Circus–Wanty	+ 5' 02"
8	Torstein Træen (NOR)	Uno-X Pro Cycling Team	+ 5' 15"
9	Carlos Rodríguez (ESP)	INEOS Grenadiers	+ 5' 19"
10	Julian Alaphilippe (FRA)	Soudal–Quick-Step	+ 5' 37"

== Classification leadership table ==
Classification leadership by stage
Stage	Winner	General classification	Points classification	Mountains classification	Young rider classification	Team classification	Combativity award
1	Christophe Laporte	Christophe Laporte	Christophe Laporte	Donavan Grondin	Rune Herregodts	UAE Team Emirates	Dorian Godon
2	Julian Alaphilippe	Christophe Laporte	Christophe Laporte	Donavan Grondin	Rune Herregodts	UAE Team Emirates	Victor Campenaerts
3	Christophe Laporte	Christophe Laporte	Christophe Laporte	Donavan Grondin	Rune Herregodts	UAE Team Emirates	Mathieu Burgaudeau
4	Mikkel Bjerg	Mikkel Bjerg	Christophe Laporte	Donavan Grondin	Mikkel Bjerg	UAE Team Emirates	not awarded
5	Jonas Vingegaard	Jonas Vingegaard	Christophe Laporte	Donavan Grondin	Mikkel Bjerg	UAE Team Emirates	Richard Carapaz
6	Georg Zimmermann	Jonas Vingegaard	Christophe Laporte	Mathieu Burgaudeau	Mikkel Bjerg	UAE Team Emirates	Mathieu Burgaudeau
7	Jonas Vingegaard	Jonas Vingegaard	Christophe Laporte	Victor Campenaerts	Max Poole	INEOS Grenadiers	Victor Campenaerts
8	Giulio Ciccone	Jonas Vingegaard	Christophe Laporte	Giulio Ciccone	Carlos Rodríguez	INEOS Grenadiers	Giulio Ciccone
Final		Jonas Vingegaard	Christophe Laporte	Giulio Ciccone	Carlos Rodríguez	INEOS Grenadiers	Not awarded

== Classification standings ==
Legend
Denotes the winner of the general classification	Denotes the winner of the young rider classification
Denotes the winner of the points classification	Denotes the winner of the team classification
Denotes the winner of the mountains classification	Denotes the winner of the combativity award

=== General classification ===
Final general classification (1–10)
Rank	Rider	Team	Time
1	Jonas Vingegaard (DEN)	Team Jumbo–Visma	29h 28' 39"
2	Adam Yates (GBR)	UAE Team Emirates	+ 2' 23"
3	Ben O'Connor (AUS)	AG2R Citroën Team	+ 2' 56"
4	Jai Hindley (AUS)	Bora–Hansgrohe	+ 3' 16"
5	Jack Haig (AUS)	Team Bahrain Victorious	+ 3' 47"
6	Guillaume Martin (FRA)	Cofidis	+ 4' 51"
7	Louis Meintjes (RSA)	Intermarché–Circus–Wanty	+ 5' 02"
8	Torstein Træen (NOR)	Uno-X Pro Cycling Team	+ 5' 15"
9	Carlos Rodríguez (ESP)	INEOS Grenadiers	+ 5' 19"
10	Julian Alaphilippe (FRA)	Soudal–Quick-Step	+ 5' 37"

=== Points classification ===
Final points classification (1–10)
Rank	Rider	Team	Points
1	Christophe Laporte (FRA)	Team Jumbo–Visma	78
2	Jonas Vingegaard (DEN)	Team Jumbo–Visma	64
3	Matteo Trentin (ITA)	UAE Team Emirates	64
4	Julian Alaphilippe (FRA)	Soudal–Quick-Step	55
5	Adam Yates (GBR)	UAE Team Emirates	40
6	Jai Hindley (AUS)	Bora–Hansgrohe	32
7	Fred Wright (GBR)	Team Bahrain Victorious	30
8	Axel Zingle (FRA)	Cofidis	30
9	Ben O'Connor (AUS)	AG2R Citroën Team	28
10	Clément Champoussin (FRA)	Arkéa–Samsic	24

=== Mountains classification ===
Final mountains classification (1–10)
Rank	Rider	Team	Points
1	Giulio Ciccone (ITA)	Trek–Segafredo	42
2	Victor Campenaerts (BEL)	Lotto–Dstny	40
3	Jonas Vingegaard (DEN)	Team Jumbo–Visma	32
4	Adam Yates (GBR)	UAE Team Emirates	22
5	Julian Alaphilippe (FRA)	Soudal–Quick-Step	21
6	Tiesj Benoot (BEL)	Team Jumbo–Visma	20
7	Jonathan Castroviejo (ESP)	INEOS Grenadiers	14
8	Mathieu Burgaudeau (FRA)	Team TotalEnergies	13
9	Clément Champoussin (FRA)	Arkéa–Samsic	12
10	Mauri Vansevenant (BEL)	Soudal–Quick-Step	12

=== Young rider classification ===
Final young rider classification (1–10)
Rank	Rider	Team	Time
1	Carlos Rodríguez (ESP)	INEOS Grenadiers	29h 33' 58"
2	Max Poole (GBR)	Team DSM	+ 1' 34"
3	Tobias Halland Johannessen (NOR)	Uno-X Pro Cycling Team	+ 2' 41"
4	Lenny Martinez (FRA)	Groupama–FDJ	+ 4' 02"
5	Clément Champoussin (FRA)	Arkéa–Samsic	+ 6' 23"
6	Attila Valter (HUN)	Team Jumbo–Visma	+ 13' 02"
7	Edoardo Zambanini (ITA)	Team Bahrain Victorious	+ 28' 17"
8	Oscar Onley (GBR)	Team DSM	+ 37' 00"
9	Harry Sweeny (AUS)	Lotto–Dstny	+ 49' 49"
10	Mathieu Burgaudeau (FRA)	Team TotalEnergies	+ 53' 04"

=== Team classification ===
Final team classification (1–10)
Rank	Team	Time
1	(United Kingdom) INEOS Grenadiers	88h 40' 45"
2	(United Arab Emirates) UAE Team Emirates	+ 3' 33"
3	Team Bahrain Victorious	+ 9' 54"
4	(Netherlands) Team Jumbo–Visma	+ 18' 31"
5	(Norway) Uno-X Pro Cycling Team	+ 34' 18"
6	(France) Groupama–FDJ	+ 39' 48"
7	(Spain) Movistar Team	+ 47' 13"
8	(France) AG2R Citroën Team	+ 53' 49"
9	(Germany) Bora–Hansgrohe	+ 54' 30"
10	(United States) EF Education–EasyPost	+ 56' 40"
