= Daniel Martínez (cyclist) =

Colombian road racing cyclist (born 1996)

- Martínez in 2026

Personal information
- Full name: Daniel Felipe Martínez Poveda
- Born: 25 April 1996 (age 30) Soacha, Colombia
- Height: 1.72 m (5 ft 8 in)
- Weight: 63 kg (139 lb)

Cycling career
- Sport: Cycling
- Current team: Red Bull–Bora–Hansgrohe
- Discipline: Road
- Role: Rider
- Rider type: All-rounder

Professional teams
- 2015: Colombia
- 2016–2017: Southeast–Venezuela
- 2018–2020: EF Education First–Drapac p/b Cannondale
- 2021–2023: INEOS Grenadiers
- 2024–: Bora–Hansgrohe

Major wins
- Grand Tours Tour de France 1 individual stage (2020) Stage races Critérium du Dauphiné (2020) Tour of the Basque Country (2022) Volta ao Algarve (2023) One-day races and Classics National Time Trial Championships (2019, 2020, 2022, 2024) Coppa Sabatini (2022)
Medal record
Representing Colombia
Men's road cycling
Pan American Games
Gold medal – first place	2019 Lima	Time trial
Pan American Junior Championships
Gold medal – first place	2013 Zacatecas	Time trial
Silver medal – second place	2013 Zacatecas	Road race

Daniel Felipe Martínez Poveda (born 25 April 1996) is a Colombian professional road racing cyclist, who currently rides for UCI WorldTeam Red Bull–Bora–Hansgrohe.

== Career ==
=== Colombia (2015) ===
Martínez abandoned the Volta a Catalunya, his first World Tour race ever. He finished 84th in the Tour of Turkey.

=== Southeast–Venezuela (2016–2017) ===
He rode his first ever Grand Tour in 2016, starting at the Giro d'Italia. He also finished 57th at Il Lombardia. He started in the Giro d'Italia once again in 2017, but abandoned the race. At the end of the season, he finished 4th in the Presidential Tour of Turkey.

=== EF Education First–Drapac (2018–2020) ===
Martínez started the 2018 season at the Colombian National Road Championships, where he finished 2nd in the time trial, behind Egan Bernal. He went on to finish 5th in the new Colombian race, Colombia Oro y Paz. His first top 10 finish in Europe, was at the Volta a Catalunya, where he rode himself to 7th place overall. He rode the Belgian classics for the first time in his career, finishing 44th in La Fléche Wallonne and 61st in Liège–Bastogne–Liège. Then he rode the Tour de Romandie, and finished 12th. In July 2018, he was named in the start list for the Tour de France. In August 2019, he was named in the startlist for the Vuelta a España.

At the start of the 2020 season, and prior to the COVID-19 pandemic-enforced suspension of racing, Martínez won his second consecutive title at the Colombian National Time Trial Championships, and was second to teammate Sergio Higuita in the Tour Colombia, winning the final stage. Martínez won the Critérium du Dauphiné in August, moving from fifth to first on the final day with a second-place stage finish to Sepp Kuss. At the Tour de France, he claimed his first Grand Tour stage win from a breakaway on stage 13, which finished at Puy Mary. He finished the race 28th overall, his best Grand Tour overall placing to that point.

=== Ineos Grenadiers (2021–2023) ===
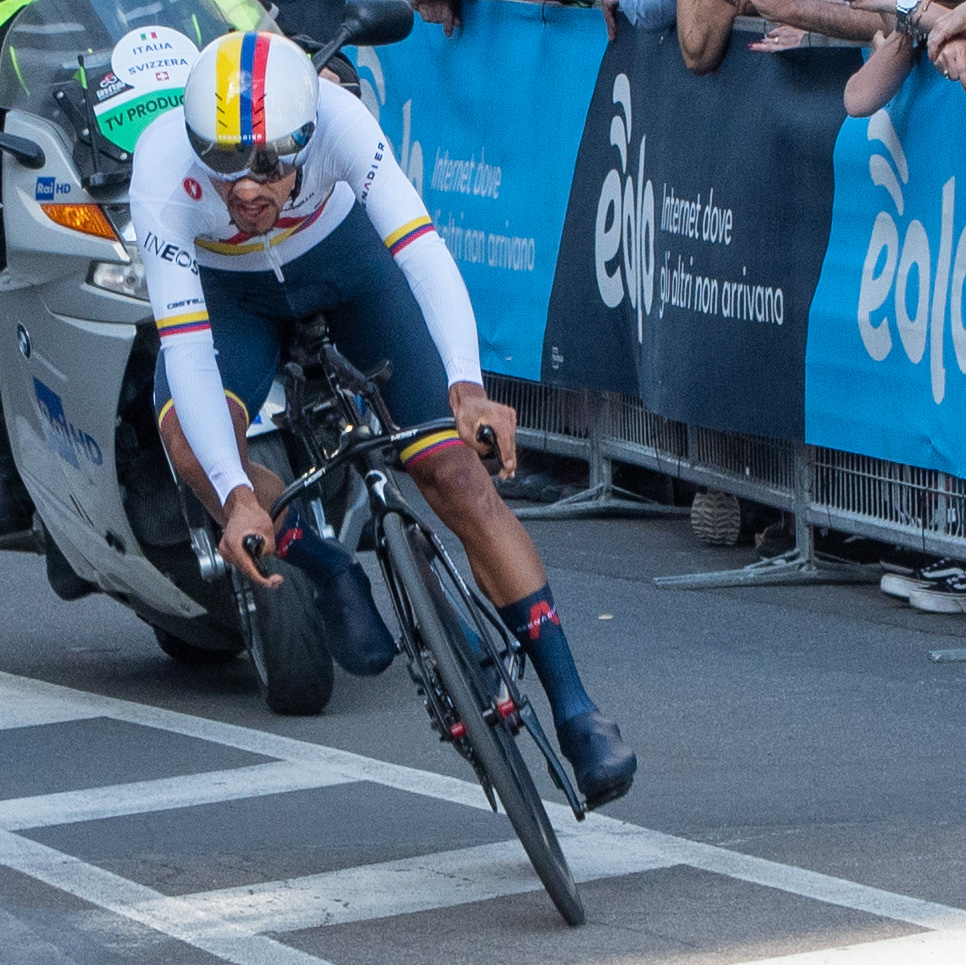
Martinez at the 2021 Giro d'Italia

Martínez joined the INEOS Grenadiers team on an initial one-year contract for the 2021 season. During the Giro d'Italia, Martínez was a mountain domestique for his compatriot of countryman Egan Bernal, who ultimately won the race. Martínez moved his way up the general classification throughout the race, and moved up from seventh to fifth overall on the final weekend; he finished third on the final mountain stage that finished at the Alpe Motta in the Valle Spluga, driving the pace for Bernal while minimising any potential time loss to Damiano Caruso, who won the stage. He finished third in the young rider classification, behind Bernal and Aleksandr Vlasov.

To begin the 2022 season he won a record-equalling third Colombian National Time Trial Championships, and finished in third place overall at both the Volta ao Algarve and Paris–Nice. His next stage race was the Tour of the Basque Country, where he won the fourth stage and ultimately the race overall, after Remco Evenepoel was distanced on the final climb. At both the Tour de Suisse and the Tour de France, Martínez was part of an INEOS Grenadiers team that included Adam Yates, Geraint Thomas and Tom Pidcock. At the latter, Martínez moved into the top-ten overall after the sixth stage, but his general classification hopes were ended after he lost almost half an hour on the two stages either side of the first rest day, which was attributed to illness. He grew stronger by the end of the race and was joined with Wout van Aert and Thibaut Pinot as the final breakaway riders on Hautacam. Eventually Pinot fell back, and the pair rode on alone but ultimately finished behind the GC contenders. Martínez continued riding hard because Geraint Thomas was approaching, who finished 4th on the stage to secure the final podium position.

=== Bora-Hansgrohe (2024–present) ===
At the end of the 2023 season it was announced that Martinez would leave the Ineos Grenadiers to join German pro team Bora–Hansgrohe for an unknown contract duration. Ahead of the start of the 2024 Giro d'Italia, Bora-Hansgrohe announced that Martinez would be their leader in the General classification, selecting him over fellow rider Emanuel Buchmann.

== Major results ==
2013
Pan American Junior Road Championships

1st Time trial
2nd Road race

2014
1st Time trial, National Junior Road Championships
2015
1st Mountains classification, Route du Sud
8th Overall Tour of Utah

1st Young rider classification

2017
4th Overall Tour of Turkey

1st Young rider classification

7th Milano–Torino
9th Tre Valli Varesine
2018
2nd Time trial, National Road Championships
3rd Overall Tour of California
5th Overall Colombia Oro y Paz
6th Overall Colorado Classic

1st Young rider classification

7th Overall Volta a Catalunya
2019 (3 pro wins)
1st Time trial, Pan American Games
1st Time trial, National Road Championships
1st Stage 7 Paris–Nice
2nd Overall Tour of Guangxi
3rd Overall Tour Colombia

1st Stage 1 (TTT)

2020 (4)
National Road Championships

1st Time trial
3rd Road race

1st Overall Critérium du Dauphiné

1st Young rider classification

1st Stage 13 Tour de France
2nd Overall Tour Colombia

1st Stages 1 (TTT) & 6

2021
5th Overall Giro d'Italia
2022 (4)
1st Time trial, National Road Championships
1st Overall Tour of the Basque Country

1st Points classification
1st Stage 4

1st Coppa Sabatini
3rd Overall Paris–Nice
3rd Overall Volta ao Algarve
3rd Giro della Toscana
4th Liège–Bastogne–Liège
5th La Flèche Wallonne
8th Overall Tour de Suisse
2023 (1)
1st Overall Volta ao Algarve
National Road Championships

2nd Road race
5th Time trial

2024 (3)
1st Time trial, National Road Championships
2nd Overall Giro d'Italia
2nd Overall Volta ao Algarve

1st Mountains classification
1st Stages 2 & 5

2025
7th Liège–Bastogne–Liège
2026 (1)
1st Stage 4 CRO Race
2nd Time trial, National Road Championships
2nd Overall Paris–Nice
7th Overall Volta ao Algarve
9th Figueira Champions Classic

=== General classification results timeline ===
Grand Tour general classification results
Grand Tour	2015	2016	2017	2018	2019	2020	2021	2022	2023	2024	2025	2026
Giro d'Italia	—	89	DNF	—	—	—	5	—	—	2	53	—
Tour de France	—	—	—	36	—	28	—	30	DNF	—	—	—
Vuelta a España	—	—	—	—	41	DNF	—	—	—	DNF	—	—
Major stage race general classification results
Major stage race	2015	2016	2017	2018	2019	2020	2021	2022	2023	2024	2025	2026
Paris–Nice	—	—	—	—	18	—	—	3	25	—	—	2
Tirreno–Adriatico	—	—	—	—	—	—	—	—	—	DNF	—	—
Volta a Catalunya	DNF	—	—	7	—	NH	—	—	—	—	—	—
Tour of the Basque Country	—	—	—	—	20	NH	—	1	34	—	—	—
Tour de Romandie	—	—	—	12	25	NH	—	—	—	—	—	40
Critérium du Dauphiné	—	—	—	—	—	1	—	—	23	—	—	DNF
Tour de Suisse	—	—	—	—	—	NH	—	8	—	—	—	—

Legend
—	Did not compete
DNF	Did not finish
NH	Not held
IP	In progress
