= 2020 Giro =

2020 Giro can refer to:

- 2020 Giro Rosa, women's cycling stage race in Italy
- 2020 Giro d'Italia, men's cycling stage race in Italy
- 2020 Giro dell'Emilia, men's cycling one-day race in Italy
