= Pablo Caliero =

Pablo Caliero (born Paul Moulin-Chalier; 20 December 1910 - 13 February 2002 at Clermont-Ferrand) was a French musician and composer.

He came from Brassac-les-Mines (Auvergne, France) and wrote some of the most famous pieces of French Tango music, with international notice and recognized by his Argentine peers. He helped to promote the Salon Tango in the 1950s.

He invented the Fratelli Crosio Bandoneon (Pablo Caliero single note chromatic key system), in Paris in the 1950s. The special feature of this bandoneon was that it was aimed at musicians who could play the chromatic accordion already.

He was also the author of a noted book on method for the chromatic bandoneon, published by Éditions Billaudot.

There are still Pablo Caliero bandoneons in use, but they are no longer in production. The end of the line came towards the end of the 1980s.
