= 2020 Mont Ventoux Dénivelé Challenge =

2020 UCI Europe Tour
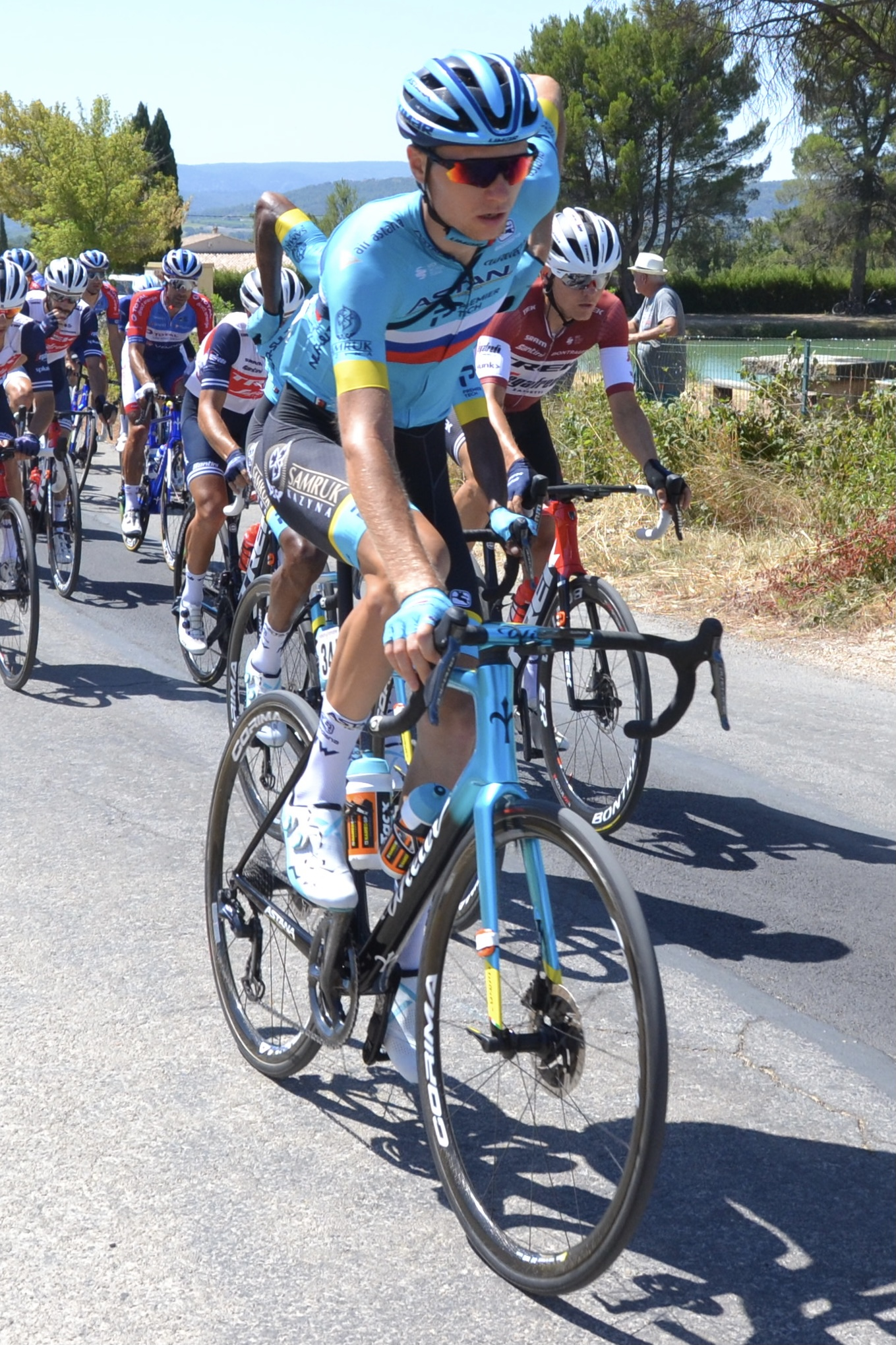
- Winner Alaksandr Vlasov before the climb.

Race details
- Dates: 6 August 2020
- Stages: 1
- Distance: 179 km (111 mi)
- Winning time: 4h 56' 39"

Results
	Winner	Aleksandr Vlasov (RUS)	(Astana)
	Second	Richie Porte (AUS)	(Trek–Segafredo)
	Third	Guillaume Martin (FRA)	(Cofidis)

The 2020 Mont Ventoux Dénivelé Challenge was the second edition of the Mont Ventoux Dénivelé Challenge road cycling one day race. It was held on 6 August as a category 1.1 event on the 2020 UCI Europe Tour.

The race, which started in Vaison-la-Romaine and finished at the summit of Mont Ventoux, was won by Aleksandr Vlasov of Astana, while defending champion Jesús Herrada of Cofidis finished in ninth.

== Teams ==
Eighteen teams participated in the race, which consisted of six UCI WorldTeams, nine UCI ProTeams, and three UCI Continental Teams. Each team entered seven riders except for AG2R La Mondiale and Cambodia Cycling Academy, which each entered six, meaning the race began with a peloton of 124 riders. Of these riders, 70 finished, while a further 4 riders finished over the time limit.

UCI WorldTeams

- AG2R La Mondiale
- Astana
- Cofidis
- Groupama–FDJ
- Trek–Segafredo
- UAE Team Emirates

UCI ProTeams

- Arkéa–Samsic
- B&B Hotels–Vital Concept
- Bardiani–CSF–Faizanè
- Burgos BH
- Caja Rural–Seguros RGA
- Circus–Wanty Gobert
- Euskaltel–Euskadi
- Nippo–Delko–One Provence
- Total Direct Énergie

UCI Continental Teams

- Cambodia Cycling Academy
- Canyon dhb p/b Soreen
- Equipo Kern Pharma

== Results ==
Result
Rank	Rider	Team	Time
1	Aleksandr Vlasov (RUS)	Astana	4h 56' 39"
2	Richie Porte (AUS)	Trek–Segafredo	+ 18"
3	Guillaume Martin (FRA)	Cofidis	+ 59"
4	Pierre Latour (FRA)	AG2R La Mondiale	+ 1' 29"
5	Fabio Aru (ITA)	UAE Team Emirates	+ 1' 38"
6	Harold Tejada (COL)	Astana	+ 1' 43"
7	Kenny Elissonde (FRA)	Trek–Segafredo	+ 1' 51"
8	Nairo Quintana (COL)	Arkéa–Samsic	+ 1' 57"
9	Jesús Herrada (ESP)	Cofidis	+ 2' 15"
10	Valentin Madouas (FRA)	Groupama–FDJ	+ 2' 32"
