= Guillaume Martin =

French cyclist

Guillaume Martin-Guyonnet
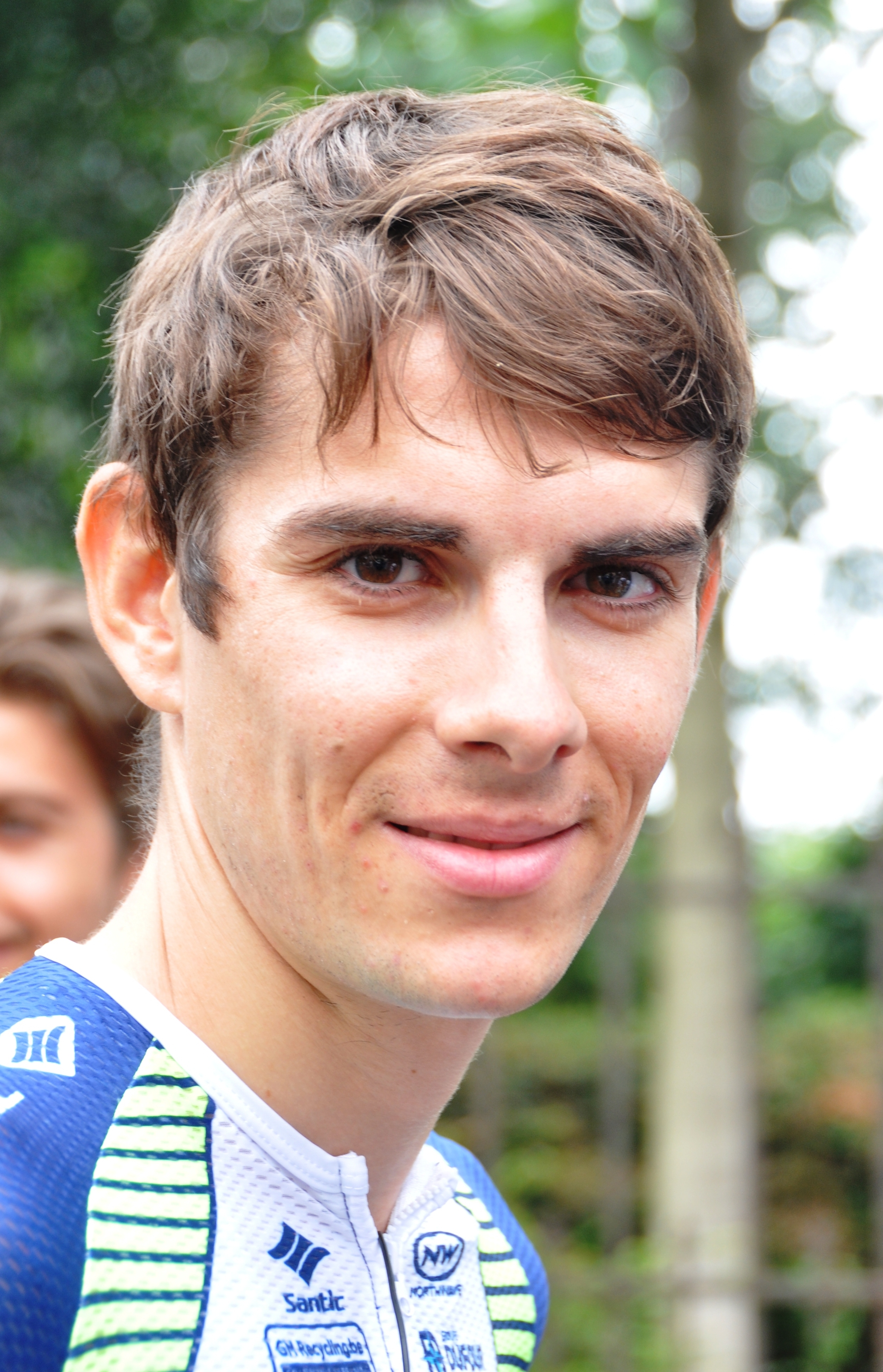
- Martin at the 2018 Deutschland Tour

Personal information
- Full name: Guillaume Martin-Guyonnet
- Born: 9 June 1993 (age 33) Paris, France
- Height: 1.73 m (5 ft 8 in)
- Weight: 55 kg (121 lb)

Cycling career
- Sport: Cycling
- Current team: Groupama–FDJ United
- Discipline: Road
- Role: Rider
- Rider type: Climber

Amateur teams
- 2011: VC Saint-Hilaire-du-Harcouët
- 2012–2013: Sojasun–ACNC
- 2014–2015: CC Étupes

Professional teams
- 2013: Sojasun (stagiaire)
- 2014: FDJ.fr (stagiaire)
- 2016–2019: Wanty–Groupe Gobert
- 2020–2024: Cofidis
- 2025–: Groupama–FDJ

Major wins
- Grand Tours Vuelta a España Mountains classification (2020)

Guillaume Martin-Guyonnet (born 9 June 1993) is a French cyclist who currently rides for UCI WorldTeam Groupama–FDJ United.

== Career ==
In June 2017, he was named in the startlist for the Tour de France. While not necessarily considered a pre-race favourite for overall victory in the general classification, Martin finished just outside the top 20 in 2017 and 2018 and just outside the top 10 in 2019. In 2021 he placed 8th in the Tour and 9th in La Vuelta a España.

=== Cofidis (2020–present) ===
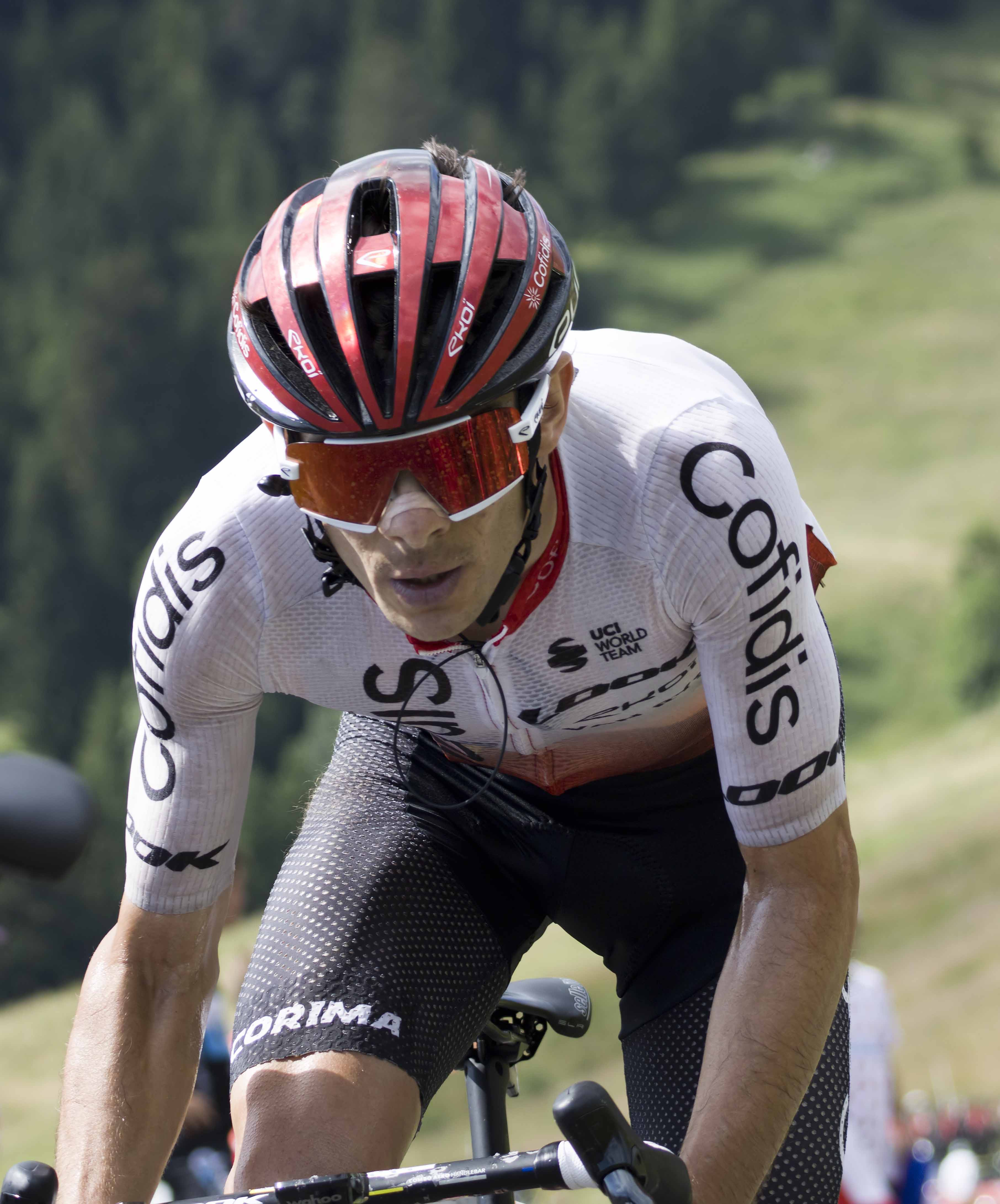
Martin at the 2023 Tour de France

Having ridden for Wanty–Groupe Gobert since the start of the 2016 season, Martin joined Cofidis ahead of the 2020 season. In August, Martin finished third overall at the Critérium du Dauphiné. He then rode in the Tour de France, in which he held third place overall from stages seven to twelve, before ultimately finishing eleventh overall. In October, he was named in the startlist for the Vuelta a España. Having lost over ten minutes across the first three stages, Martin formed part of the breakaway on three consecutive stages, taking the mountains classification lead following stage seven – a lead he did not relinquish for the remainder of the race.

Martin contested his fifth consecutive Tour de France in 2021; after spending the first week outside the top 25 places overall, Martin moved into the top ten following stage nine, after being part of the day's breakaway. On the fourteenth stage, Martin moved up to second place overall – behind Tadej Pogačar – having been part of a seven-rider move that attacked around halfway through the stage, and gained five minutes on the peloton. He ceded almost four minutes the following day, on the first Pyrenean stage, dropping back to ninth overall; he ultimately finished the race in eighth place. Contesting the Vuelta a España for the second straight year, Martin was part of a 31-rider breakaway on the tenth stage – he had entered the stage almost ten minutes down on race leader Primož Roglič – which ultimately splintered on the day's categorised climb, the Puerto de Almáchar. Martin finished in the second chase group, moving up to second overall behind the new race leader, Odd Christian Eiking. In the final week, Martin lost more than four minutes to Roglič on consecutive stages – as he regained the race lead – and as a result, Martin dropped to an eventual finish of ninth place in the general classification.

Martin started the 2022 season with a block of racing in France, taking a third-place overall finish at the Tour des Alpes-Maritimes et du Var, his first such stage race finish since the 2020 Critérium du Dauphiné. The following weekend, Martin finished fifth at the Faun-Ardèche Classic and second at La Drôme Classic, finishing three seconds behind winner Jonas Vingegaard in the latter. At Paris–Nice, Martin gradually made his way up the general classification, moving up to a ninth-place overall finish on the final weekend of the race.

== Personal life ==
Born in Paris, Martin grew up in, Sainte-Honorine-la-Chardonne part of Norman Switzerland. His father was a teacher of aikido, which Guillaume practiced during his childhood, and his mother was a drama teacher. He holds a master's degree in philosophy from Paris Nanterre University and is the author of three books, one of which is Socrates By Bike.

In 2024 Martin added Guyonnet, the surname of his mother, to his own surname as a symbolic rejection of patriarchal naming conventions.

== Major results ==
2011
10th Road race, UEC European Junior Road Championships
2012
9th Overall Ronde de l'Isard
2014
4th Overall Tour Alsace
2015
1st Liège–Bastogne–Liège Espoirs
4th Overall Ronde de l'Isard
10th Overall Tour de l'Avenir

1st Stage 5

2016
2nd Overall Tour of Austria
4th Overall Tour de l'Ain
8th Overall Rhône-Alpes Isère Tour
2017 (3 pro wins)
1st Overall Giro della Toscana

1st Stage 2

1st Overall Tour du Gévaudan Languedoc-Roussillon

1st Stage 1

1st Stage 4 Tour du Limousin
3rd Overall Tour du Jura
6th Polynormande
7th Coppa Sabatini
10th Tour du Doubs
2018 (2)
1st Overall Circuit de la Sarthe

1st Stage 3

3rd Tour du Finistère
3rd Boucles de l'Aulne
4th Tour du Doubs
5th Road race, National Road Championships
5th Grand Prix de Wallonie
5th Grand Prix La Marseillaise
9th Overall Deutschland Tour
2019 (1)
2nd Overall Giro di Sicilia

1st Stage 4

2nd Trofeo Campos, Porreres, Felanitx, Ses Salines
3rd Overall Tour du Limousin
3rd Memorial Marco Pantani
3rd Tour du Doubs
5th Overall Vuelta a Burgos
5th Tour du Finistère
6th Gran Premio Bruno Beghelli
6th Grand Prix de Plumelec-Morbihan
7th Trofeo Andratx–Lloseta
7th Trofeo Serra de Tramuntana
8th Overall Volta a Catalunya
8th Ardèche Classic
8th La Drôme Classic
2020
Vuelta a España

1st Mountains classification
Combativity award Stages 5, 12 & 15

3rd Overall Critérium du Dauphiné
3rd Ardèche Classic
3rd Mont Ventoux Dénivelé Challenge
4th La Drôme Classic
7th Overall Vuelta a San Juan

1st Mountains classification

8th Overall Tour de l'Ain
2021 (1)
1st Mercan'Tour Classic Alpes-Maritimes
6th Overall Paris–Nice
8th Overall Tour de France
8th Veneto Classic
9th Overall Vuelta a España
2022 (2)
1st Overall Tour de l'Ain

1st Stage 2

2nd La Drôme Classic
3rd Overall Tour des Alpes-Maritimes et du Var
3rd Coppa Sabatini
4th Polynormande
5th Ardèche Classic
5th Mont Ventoux Dénivelé Challenge
6th Coppa Agostoni
6th Japan Cup
8th Overall Volta a Catalunya
8th Overall Tour du Limousin
9th Overall Paris–Nice
9th Giro della Toscana
10th Overall Tour de Wallonie
2023
3rd Japan Cup
3rd Tour du Jura
4th Coppa Sabatini
4th Classic Grand Besançon Doubs
4th Tour du Doubs
5th Paris–Camembert
6th Overall Critérium du Dauphiné
6th Liège–Bastogne–Liège
6th Memorial Marco Pantani
7th Overall Arctic Race of Norway
7th Mercan'Tour Classic
8th Ardèche Classic
10th Overall Tour de France
2024
3rd Tour du Jura
5th Tour du Doubs
6th Mercan'Tour Classic
6th Paris–Camembert
8th Overall Tour des Alpes-Maritimes
10th La Flèche Wallonne
2025 (2)
1st Classic Grand Besançon Doubs
1st Tour du Jura
6th Overall Tour des Alpes-Maritimes
6th Tour du Doubs
10th Overall Critérium du Dauphiné
10th Classic Var
2026
6th Tour du Jura
10th Overall Tour Auvergne-Rhône-Alpes

=== General classification results timeline ===
Grand Tour general classification results
Grand Tour	2016	2017	2018	2019	2020	2021	2022	2023	2024	2025	2026
Giro d'Italia	—	—	—	—	—	—	14	—	—	—	—
Tour de France	—	23	21	12	11	8	DNF	10	13	16	31
Vuelta a España	—	—	—	—	14	9	—	—	15	DNF	
Major stage race general classification results
Race	2016	2017	2018	2019	2020	2021	2022	2023	2024	2025	2026
Paris–Nice	—	—	—	—	12	6	9	—	—	13	—
Tirreno–Adriatico	—	—	—	—	—	—	—	21	23	—	—
Volta a Catalunya	—	46	—	8	NH	—	8	27	26	—	31
Tour of the Basque Country	—	—	—	—	NH	31	—	—	—	12	11
Tour de Romandie	42	44	27	18	NH	—	—	—	17	—	—
Critérium du Dauphiné	29	18	12	17	3	20	—	6	19	10	10
Tour de Suisse	—	—	—	—	NH	—	—	—	—	—	—

Legend
—	Did not compete
DNF	Did not finish
IP	In progress
NH	Not held
