= Cycling at the 2026 Asian Games – Men's individual time trial =

Men's individual time trial at the 2026 Asian Games
- Venue: Shinshiro Cycling Road Course
- Date: 20 September 2026
- Competitors: 18 from 18 nations

Medalists
gold medal	Alexey Lutsenko	Kazakhstan
silver medal	Shunsuke Imamura	Japan
bronze medal	Sainbayaryn Jambaljamts	Mongolia

The men's 32.1 kilometres road time trial competition at the 2026 Asian Games took place on 20 September 2026 in Shinshiro Cycling Road Course.

== Schedule ==
All times are Japan Standard Time (UTC+09:00)

Date	Time	Event
Sunday, 20 September 2026	13:30	Final

== Results ==
Rank	Athlete	Time
1st place, gold medalist(s)	Alexey Lutsenko (KAZ)	41:24.05
2nd place, silver medalist(s)	Shunsuke Imamura (JPN)	42:58.04
3rd place, bronze medalist(s)	Sainbayaryn Jambaljamts (MGL)	42:58.06
4	Xue Ming (CHN)	43:21.44
5	Sergio Tu (TPE)	43:38.95
6	Athit Poulard (THA)	43:55.98
7	Abdulla Jasim Al-Ali (UAE)	44:01.48
8	Seyed Mirbagheri (IRI)	44:09.38
9	Vincent Lau (HKG)	44:17.36
10	Min Kyeong-ho (KOR)	44:26.77
11	Kam Chin Pok (MAC)	45:25.36
12	Phạm Lê Xuân Lộc (VIE)	45:33.19
13	Naser Ahmed (BHR)	46:58.46
14	Nikita Tsvetkov (UZB)	47:17.54
15	Maulana Al Hayat (INA)	47:22.09
16	Sahadat Hosain (BAN)	57:42.63
	Younes Ali (QAT)	DNS
	Ibrahiem Alrefai (SYR)	DNS
