= 2022 Coppa Sabatini =

- 2022 UCI ProSeries

Race details
- Dates: 15 September 2022
- Stages: 1
- Distance: 198.93 km (123.6 mi)
- Winning time: 4h 55' 37"

Results
	Winner	Daniel Martínez (COL)	(Ineos Grenadiers)
	Second	Odd Christian Eiking (NOR)	(EF Education–EasyPost)
	Third	Guillaume Martin (FRA)	(Cofidis)

The 2022 Coppa Sabatini (also known as the Gran Premio città di Peccioli) was the 70th edition of the Coppa Sabatini road cycling one day race, which was held on 15 September 2022 as part of the 2022 UCI ProSeries calendar.

== Teams ==
Ten of the 19 UCI WorldTeams, four UCI ProTeams, five UCI Continental teams made up the nineteen teams that participated in the race. Astana Qazaqstan Team, Cofidis, Israel–Premier Tech, Movistar Team and Team Corratec were the only four teams not to enter a full squad of seven riders. Only 46 riders finished the race.

UCI WorldTeams

- Astana Qazaqstan Team
- Bora–Hansgrohe
- Cofidis
- EF Education–EasyPost
- Ineos Grenadiers
- Intermarché–Wanty–Gobert Matériaux
- Israel–Premier Tech
- Lotto–Soudal
- Movistar Team
- UAE Team Emirates

UCI ProTeams

- Bardiani–CSF–Faizanè
- Drone Hopper–Androni Giocattoli
- Eolo–Kometa
- Team TotalEnergies

UCI Continental Teams

- Beltrami TSA–Tre Colli
- Giotti Victoria–Savini Due
- MG.K vis Colors for Peace VPM
- Team Corratec
- Work Service–Vitalcare–Vega

== Result ==
Result
Rank	Rider	Team	Time
1	Daniel Martínez (COL)	Ineos Grenadiers	4h 55' 37"
2	Odd Christian Eiking (NOR)	EF Education–EasyPost	+ 0"
3	Guillaume Martin (FRA)	Cofidis	+ 0"
4	Esteban Chaves (COL)	EF Education–EasyPost	+ 0"
5	Aleksandr Vlasov	Bora–Hansgrohe	+ 0"
6	Vincenzo Albanese (ITA)	Eolo–Kometa	+ 59"
7	Simone Velasco (ITA)	Astana Qazaqstan Team	+ 59"
8	Andreas Kron (DEN)	Lotto–Soudal	+ 59"
9	Marc Hirschi (SUI)	UAE Team Emirates	+ 59"
10	Andrea Piccolo (ITA)	EF Education–EasyPost	+ 59"
