= 2020 Critérium du Dauphiné =

2020 UCI World Tour, race 9 of 21

Race details
- Dates: 12–16 August 2020
- Stages: 5
- Distance: 817.5 km (508.0 mi)
- Winning time: 21h 44' 58"

Results
Jersey awarded to the overall winner	Winner	Daniel Martínez (COL)	(EF Pro Cycling)
	Second	Thibaut Pinot (FRA)	(Groupama–FDJ)
	Third	Guillaume Martin (FRA)	(Cofidis)
Jersey awarded to the points classification winner	Points	Wout van Aert (BEL)	(Team Jumbo–Visma)
Jersey awarded to the mountains classification winner	Mountains	David de la Cruz (ESP)	(UAE Team Emirates)
Jersey awarded to the young rider classification winner	Young rider	Daniel Martínez (COL)	(EF Pro Cycling)
Jersey awarded to the team classification winner	Team	Team Jumbo–Visma	

The 2020 Critérium du Dauphiné was the 72nd edition of the Critérium du Dauphiné, a road cycling stage race. The race took place between 12 and 16 August 2020 in France, having originally been scheduled for 31 May to 7 June, and then postponed due to the COVID-19 pandemic in France. On 24 February 2020, the race organisers, the Amaury Sport Organisation (ASO), announced the route at a presentation in Lyon.

== Teams ==
All 19 UCI WorldTeams and four wildcard UCI ProTeams make up the twenty-two teams of seven riders each that participated in the race. Of the 161 riders that started the race, only 106 finished.

UCI WorldTeams

- AG2R La Mondiale
- Astana
- Bahrain–McLaren
- Bora–Hansgrohe
- CCC Team
- Cofidis
- Deceuninck–Quick-Step
- EF Pro Cycling
- Groupama–FDJ
- Israel Start-Up Nation
- Lotto–Soudal
- Mitchelton–Scott
- Movistar Team
- NTT Pro Cycling
- Team INEOS
- Team Jumbo–Visma
- Team Sunweb
- Trek–Segafredo
- UAE Team Emirates

UCI ProTeams

- Arkéa–Samsic
- B&B Hotels–Vital Concept
- Circus–Wanty Gobert
- Total Direct Énergie

== Route ==
Stage characteristics and winners (Note: The route was originally scheduled to total eight stages.)
Stage	Date	Course	Distance	Type	Winner
1	12 August	Clermont-Ferrand to Saint-Christo-en-Jarez	218.5 km (135.8 mi)	Hilly stage	Wout van Aert (BEL)
2	13 August	Vienne to Col de Porte	135 km (84 mi)	Hilly stage	Primož Roglič (SLO)
3	14 August	Corenc to Saint-Martin-de-Belleville	157 km (98 mi)	Mountain stage	Davide Formolo (ITA)
4	15 August	Ugine to Megève	153.5 km (95.4 mi)	Mountain stage	Lennard Kämna (GER)
5	16 August	Megève to Megève	153.5 km (95.4 mi)	Mountain stage	Sepp Kuss (USA)
Total		817.5 km (508.0 mi)			

== Stages ==
=== Stage 1 ===
12 August 2020 — Clermont-Ferrand to Saint-Christo-en-Jarez, 218.5 km (135.8 mi)

Stage 1 Result
Rank	Rider	Team	Time
1	Wout van Aert (BEL)	Team Jumbo–Visma	5h 27' 42"
2	Daryl Impey (RSA)	Mitchelton–Scott	+ 0"
3	Egan Bernal (COL)	Team INEOS	+ 0"
4	Alejandro Valverde (ESP)	Movistar Team	+ 0"
5	Tadej Pogačar (SLO)	UAE Team Emirates	+ 0"
6	Alexey Lutsenko (KAZ)	Astana	+ 0"
7	Sergio Higuita (COL)	EF Pro Cycling	+ 0"
8	Benoît Cosnefroy (FRA)	AG2R La Mondiale	+ 0"
9	Primož Roglič (SLO)	Team Jumbo–Visma	+ 0"
10	Guillaume Martin (FRA)	Cofidis	+ 0"

General classification after Stage 1
Rank	Rider	Team	Time
1	Wout van Aert (BEL)	Team Jumbo–Visma	5h 27' 32"
2	Daryl Impey (RSA)	Mitchelton–Scott	+ 4"
3	Egan Bernal (COL)	Team INEOS	+ 6"
4	Alejandro Valverde (ESP)	Movistar Team	+ 10"
5	Tadej Pogačar (SLO)	UAE Team Emirates	+ 10"
6	Alexey Lutsenko (KAZ)	Astana	+ 10"
7	Sergio Higuita (COL)	EF Pro Cycling	+ 10"
8	Benoît Cosnefroy (FRA)	AG2R La Mondiale	+ 10"
9	Primož Roglič (SLO)	Team Jumbo–Visma	+ 10"
10	Guillaume Martin (FRA)	Cofidis	+ 10"

=== Stage 2 ===
13 August 2020 — Vienne to Col de Porte, 135 km (84 mi)

Stage 2 Result
Rank	Rider	Team	Time
1	Primož Roglič (SLO)	Team Jumbo–Visma	3h 39' 40"
2	Thibaut Pinot (FRA)	Groupama–FDJ	+ 8"
3	Emanuel Buchmann (GER)	Bora–Hansgrohe	+ 8"
4	Guillaume Martin (FRA)	Cofidis	+ 8"
5	Nairo Quintana (COL)	Arkéa–Samsic	+ 10"
6	Miguel Ángel López (COL)	Astana	+ 10"
7	Daniel Martínez (COL)	EF Pro Cycling	+ 10"
8	Mikel Landa (ESP)	Bahrain–McLaren	+ 10"
9	Richie Porte (AUS)	Trek–Segafredo	+ 10"
10	Egan Bernal (COL)	Team INEOS	+ 10"

General classification after Stage 2
Rank	Rider	Team	Time
1	Primož Roglič (SLO)	Team Jumbo–Visma	9h 07' 12"
2	Thibaut Pinot (FRA)	Groupama–FDJ	+ 12"
3	Emanuel Buchmann (GER)	Bora–Hansgrohe	+ 14"
4	Egan Bernal (COL)	Team INEOS	+ 16"
5	Guillaume Martin (FRA)	Cofidis	+ 18"
6	Nairo Quintana (COL)	Arkéa–Samsic	+ 20"
7	Richie Porte (AUS)	Trek–Segafredo	+ 20"
8	Mikel Landa (ESP)	Bahrain–McLaren	+ 20"
9	Miguel Ángel López (COL)	Astana	+ 20"
10	Daniel Martínez (COL)	EF Pro Cycling	+ 20"

=== Stage 3 ===
14 August 2020 — Corenc to Saint-Martin-de-Belleville, 157 km (98 mi)

Stage 3 Result
Rank	Rider	Team	Time
1	Davide Formolo (ITA)	UAE Team Emirates	4h 06' 56"
2	Primož Roglič (SLO)	Team Jumbo–Visma	+ 33"
3	Thibaut Pinot (FRA)	Groupama–FDJ	+ 33"
4	Emanuel Buchmann (GER)	Bora–Hansgrohe	+ 33"
5	Daniel Martínez (COL)	EF Pro Cycling	+ 33"
6	Mikel Landa (ESP)	Bahrain–McLaren	+ 33"
7	Guillaume Martin (FRA)	Cofidis	+ 33"
8	Tadej Pogačar (SLO)	UAE Team Emirates	+ 33"
9	Pavel Sivakov (RUS)	Team INEOS	+ 39"
10	Miguel Ángel López (COL)	Astana	+ 39"

General classification after Stage 3
Rank	Rider	Team	Time
1	Primož Roglič (SLO)	Team Jumbo–Visma	13h 14' 35"
2	Thibaut Pinot (FRA)	Groupama–FDJ	+ 14"
3	Emanuel Buchmann (GER)	Bora–Hansgrohe	+ 20"
4	Guillaume Martin (FRA)	Cofidis	+ 24"
5	Mikel Landa (ESP)	Bahrain–McLaren	+ 26"
6	Daniel Martínez (COL)	EF Pro Cycling	+ 26"
7	Egan Bernal (COL)	Team INEOS	+ 31"
8	Miguel Ángel López (COL)	Astana	+ 32"
9	Nairo Quintana (COL)	Arkéa–Samsic	+ 35"
10	Richie Porte (AUS)	Trek–Segafredo	+ 35"

=== Stage 4 ===
15 August 2020 — Ugine to Megève, 153.5 km (95.4 mi)

Stage 4 Result
Rank	Rider	Team	Time
1	Lennard Kämna (GER)	Bora–Hansgrohe	4h 27' 56"
2	David de la Cruz (ESP)	UAE Team Emirates	+ 41"
3	Julian Alaphilippe (FRA)	Deceuninck–Quick-Step	+ 56"
4	Jack Haig (AUS)	Mitchelton–Scott	+ 58"
5	Kenny Elissonde (FRA)	Trek–Segafredo	+ 1' 02"
6	Fausto Masnada (ITA)	CCC Team	+ 1' 10"
7	Michał Kwiatkowski (POL)	Team INEOS	+ 1' 19"
8	Marc Hirschi (SUI)	Team Sunweb	+ 1' 43"
9	Thibaut Pinot (FRA)	Groupama–FDJ	+ 3' 01"
10	Primož Roglič (SLO)	Team Jumbo–Visma	+ 3' 01"

General classification after Stage 4
Rank	Rider	Team	Time
1	Primož Roglič (SLO)	Team Jumbo–Visma	17h 45' 32"
2	Thibaut Pinot (FRA)	Groupama–FDJ	+ 14"
3	Guillaume Martin (FRA)	Cofidis	+ 24"
4	Mikel Landa (ESP)	Bahrain–McLaren	+ 26"
5	Daniel Martínez (COL)	EF Pro Cycling	+ 26"
6	Miguel Ángel López (COL)	Astana	+ 32"
7	Nairo Quintana (COL)	Arkéa–Samsic	+ 35"
8	Richie Porte (AUS)	Trek–Segafredo	+ 35"
9	Tadej Pogačar (SLO)	UAE Team Emirates	+ 1' 17"
10	Romain Bardet (FRA)	AG2R La Mondiale	+ 1' 24"

=== Stage 5 ===
16 August 2020 — Megève to Megève, 153.5 km (95.4 mi)

Before the stage, Primož Roglič, who was leading the general and points classifications, abandoned the race due to the injuries he sustained from a crash the day before.

Stage 5 Result
Rank	Rider	Team	Time
1	Sepp Kuss (USA)	Team Jumbo–Visma	3h 58' 39"
2	Daniel Martínez (COL)	EF Pro Cycling	+ 27"
3	Tadej Pogačar (SLO)	UAE Team Emirates	+ 30"
4	Pavel Sivakov (RUS)	Team INEOS	+ 45"
5	Tom Dumoulin (NED)	Team Jumbo–Visma	+ 51"
6	Lennard Kämna (GER)	Bora–Hansgrohe	+ 51"
7	Thibaut Pinot (FRA)	Groupama–FDJ	+ 1' 02"
8	Guillaume Martin (FRA)	Cofidis	+ 1' 04"
9	Romain Bardet (FRA)	AG2R La Mondiale	+ 1' 06"
10	Warren Barguil (FRA)	Arkéa–Samsic	+ 1' 06"

General classification after Stage 5
Rank	Rider	Team	Time
1	Daniel Martínez (COL)	EF Pro Cycling	21h 44' 58"
2	Thibaut Pinot (FRA)	Groupama–FDJ	+ 29"
3	Guillaume Martin (FRA)	Cofidis	+ 41"
4	Tadej Pogačar (SLO)	UAE Team Emirates	+ 56"
5	Miguel Ángel López (COL)	Astana	+ 1' 38"
6	Romain Bardet (FRA)	AG2R La Mondiale	+ 1' 43"
7	Tom Dumoulin (NED)	Team Jumbo–Visma	+ 2' 07"
8	Lennard Kämna (GER)	Bora–Hansgrohe	+ 2' 14"
9	Warren Barguil (FRA)	Arkéa–Samsic	+ 2' 49"
10	Sepp Kuss (USA)	Team Jumbo–Visma	+ 2' 55"

== Classification leadership table ==
Classification leadership by stage
Stage	Winner	General classification	Points classification	Mountains classification	Young rider classification	Team classification
1	Wout van Aert	Wout van Aert	Wout van Aert	Michael Schär	Egan Bernal	Team Jumbo–Visma
2	Primož Roglič	Primož Roglič	Wout van Aert	Michael Schär	Egan Bernal	Team Jumbo–Visma
3	Davide Formolo	Primož Roglič	Primož Roglič	Davide Formolo	Daniel Martínez	Team Jumbo–Visma
4	Lennard Kämna	Primož Roglič	Primož Roglič	David de la Cruz	Daniel Martínez	Team Jumbo–Visma
5	Sepp Kuss	Daniel Martínez	Wout van Aert	David de la Cruz	Daniel Martínez	Team Jumbo–Visma
Final		Daniel Martínez	Wout van Aert	David de la Cruz	Daniel Martínez	Team Jumbo–Visma

- On stage two, Daryl Impey, who was second in the points classification, wore the green jersey, because first placed Wout van Aert wore the yellow jersey as the leader of the general classification.
- On stage four, Wout van Aert, who was second in the points classification, wore the green jersey, because first placed Primož Roglič wore the yellow jersey as the leader of the general classification. On stage five, van Aert wore the green jersey again because Roglič, who led the classification, did not start the stage due to injuries.
- On stage five, no rider wore the yellow jersey, since first placed Primož Roglič did not start the stage due to injuries.

== Classification standings ==
Legend
General classification	Denotes the winner of the general classification	Denotes the winner of the points classification
	Denotes the winner of the mountains classification	Denotes the winner of the young rider classification
	Denotes the winner of the team classification	

=== General classification ===
Final general classification (1–10)
Rank	Rider	Team	Time
1	Daniel Martínez (COL)	EF Pro Cycling	21h 44' 58"
2	Thibaut Pinot (FRA)	Groupama–FDJ	+ 29"
3	Guillaume Martin (FRA)	Cofidis	+ 41"
4	Tadej Pogačar (SLO)	UAE Team Emirates	+ 56"
5	Miguel Ángel López (COL)	Astana	+ 1' 38"
6	Romain Bardet (FRA)	AG2R La Mondiale	+ 1' 43"
7	Tom Dumoulin (NED)	Team Jumbo–Visma	+ 2' 07"
8	Lennard Kämna (GER)	Bora–Hansgrohe	+ 2' 14"
9	Warren Barguil (FRA)	Arkéa–Samsic	+ 2' 49"
10	Sepp Kuss (USA)	Team Jumbo–Visma	+ 2' 55"

=== Points classification ===
Final points classification (1–10)
Rank	Rider	Team	Points
1	Wout van Aert (BEL)	Team Jumbo–Visma	29
2	Tadej Pogačar (SLO)	UAE Team Emirates	29
3	Thibaut Pinot (FRA)	Groupama–FDJ	28
4	Daniel Martínez (COL)	EF Pro Cycling	22
5	Daryl Impey (RSA)	Mitchelton–Scott	22
6	Guillaume Martin (FRA)	Cofidis	21
7	Lennard Kämna (GER)	Bora–Hansgrohe	20
8	Pavel Sivakov (RUS)	Team INEOS	20
9	Davide Formolo (ITA)	UAE Team Emirates	19
10	Alejandro Valverde (ESP)	Movistar Team	18

=== Mountains classification ===
Final mountains classification (1–10)
Rank	Rider	Team	Points
1	David de la Cruz (ESP)	UAE Team Emirates	68
2	Julian Alaphilippe (FRA)	Deceuninck–Quick-Step	52
3	Fausto Masnada (ITA)	CCC Team	28
4	Pavel Sivakov (RUS)	Team INEOS	26
5	Thibaut Pinot (FRA)	Groupama–FDJ	26
6	Davide Formolo (ITA)	UAE Team Emirates	25
7	Sepp Kuss (USA)	Team Jumbo–Visma	19
8	Michael Schär (SUI)	CCC Team	16
9	Tadej Pogačar (SLO)	UAE Team Emirates	15
10	Lennard Kämna (GER)	Bora–Hansgrohe	12

=== Young rider classification ===
Final young rider classification (1–10)
Rank	Rider	Team	Time
1	Daniel Martínez (COL)	EF Pro Cycling	21h 44' 58"
2	Tadej Pogačar (SLO)	UAE Team Emirates	+ 56"
3	Lennard Kämna (GER)	Bora–Hansgrohe	+ 2' 14"
4	Pavel Sivakov (RUS)	Team INEOS	+ 3' 10"
5	Enric Mas (ESP)	Movistar Team	+ 22' 33"
6	Valentin Madouas (FRA)	Groupama–FDJ	+ 26' 51"
7	Marc Hirschi (SUI)	Team Sunweb	+ 31' 15"
8	Harm Vanhoucke (BEL)	Lotto–Soudal	+ 1h 04' 54"
9	Niklas Eg (DEN)	Trek–Segafredo	+ 1h 05' 18"
10	Will Barta (USA)	CCC Team	+ 1h 06' 36"

=== Teams classification ===
Final teams classification (1–10)
Rank	Team	Time
1	(Netherlands) Team Jumbo–Visma	65h 32' 37"
2	(France) Groupama–FDJ	+ 18' 51"
3	(United Kingdom) Team INEOS	+ 21' 55"
4	(Spain) Movistar Team	+ 40' 36"
5	(United Arab Emirates) UAE Team Emirates	+ 47' 49"
6	(United States) EF Pro Cycling	+ 49' 57"
7	(United States) Trek–Segafredo	+ 55' 43"
8	Bahrain–McLaren	+ 1h 02' 53"
9	(France) Cofidis	+ 1h 08' 00"
10	(Kazakhstan) Astana	+ 1h 11' 40"
