= Alexey Lutsenko =

Kazakhstani cyclist (born 1992)

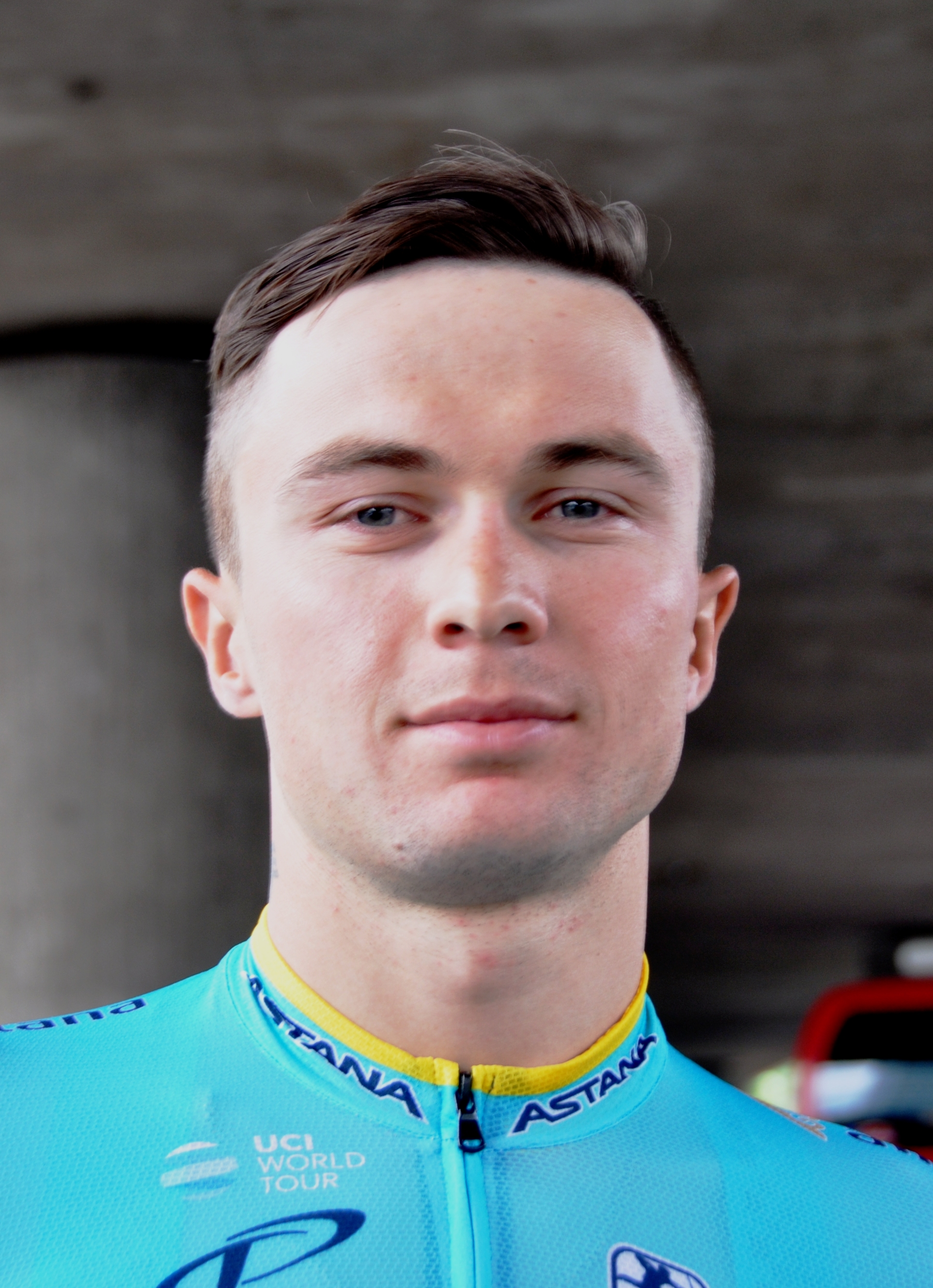
- Lutsenko at the 2017 Tour de France

Personal information
- Full name: Alexey Alexandrovich Lutsenko
- Born: 7 September 1992 (age 34) Petropavl, Kazakhstan
- Height: 1.74 m (5 ft 9 in)
- Weight: 74 kg (163 lb)

Cycling career
- Sport: Cycling
- Current team: NSN Cycling Team
- Discipline: Road
- Role: Rider
- Rider type: Rouleur

Professional teams
- 2012: Continental Team Astana
- 2013–2024: Astana
- 2025–: Israel–Premier Tech

Major wins
- Grand Tours Tour de France 1 individual stage (2020) Vuelta a España 1 individual stage (2017) Stage races Arctic Race of Norway (2019) Tour of Oman (2018, 2019) Tour of Hainan (2016) Single-day races and Classics National Road Race Championships (2018, 2019, 2023) National Time Trial Championships (2015, 2019, 2023)
Medal record
Men's road bicycle racing
Representing Kazakhstan
UCI Road World Championships
Gold medal – first place	2012 Valkenburg	Under-23 road race
Asian Games
Gold medal – first place	2014 Incheon	Time trial
Gold medal – first place	2018 Jakarta-Palembang	Road race
Gold medal – first place	2018 Jakarta-Palembang	Time trial
Gold medal – first place	2022 Hangzhou	Time trial
Gold medal – first place	2026 Aichi-Nagoya	Time trial
Silver medal – second place	2022 Hangzhou	Road race

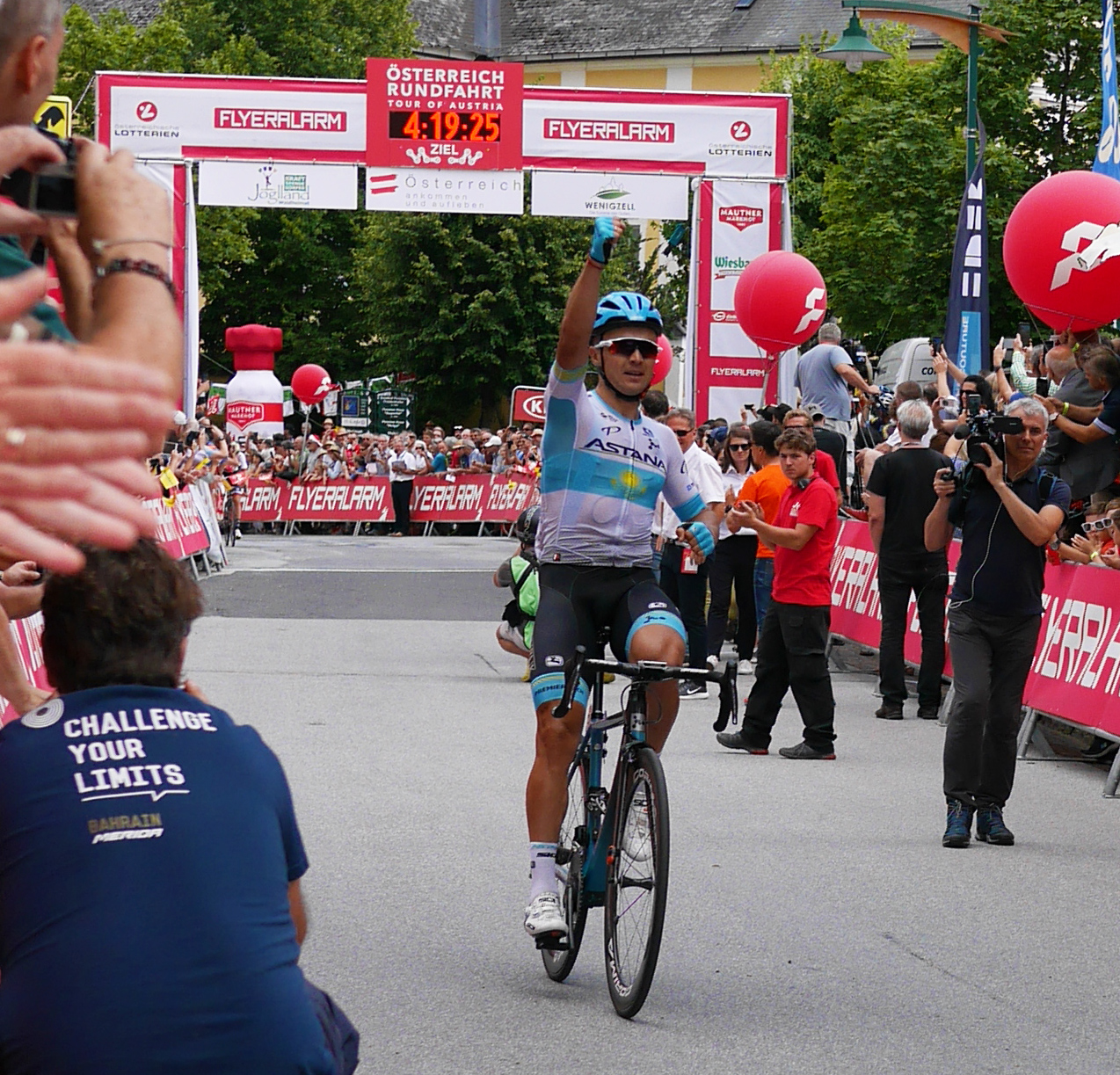
Lutsenko at the 2018 Tour of Austria, celebrating victory on the sixth stage

Alexey Alexandrovich Lutsenko (Kazakh: Алексей Александрович Луценко; born 7 September 1992) is a Kazakh professional cyclist, who rides for UCI ProTeam NSN Cycling Team.

== Career ==
In 2012 he won the under-23 road race at the UCI Road World Championships in the Netherlands. At the 2015 Tour de Suisse, Lutsenko put in an attack after the penultimate climb of the day and it led him to victory on stage 8.

In 2019, Lutsenko had his most prolific season to that point, with ten individual victories. His first start of the season, the Tour of Oman, saw him win three stages, the points classification and the overall general classification. After top-ten finishes at Omloop Het Nieuwsblad (fourth) and Strade Bianche (seventh), Lutsenko won a stage and the mountains classification at Tirreno–Adriatico. He finished seventh overall at the Critérium du Dauphiné, before winning both the time trial and the road race by more than a minute at the Kazakh National Road Championships. After finishing inside the top twenty placings at the Tour de France, Lutsenko won the Arctic Race of Norway on the final stage, overturning a three-second pre-stage deficit to Warren Barguil. He finished fourth at the Deutschland Tour and second at the Coppa Ugo Agostoni before two wins in three days, at the Coppa Sabatini and the Memorial Marco Pantani – becoming the latter race's first non-Italian winner.

At the start of the 2020 season, and prior to the COVID-19 pandemic-enforced suspension of racing, Lutsenko took third-place overall finishes at the Tour de la Provence (winning the points classification), and the UAE Tour. He then won the sixth stage of the Tour de France following a 17-kilometre (11-mile) solo attack. Lutsenko's next victory did not come until the 2021 Critérium du Dauphiné, when he won the fourth stage individual time trial. He moved into the race lead after the sixth stage, but ultimately finished second overall behind Richie Porte. He recorded his best overall finish at the Tour de France with a seventh-place finish in the 2021 edition, but took only one further victory during the rest of the year, at the Coppa Ugo Agostoni.

Lutsenko opened his 2022 season with victory in the inaugural edition of the Clásica Jaén Paraíso Interior, soloing the last 25 kilometres (16 miles) to the win. He finished inside the top ten placings at the Vuelta a Andalucía (ninth), missing out on a stage victory to Wout Poels in a two-up sprint in Baza. At the Tour de France, he worked his way up the general classification, moving into the top ten overall after two high stage finishes on consecutive summit finishes at Peyragudes and Hautacam. He ultimately finished 9th, almost 23 minutes down on race winner Jonas Vingegaard.

=== Retirement ===
Following the announcement of his retirement, Lutsenko announced that he would rejoin XDS Astana Team as head coach in 2027.

== Personal life ==
Lutsenko and his family live in Monaco.

== Major results ==
2010
Asian Junior Road Championships

1st Road race
2nd Time trial

3rd Overall 3-Etappen-Rundfahrt
9th Overall Driedaagse van Axel
2011
9th ZLM Tour
2012
1st Road race, UCI Under-23 Road World Championships
1st Stage 5 Tour de l'Avenir
1st Stage 1b Tour of Bulgaria
1st Stage 5 Giro della Valle d'Aosta
National Road Championships

2nd Road race
2nd Time trial

2nd Grand Prix des Marbriers
3rd Overall Coupe des nations Ville Saguenay
5th Gran Premio Nobili Rubinetterie
8th Overall Thüringen Rundfahrt der U23
2014 (2 pro wins)
1st Time trial, Asian Games
1st Tour of Almaty
4th Overall Danmark Rundt

1st Points classification
1st Stage 5 (ITT)

2015 (3)
1st Time trial, National Road Championships
1st Tour of Almaty
1st Stage 8 Tour de Suisse
2016 (4)
1st Overall Tour of Hainan

1st Stage 8

1st Tour of Almaty
1st Stage 5 Paris–Nice
3rd Overall Three Days of De Panne
2017 (3)
1st Team time trial, Asian Road Championships
1st Overall Tour of Almaty

1st Points classification
1st Stage 1

Vuelta a España

1st Stage 5
Combativity award Stage 5

3rd Dwars door Vlaanderen
9th Road race, UCI Road World Championships
2018 (5)
Asian Games

1st Road race
1st Time trial

National Road Championships

1st Road race
5th Time trial

1st Overall Tour of Oman
1st Stage 6 Tour of Austria
2nd Overall Tour of Turkey

1st Stage 4

2019 (10)
National Road Championships

1st Road race
1st Time trial

1st Overall Tour of Oman

1st Points classification
1st Stages 2, 3 & 5

1st Overall Arctic Race of Norway

1st Points classification

1st Coppa Sabatini
1st Memorial Marco Pantani
Tirreno–Adriatico

1st Mountains classification
1st Stage 4

2nd Coppa Ugo Agostoni
4th Overall Deutschland Tour
4th Omloop Het Nieuwsblad
7th Overall Critérium du Dauphiné
7th Strade Bianche
2020 (1)
1st Stage 6 Tour de France
3rd Overall Tour de la Provence

1st Points classification

3rd Overall UAE Tour
2021 (2)
1st Coppa Ugo Agostoni
2nd Overall Critérium du Dauphiné

1st Stage 4 (ITT)

2nd GP Miguel Induráin
4th Veneto Classic
7th Overall Tour de France
8th Overall Okolo Slovenska
2022 (1)
1st Clásica Jaén Paraíso Interior
8th Overall Tour de France
9th Overall Vuelta a Andalucía
2023 (9)
Asian Games

1st Time trial
2nd Road race

National Road Championships

1st Road race
1st Time trial

1st Overall Giro di Sicilia

1st Stage 4

1st Overall Tour of Turkey

1st Stage 3

1st Circuito de Getxo
1st Memorial Marco Pantani
5th Amstel Gold Race
5th Coppa Sabatini
2024 (2)
1st Overall Giro d'Abruzzo

1st Points classification
1st Mountains classification
1st Stage 3

3rd Trofeo Matteotti
8th Liège–Bastogne–Liège
2025
4th Overall Settimana Internazionale di Coppi e Bartali
2026 (2)
Asian Games

1st Road race
1st Time trial

=== General classification results timeline ===
Grand Tour general classification results
Grand Tour	2013	2014	2015	2016	2017	2018	2019	2020	2021	2022	2023	2024
Giro d'Italia	—	—	—	—	—	87	—	—	—	—	—	DNF
Tour de France	DNF	—	—	62	71	—	19	46	7	8	40	DNF
Vuelta a España	—	100	—	—	75	—	—	—	—	71	—	—
Major stage race general classification results
Stage races	2013	2014	2015	2016	2017	2018	2019	2020	2021	2022	2023	2024
Paris–Nice	—	—	—	71	48	—	—	—	DNF	—	—	DNF
Tirreno–Adriatico	—	85	64	—	—	15	13	—	—	—	DNF	—
Volta a Catalunya	Has not contested during his career											
Tour of the Basque Country	—	—	—	—	101	—	—	NH	78	—	—	—
Tour de Romandie	—	—	—	DNF	—	—	—	NH	DNF	—	DNF	DNF
Critérium du Dauphiné	69	—	—	75	48	—	7	35	2	—	—	—
Tour de Suisse	—	—	25	—	—	—	—	NH	—	19	DNF	65

Legend
—	Did not compete
DNF	Did not finish
IP	In progress
