= 2023 Volta ao Algarve =

Portuguese cycling race

2023 UCI ProSeries

Race details
- Dates: 15–19 February 2023
- Stages: 5

Results
Jersey awarded to the overall winner	Winner	Daniel Martínez (COL)	(Ineos Grenadiers)
	Second	Filippo Ganna (ITA)	(Ineos Grenadiers)
	Third	Ilan Van Wilder (BEL)	(Soudal–Quick-Step)
Jersey awarded to the points classification winner	Points	Magnus Cort (DEN)	(EF Education–EasyPost)
Jersey awarded to the mountains classification winner	Mountains	Kasper Asgreen (DEN)	(Soudal–Quick-Step)
Jersey awarded to the youth classification winner	Youth	Oscar Onley (GBR)	(Team DSM)
	Team	(United Kingdom) Ineos Grenadiers	

The 2023 Volta ao Algarve (English: Tour of the Algarve) was a road cycling stage race that took place between 15 and 19 February 2023 in the Algarve region of southern Portugal. The race was rated as a category 2.Pro event on the 2023 UCI ProSeries calendar, and was the 49th edition of the Volta ao Algarve.

== Teams ==
12 of the 18 UCI WorldTeams, four UCI ProTeams, and nine UCI Continental teams made up the 25 teams that participated in the race. Team Jumbo–Visma were the only team not to enter a full squad of seven riders.

UCI WorldTeams

- Arkéa–Samsic
- Alpecin–Deceuninck
- Bora–Hansgrohe
- EF Education–EasyPost
- Groupama–FDJ
- Ineos Grenadiers
- Intermarché–Circus–Wanty
- Soudal–Quick-Step
- Team Jumbo–Visma
- Team DSM
- Trek–Segafredo
- UAE Team Emirates

UCI ProTeams

- Caja Rural–Seguros RGA
- Human Powered Health
- Tudor Pro Cycling Team
- Uno-X Pro Cycling Team

UCI Continental Teams

- ABTF Betão–Feirense
- AP Hotels & Resorts–Tavira–SC Farense
- Aviludo–Louletano–Loulé Concelho
- Efapel Cycling
- Glassdrive–Q8–Anicolor
- Kelly / Simoldes / UDO
- Credibom / LA Alumínios / Marcos Car
- Rádio Popular–Paredes–Boavista
- Tavfer–Ovos Matinados–Mortágua

== Route ==
Stage characteristics and winners
Stage	Date	Course	Distance	Type	Stage winner
1	15 February	Portimão to Lagos	200.2 km (124.4 mi)	Flat stage	Alexander Kristoff (NOR)
2	16 February	Sagres to Alto da Fóia	186.3 km (115.8 mi)	Mountain stage	Magnus Cort (DEN)
3	17 February	Faro to Tavira	203.1 km (126.2 mi)	Flat stage	Magnus Cort (DEN)
4	18 February	Albufeira to Alto do Malhão	177.9 km (110.5 mi)	Hilly stage	Tom Pidcock (GBR)
5	19 February	Lagoa to Lagoa	24 km (15 mi)	Individual time trial	Stefan Küng (SUI)
Total			754.7 km (468.9 mi)		

== Stages ==
=== Stage 1 ===
15 February 2023 – Portimão to Lagos, 200.2 km (124.4 mi)

Stage 1 Result (1–10)
Rank	Rider	Team	Time
1	Alexander Kristoff (NOR)	Uno-X Pro Cycling Team	4h 49' 25"
2	Jordi Meeus (BEL)	Bora–Hansgrohe	+ 0"
3	Søren Wærenskjold (NOR)	Uno-X Pro Cycling Team	+ 0"
4	Fabio Jakobsen (NED)	Soudal–Quick-Step	+ 0"
5	Pavel Bittner (CZE)	Team DSM	+ 0"
6	Paul Penhoët (FRA)	Groupama–FDJ	+ 0"
7	Natnael Tesfatsion (ERI)	Trek–Segafredo	+ 0"
8	Timo Kielich (BEL)	Alpecin–Deceuninck	+ 0"
9	Edward Theuns (BEL)	Trek–Segafredo	+ 0"
10	Tim van Dijke (NED)	Team Jumbo–Visma	+ 0"

General classification after Stage 1 (1–10)
Rank	Rider	Team	Time
1	Alexander Kristoff (NOR)	Uno-X Pro Cycling Team	4h 49' 15"
2	Jordi Meeus (BEL)	Bora–Hansgrohe	+ 4"
3	Søren Wærenskjold (NOR)	Uno-X Pro Cycling Team	+ 6"
4	Fabio Jakobsen (NED)	Soudal–Quick-Step	+ 10"
5	Pavel Bittner (CZE)	Team DSM	+ 10"
6	Paul Penhoët (FRA)	Groupama–FDJ	+ 10"
7	Natnael Tesfatsion (ERI)	Trek–Segafredo	+ 10"
8	Timo Kielich (BEL)	Alpecin–Deceuninck	+ 10"
9	Edward Theuns (BEL)	Trek–Segafredo	+ 10"
10	Tim van Dijke (NED)	Team Jumbo–Visma	+ 10"

=== Stage 2 ===
16 February 2023 – Sagres to Alto da Fóia, 186.3 km (115.8 mi)

Stage 2 Result (1–10)
Rank	Rider	Team	Time
1	Magnus Cort (DEN)	EF Education–EasyPost	5h 07' 05"
2	Ilan Van Wilder (BEL)	Soudal–Quick-Step	+ 0"
3	Rui Costa (POR)	Intermarché–Circus–Wanty	+ 0"
4	Valentin Madouas (FRA)	Groupama–FDJ	+ 0"
5	Jai Hindley (AUS)	Bora–Hansgrohe	+ 0"
6	Rune Herregodts (BEL)	Intermarché–Circus–Wanty	+ 2"
7	Nicola Conci (ITA)	Alpecin–Deceuninck	+ 2"
8	Tom Pidcock (GBR)	Ineos Grenadiers	+ 2"
9	Kevin Vermaerke (USA)	Team DSM	+ 2"
10	Bauke Mollema (NED)	Trek–Segafredo	+ 2"

General classification after Stage 2 (1–10)
Rank	Rider	Team	Time
1	Magnus Cort (DEN)	EF Education–EasyPost	9h 56' 20"
2	Ilan Van Wilder (BEL)	Soudal–Quick-Step	+ 4"
3	Rui Costa (POR)	Intermarché–Circus–Wanty	+ 6"
4	Jai Hindley (AUS)	Bora–Hansgrohe	+ 10"
5	Valentin Madouas (FRA)	Groupama–FDJ	+ 10"
6	Tobias Foss (NOR)	Team Jumbo–Visma	+ 12"
7	Bauke Mollema (NED)	Trek–Segafredo	+ 12"
8	Nicola Conci (ITA)	Alpecin–Deceuninck	+ 12"
9	João Almeida (POR)	UAE Team Emirates	+ 12"
10	Sergio Higuita (COL)	Bora–Hansgrohe	+ 12"

=== Stage 3 ===
17 February 2023 – Faro to Tavira, 203.1 km (126.2 mi)

Stage 3 Result (1–10)
Rank	Rider	Team	Time
1	Magnus Cort (DEN)	EF Education–EasyPost	5h 05' 14"
2	Filippo Ganna (ITA)	Ineos Grenadiers	+ 0"
3	Jordi Meeus (BEL)	Bora–Hansgrohe	+ 0"
4	Paul Penhoët (FRA)	Groupama–FDJ	+ 0"
5	Valentin Madouas (AUS)	Groupama–FDJ	+ 0"
6	Rui Oliveira (POR)	UAE Team Emirates	+ 0"
7	Rui Costa (POR)	Intermarché–Circus–Wanty	+ 0"
8	Tobias Foss (NOR)	Team Jumbo–Visma	+ 0"
9	Edward Theuns (BEL)	Trek–Segafredo	+ 0"
10	Lewis Askey (GBR)	Groupama–FDJ	+ 0"

General classification after Stage 3 (1–10)
Rank	Rider	Team	Time
1	Magnus Cort (DEN)	EF Education–EasyPost	15h 01' 18"
2	Rui Costa (POR)	Intermarché–Circus–Wanty	+ 18"
3	Ilan Van Wilder (BEL)	Soudal–Quick-Step	+ 20"
4	Valentin Madouas (FRA)	Groupama–FDJ	+ 26"
5	Jai Hindley (AUS)	Bora–Hansgrohe	+ 26"
6	Tom Pidcock (GBR)	Ineos Grenadiers	+ 26"
7	Filippo Ganna (ITA)	Ineos Grenadiers	+ 27"
8	Tobias Foss (NOR)	Team Jumbo–Visma	+ 28"
9	Bauke Mollema (NED)	Trek–Segafredo	+ 28"
10	João Almeida (POR)	UAE Team Emirates	+ 28"

=== Stage 4 ===
18 February 2023 – Albufeira to Alto do Malhão, 177.9 km (110.5 mi)

Stage 4 Result (1–10)
Rank	Rider	Team	Time
1	Tom Pidcock (GBR)	Ineos Grenadiers	4h 28' 39"
2	João Almeida (POR)	UAE Team Emirates	+ 1"
3	Ilan Van Wilder (BEL)	Soudal–Quick-Step	+ 5"
4	Sergio Higuita (COL)	Bora–Hansgrohe	+ 5"
5	Jai Hindley (AUS)	Bora–Hansgrohe	+ 11"
6	Daniel Martínez (COL)	Ineos Grenadiers	+ 11"
7	Oscar Onley (GBR)	Team DSM	+ 14"
8	Bauke Mollema (NED)	Trek–Segafredo	+ 20"
9	Tobias Foss (NOR)	Team Jumbo–Visma	+ 21"
10	Filippo Ganna (ITA)	Ineos Grenadiers	+ 21"

General classification after Stage 4 (1–10)
Rank	Rider	Team	Time
1	Tom Pidcock (GBR)	Ineos Grenadiers	19h 30' 13"
2	Ilan Van Wilder (BEL)	Soudal–Quick-Step	+ 5"
3	João Almeida (POR)	UAE Team Emirates	+ 7"
4	Sergio Higuita (COL)	Bora–Hansgrohe	+ 17"
5	Jai Hindley (AUS)	Bora–Hansgrohe	+ 21"
6	Rui Costa (POR)	Intermarché–Circus–Wanty	+ 23"
7	Daniel Martínez (COL)	Ineos Grenadiers	+ 23"
8	Magnus Cort (DEN)	EF Education–EasyPost	+ 27"
9	Filippo Ganna (ITA)	Ineos Grenadiers	+ 32"
10	Bauke Mollema (NED)	Trek–Segafredo	+ 32"

=== Stage 5 ===
19 February 2023 – Lagoa to Lagoa, 24 km (15 mi) (ITT)

Stage 5 Result (1–10)
Rank	Rider	Team	Time
1	Stefan Küng (SUI)	Groupama–FDJ	29' 34"
2	Rémi Cavagna (FRA)	Soudal–Quick-Step	+ 4"
3	Filippo Ganna (ITA)	Ineos Grenadiers	+ 10"
4	Daniel Martínez (COL)	Ineos Grenadiers	+ 16"
5	Tobias Foss (NOR)	Team Jumbo–Visma	+ 29"
6	Thymen Arensman (NED)	Ineos Grenadiers	+ 32"
7	Ilan Van Wilder (BEL)	Soudal–Quick-Step	+ 49"
8	Bauke Mollema (NED)	Trek–Segafredo	+ 56"
9	Nils Politt (GER)	Bora–Hansgrohe	+ 1' 03"
10	Rune Herregodts (BEL)	Intermarché–Circus–Wanty	+ 1' 03"

General classification after Stage 5 (1–10)
Rank	Rider	Team	Time
1	Daniel Martínez (COL)	Ineos Grenadiers	20h 00' 26"
2	Filippo Ganna (ITA)	Ineos Grenadiers	+ 2"
3	Ilan Van Wilder (BEL)	Soudal–Quick-Step	+ 15"
4	Tobias Foss (NOR)	Team Jumbo–Visma	+ 22"
5	Stefan Küng (SUI)	Groupama–FDJ	+ 26"
6	João Almeida (POR)	UAE Team Emirates	+ 40"
7	Tom Pidcock (GBR)	Ineos Grenadiers	+ 48"
8	Bauke Mollema (NED)	Trek–Segafredo	+ 49"
9	Magnus Cort (DEN)	EF Education–EasyPost	+ 55"
10	Rui Costa (POR)	Intermarché–Circus–Wanty	+ 1' 06"

== Classification leadership table ==
Classification leadership by stage
Stage	Winner	General classification	Points classification	Mountains classification	Young rider classification	Team classification
1	Alexander Kristoff	Alexander Kristoff	Alexander Kristoff	António Ferreira	Pavel Bittner	Trek–Segafredo
2	Magnus Cort	Magnus Cort	Alexander Kristoff	António Ferreira	Frederik Wandahl	EF Education–EasyPost
3	Magnus Cort	Magnus Cort	Magnus Cort	António Ferreira	Frederik Wandahl	EF Education–EasyPost
4	Tom Pidcock	Tom Pidcock	Magnus Cort	Kasper Asgreen	Oscar Onley	Ineos Grenadiers
5	Stefan Küng	Daniel Martínez	Magnus Cort	Kasper Asgreen	Oscar Onley	Ineos Grenadiers
Final		Daniel Martínez	Magnus Cort	Kasper Asgreen	Oscar Onley	Ineos Grenadiers

== Final classification standings ==
Legend
Denotes the winner of the general classification	Denotes the winner of the mountains classification
Denotes the winner of the points classification	Denotes the winner of the young rider classification

=== General classification ===
Final general classification (1–10)
Rank	Rider	Team	Time
1	Daniel Martínez (COL)	Ineos Grenadiers	20h 00' 26"
2	Filippo Ganna (ITA)	Ineos Grenadiers	+ 2"
3	Ilan Van Wilder (BEL)	Soudal–Quick-Step	+ 15"
4	Tobias Foss (NOR)	Team Jumbo–Visma	+ 22"
5	Stefan Küng (SUI)	Groupama–FDJ	+ 26"
6	João Almeida (POR)	UAE Team Emirates	+ 40"
7	Tom Pidcock (GBR)	Ineos Grenadiers	+ 48"
8	Bauke Mollema (NED)	Trek–Segafredo	+ 49"
9	Magnus Cort (DEN)	EF Education–EasyPost	+ 55"
10	Rui Costa (POR)	Intermarché–Circus–Wanty	+ 1' 06"

=== Points classification ===
Final points classification (1–10)
Rank	Rider	Team	Time
1	Magnus Cort (DEN)	EF Education–EasyPost	46
2	Jordi Meeus (BEL)	Bora–Hansgrohe	36
3	Alexander Kristoff (NOR)	Uno-X Pro Cycling Team	25
4	Ilan Van Wilder (BEL)	Soudal–Quick-Step	22
5	Filippo Ganna (ITA)	Ineos Grenadiers	21
6	Paul Penhoët (FRA)	Groupama–FDJ	21
7	Rui Costa (POR)	Intermarché–Circus–Wanty	20
8	Tom Pidcock (GBR)	Ineos Grenadiers	14
9	Fabio Jakobsen (NED)	Soudal–Quick-Step	13
10	João Almeida (POR)	UAE Team Emirates	12

=== Mountains classification ===
Final mountains classification (1–10)
Rank	Rider	Team	Time
1	Kasper Asgreen (DEN)	Soudal–Quick-Step	18
2	Ilan Van Wilder (BEL)	Soudal–Quick-Step	13
3	António Ferreira (POR)	Kelly / Simoldes / UDO	12
4	Rafael Lourenço (POR)	AP Hotels & Resorts–Tavira–SC Farense	11
5	Magnus Cort (DEN)	EF Education–EasyPost	10
6	Tom Pidcock (GBR)	Ineos Grenadiers	6
7	Kobe Goossens (BEL)	Intermarché–Circus–Wanty	6
8	Rui Costa (POR)	Intermarché–Circus–Wanty	6
9	Mathias Vacek (CZE)	Trek–Segafredo	6
10	João Almeida (POR)	UAE Team Emirates	4

=== Young rider classification ===
Final young rider classification (1–10)
Rank	Rider	Team	Time
1	Oscar Onley (GBR)	Team DSM	20h 01' 50"
2	Frederik Wandahl (DEN)	Bora–Hansgrohe	+ 1' 17"
3	Finn Fisher-Black (NZL)	UAE Team Emirates	+ 1' 44"
4	Mathias Vacek (CZE)	Trek–Segafredo	+ 23' 50"
5	Paul Penhoët (FRA)	Groupama–FDJ	+ 28' 54"
6	Lewis Askey (GBR)	Groupama–FDJ	+ 32' 06"
7	Pavel Bittner (CZE)	Team DSM	+ 35' 00"
8	Madis Mihkels (EST)	Intermarché–Circus–Wanty	+ 36' 29"
9	Roel van Sintmaartensdijk (NED)	Intermarché–Circus–Wanty	+ 40' 53"
10	Pedro Silva (POR)	Glassdrive–Q8–Anicolor	+ 45' 22"

=== Team classification ===
Final team classification (1–10)
Rank	Team	Time
1	(United Kingdom) Ineos Grenadiers	60h 01' 31"
2	(Germany) Bora–Hansgrohe	+ 4' 25"
3	(Belgium) Intermarché–Circus–Wanty	+ 8' 54"
4	(United States) EF Education–EasyPost	+ 9' 24"
5	(United States) Trek–Segafredo	+ 12' 49"
6	(France) Arkéa–Samsic	+ 12' 50"
7	(Belgium) Soudal–Quick-Step	+ 17' 01"
8	(Belgium) Alpecin–Deceuninck	+ 18' 29"
9	(France) Groupama–FDJ	+ 21' 40"
10	(United Arab Emirates) UAE Team Emirates	+ 25' 06"
