= 2020 Tour de la Provence =

2020 UCI Europe Tour 2020 UCI ProSeries

Race details
- Dates: 13–16 February 2020
- Stages: 4
- Distance: 635.1 km (394.6 mi)
- Winning time: 15h 31' 50"

Results
Jersey awarded to the overall winner	Winner	Nairo Quintana (COL)	(Arkéa–Samsic)
	Second	Aleksandr Vlasov (RUS)	(Astana)
	Third	Alexey Lutsenko (KAZ)	(Astana)
Jersey awarded to the points classification winner	Points	Alexey Lutsenko (KAZ)	(Astana)
Jersey awarded to the mountains classification winner	Mountains	Jonas Koch (GER)	(CCC Team)
Jersey awarded to the young rider classification winner	Young rider	Aleksandr Vlasov (RUS)	(Astana)
Jersey awarded to the team classification winner	Team	Astana	

The 2020 Tour de la Provence was a road cycling stage race that took place between 13 and 16 February 2020 in the French region of Provence. The race is rated as a 2.Pro event as part of the 2020 UCI Europe Tour and the 2020 UCI ProSeries, and was the fifth edition of the Tour de la Provence cycling race.

== Teams ==
Twenty-one teams were invited to the race. Of these teams, fourteen are UCI WorldTour teams, five are UCI Professional Continental teams, and two are UCI Continental teams. Each team entered seven riders, except for B&B Hotels–Vital Concept and Team Jumbo–Visma, who each entered six riders. Of the starting peloton of 145 riders, only 126 riders finished.

UCI WorldTeams

- AG2R La Mondiale
- Astana
- CCC Team
- Cofidis
- Deceuninck–Quick-Step
- EF Pro Cycling
- Groupama–FDJ
- Israel Start-Up Nation
- Movistar Team
- NTT Pro Cycling
- Team INEOS
- Team Jumbo–Visma
- Team Sunweb
- Trek–Segafredo

UCI Professional Continental Teams

- Arkéa–Samsic
- B&B Hotels–Vital Concept
- Circus–Wanty Gobert
- Nippo–Delko–One Provence
- Total Direct Énergie

UCI Continental Teams

- Natura4Ever–Roubaix–Lille Métropole
- St. Michel–Auber93

== Route ==
Stage characteristics and winners
Stage	Date	Course	Distance	Type	Stage winner
1	13 February	Châteaurenard to Saintes-Maries-de-la-Mer	149.5 km (92.9 mi)	Flat stage	Nacer Bouhanni (FRA)
2	14 February	Aubagne to La Ciotat	174.9 km (108.7 mi)	Hilly stage	Aleksandr Vlasov (RUS)
3	15 February	Istres to Mont Ventoux–Chalet Reynard	140.2 km (87.1 mi)	Mountain stage	Nairo Quintana (COL)
4	16 February	Avignon to Aix-en-Provence	170.5 km (105.9 mi)	Hilly stage	Owain Doull (GBR)
Total		635.1 km (394.6 mi)			

== Stages ==
=== Stage 1 ===
13 February 2020 – Châteaurenard to Saintes-Maries-de-la-Mer, 149.5 km (92.9 mi)

Stage 1 Result
Rank	Rider	Team	Time
1	Nacer Bouhanni (FRA)	Arkéa–Samsic	3h 16' 35"
2	Jakub Mareczko (ITA)	CCC Team	+ 0"
3	Giacomo Nizzolo (ITA)	NTT Pro Cycling	+ 0"
4	Pierre Barbier (FRA)	Nippo–Delko–One Provence	+ 0"
5	Hugo Hofstetter (FRA)	Israel Start-Up Nation	+ 0"
6	Chris Lawless (GBR)	Team INEOS	+ 0"
7	Timothy Dupont (BEL)	Circus–Wanty Gobert	+ 0"
8	Kasper Asgreen (DEN)	Deceuninck–Quick-Step	+ 0"
9	Marc Hirschi (SUI)	Team Sunweb	+ 0"
10	Quinn Simmons (USA)	Trek–Segafredo	+ 0"

General classification after Stage 1
Rank	Rider	Team	Time
1	Nacer Bouhanni (FRA)	Arkéa–Samsic	3h 16' 25"
2	Jakub Mareczko (ITA)	CCC Team	+ 4"
3	Giacomo Nizzolo (ITA)	NTT Pro Cycling	+ 6"
4	Charlie Quarterman (GBR)	Trek–Segafredo	+ 6"
5	Johan Jacobs (SUI)	Movistar Team	+ 6"
6	Louis Louvet (FRA)	St. Michel–Auber93	+ 7"
7	Romain Combaud (FRA)	Nippo–Delko–One Provence	+ 9"
8	Pierre Barbier (FRA)	Nippo–Delko–One Provence	+ 10"
9	Hugo Hofstetter (FRA)	Israel Start-Up Nation	+ 10"
10	Chris Lawless (GBR)	Team INEOS	+ 10"

=== Stage 2 ===
14 February 2020 – Aubagne to La Ciotat, 174.9 km (108.7 mi)

Stage 2 Result
Rank	Rider	Team	Time
1	Aleksandr Vlasov (RUS)	Astana	4h 30' 57"
2	Wilco Kelderman (NED)	Team Sunweb	+ 24"
3	Alexey Lutsenko (KAZ)	Astana	+ 24"
4	Magnus Cort (DEN)	EF Pro Cycling	+ 24"
5	Andrea Bagioli (ITA)	Deceuninck–Quick-Step	+ 24"
6	Eddie Dunbar (IRL)	Team INEOS	+ 24"
7	Thibaut Pinot (FRA)	Groupama–FDJ	+ 24"
8	Nairo Quintana (COL)	Arkéa–Samsic	+ 24"
9	Aurélien Paret-Peintre (FRA)	AG2R La Mondiale	+ 24"
10	David Gaudu (FRA)	Groupama–FDJ	+ 24"

General classification after Stage 2
Rank	Rider	Team	Time
1	Aleksandr Vlasov (RUS)	Astana	7h 47' 22"
2	Wilco Kelderman (NED)	Team Sunweb	+ 28"
3	Alexey Lutsenko (KAZ)	Astana	+ 30"
4	Magnus Cort (DEN)	EF Pro Cycling	+ 34"
5	Alex Aranburu (ESP)	Astana	+ 34"
6	Aurélien Paret-Peintre (FRA)	AG2R La Mondiale	+ 34"
7	Thibaut Pinot (FRA)	Groupama–FDJ	+ 34"
8	Nairo Quintana (COL)	Arkéa–Samsic	+ 34"
9	Eddie Dunbar (IRL)	Team INEOS	+ 34"
10	David Gaudu (FRA)	Groupama–FDJ	+ 34"

=== Stage 3 ===
15 February 2020 – Istres to Mont Ventoux–Chalet Reynard, 140.2 km (87.1 mi)

Stage 3 Result
Rank	Rider	Team	Time
1	Nairo Quintana (COL)	Arkéa–Samsic	3h 36' 26"
2	Alexey Lutsenko (KAZ)	Astana	+ 1' 28"
3	Hugh Carthy (GBR)	EF Pro Cycling	+ 1' 28"
4	Aleksandr Vlasov (RUS)	Astana	+ 1' 28"
5	Eddie Dunbar (IRL)	Team INEOS	+ 2' 11"
6	Sepp Kuss (USA)	Team Jumbo–Visma	+ 2' 12"
7	Wilco Kelderman (NED)	Team Sunweb	+ 2' 12"
8	Jesús Herrada (ESP)	Cofidis	+ 2' 12"
9	Thibaut Pinot (FRA)	Groupama–FDJ	+ 2' 12"
10	David Gaudu (FRA)	Groupama–FDJ	+ 2' 25"

General classification after Stage 3
Rank	Rider	Team	Time
1	Nairo Quintana (COL)	Arkéa–Samsic	11h 24' 12"
2	Aleksandr Vlasov (RUS)	Astana	+ 1' 04"
3	Alexey Lutsenko (KAZ)	Astana	+ 1' 28"
4	Hugh Carthy (GBR)	EF Pro Cycling	+ 1' 38"
5	Wilco Kelderman (NED)	Team Sunweb	+ 2' 16"
6	Eddie Dunbar (IRL)	Team INEOS	+ 2' 21"
7	Thibaut Pinot (FRA)	Groupama–FDJ	+ 2' 22"
8	Sepp Kuss (USA)	Team Jumbo–Visma	+ 2' 26"
9	Jesús Herrada (ESP)	Cofidis	+ 2' 26"
10	David Gaudu (FRA)	Groupama–FDJ	+ 2' 35"

=== Stage 4 ===
16 February 2020 – Avignon to Aix-en-Provence, 170.5 km (105.9 mi)

Stage 4 Result
Rank	Rider	Team	Time
1	Owain Doull (GBR)	Team INEOS	4h 07' 32"
2	Matthias Brändle (AUT)	Israel Start-Up Nation	+ 0"
3	Ian Garrison (USA)	Deceuninck–Quick-Step	+ 2"
4	Romain Combaud (FRA)	Nippo–Delko–One Provence	+ 2"
5	Alexey Lutsenko (KAZ)	Astana	+ 6"
6	Damien Touzé (FRA)	Cofidis	+ 6"
7	Pascal Eenkhoorn (NED)	Team Jumbo–Visma	+ 6"
8	Magnus Cort (DEN)	EF Pro Cycling	+ 6"
9	Kasper Asgreen (DEN)	Deceuninck–Quick-Step	+ 6"
10	Quinn Simmons (USA)	Trek–Segafredo	+ 6"

General classification after Stage 4
Rank	Rider	Team	Time
1	Nairo Quintana (COL)	Arkéa–Samsic	15h 31' 50"
2	Aleksandr Vlasov (RUS)	Astana	+ 1' 04"
3	Alexey Lutsenko (KAZ)	Astana	+ 1' 28"
4	Hugh Carthy (GBR)	EF Pro Cycling	+ 1' 38"
5	Wilco Kelderman (NED)	Team Sunweb	+ 2' 16"
6	Eddie Dunbar (IRL)	Team INEOS	+ 2' 21"
7	Thibaut Pinot (FRA)	Groupama–FDJ	+ 2' 22"
8	Sepp Kuss (USA)	Team Jumbo–Visma	+ 2' 26"
9	Jesús Herrada (ESP)	Cofidis	+ 2' 26"
10	David Gaudu (FRA)	Groupama–FDJ	+ 2' 35"

== Classification leadership table ==
Classification leadership by stage
Stage	Winner	General classification	Points classification	Mountains classification	Young rider classification	Teams classification
1	Nacer Bouhanni	Nacer Bouhanni	Nacer Bouhanni	Charlie Quarterman	Charlie Quarterman	Team Sunweb
2	Aleksandr Vlasov	Aleksandr Vlasov	Aleksandr Vlasov	Jonas Koch	Aleksandr Vlasov	Astana
3	Nairo Quintana	Nairo Quintana	Aleksandr Vlasov	Jonas Koch	Aleksandr Vlasov	Astana
4	Owain Doull	Nairo Quintana	Alexey Lutsenko	Jonas Koch	Aleksandr Vlasov	Astana
Final		Nairo Quintana	Alexey Lutsenko	Jonas Koch	Aleksandr Vlasov	Astana

== Classification standings ==
=== General classification ===
Final general classification (1–10)
Rank	Rider	Team	Time
1	Nairo Quintana (COL)	Arkéa–Samsic	15h 31' 50"
2	Aleksandr Vlasov (RUS)	Astana	+ 1' 04"
3	Alexey Lutsenko (KAZ)	Astana	+ 1' 28"
4	Hugh Carthy (GBR)	EF Pro Cycling	+ 1' 38"
5	Wilco Kelderman (NED)	Team Sunweb	+ 2' 16"
6	Eddie Dunbar (IRL)	Team INEOS	+ 2' 21"
7	Thibaut Pinot (FRA)	Groupama–FDJ	+ 2' 22"
8	Sepp Kuss (USA)	Team Jumbo–Visma	+ 2' 26"
9	Jesús Herrada (ESP)	Cofidis	+ 2' 26"
10	David Gaudu (FRA)	Groupama–FDJ	+ 2' 35"

=== Points classification ===
Final points classification (1–10)
Rank	Rider	Team	Points
1	Alexey Lutsenko (KAZ)	Astana	30
2	Aleksandr Vlasov (RUS)	Astana	24
3	Nairo Quintana (COL)	Arkéa–Samsic	20
4	Wilco Kelderman (NED)	Team Sunweb	18
5	Owain Doull (GBR)	Team INEOS	15
6	Romain Combaud (FRA)	Nippo–Delko–One Provence	15
7	Eddie Dunbar (IRL)	Team INEOS	15
8	Magnus Cort (DEN)	EF Pro Cycling	14
9	Rémi Cavagna (FRA)	Deceuninck–Quick-Step	13
10	Ian Garrison (USA)	Deceuninck–Quick-Step	13

=== Mountains classification ===
Final mountains classification (1–10)
Rank	Rider	Team	Points
1	Jonas Koch (GER)	CCC Team	18
2	Victor Lafay (FRA)	Cofidis	14
3	Romain Combaud (FRA)	Nippo–Delko–One Provence	13
4	Johan Jacobs (SUI)	Movistar Team	8
5	Nairo Quintana (COL)	Arkéa–Samsic	7
6	Ian Garrison (USA)	Deceuninck–Quick-Step	7
7	Cyril Barthe (FRA)	B&B Hotels–Vital Concept	7
8	Alexey Lutsenko (KAZ)	Astana	5
9	Owain Doull (GBR)	Team INEOS	4
10	Timothy Dupont (BEL)	Circus–Wanty Gobert	4

=== Young rider classification ===
Final young rider classification (1–10)
Rank	Rider	Team	Time
1	Aleksandr Vlasov (RUS)	Astana	15h 32' 54"
2	Eddie Dunbar (IRL)	Team INEOS	+ 1' 17"
3	David Gaudu (FRA)	Groupama–FDJ	+ 1' 31"
4	Aurélien Paret-Peintre (FRA)	AG2R La Mondiale	+ 1' 40"
5	Niklas Eg (DEN)	Trek–Segafredo	+ 2' 46"
6	Andrea Bagioli (ITA)	Deceuninck–Quick-Step	+ 2' 51"
7	Sam Oomen (NED)	Team Sunweb	+ 3' 05"
8	Pavel Sivakov (RUS)	Team INEOS	+ 3' 40"
9	Attila Valter (HUN)	CCC Team	+ 4' 41"
10	Rémy Rochas (FRA)	Nippo–Delko–One Provence	+ 4' 42"

=== Teams classification ===
Final teams classification (1–10)
Rank	Team	Time
1	Astana	46h 43' 02"
2	Groupama–FDJ	+ 1' 55"
3	EF Pro Cycling	+ 2' 38"
4	Team Sunweb	+ 3' 42"
5	Team Jumbo–Visma	+ 3' 49"
6	AG2R La Mondiale	+ 6' 02"
7	Nippo–Delko–One Provence	+ 8' 19"
8	CCC Team	+ 9' 24"
9	NTT Pro Cycling	+ 9' 41"
10	Arkéa–Samsic	+ 11' 07"
