= Brassac-les-Mines =

- Commune
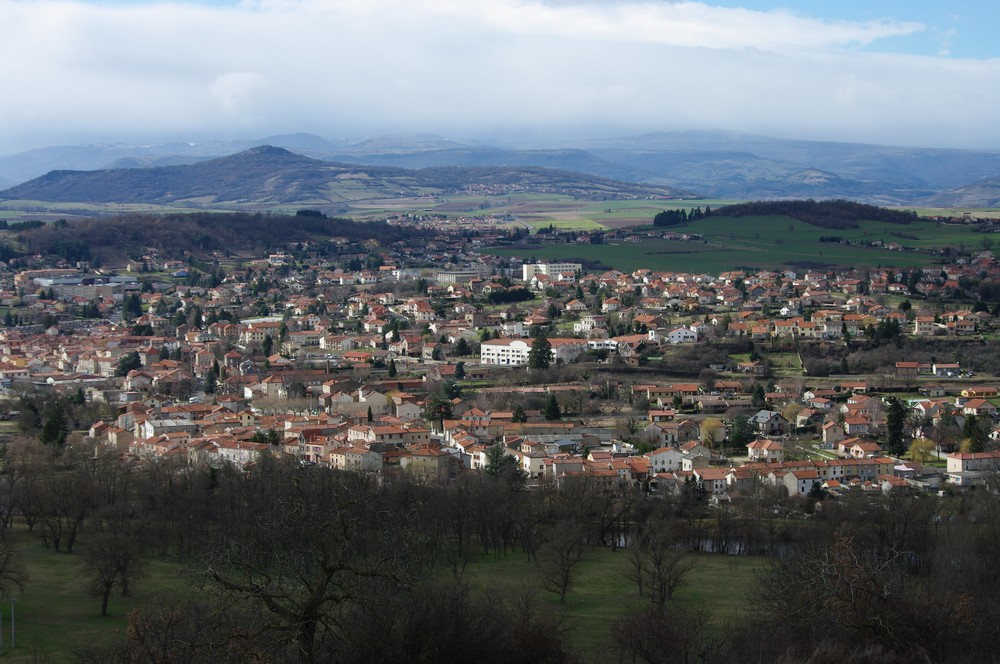
- View of the town from Marnat.

- Coat of arms
- Location of Brassac-les-Mines
- Location within France Location within Auvergne-Rhône-Alpes
- Coordinates: 45°24′53″N 3°19′47″E
- Country: France
- Region: Auvergne-Rhône-Alpes
- Department: Puy-de-Dôme
- Arrondissement: Issoire
- Canton: Brassac-les-Mines
- Intercommunality: Agglo Pays d'Issoire

Government
  - Mayor (2026–32): Fabien Besseyre
- Area^{1}: 7.20 km^{2} (2.78 sq mi)
- Elevation: 409 m (1,342 ft)
- Highest elevation: 533 m (1,749 ft)
- Lowest elevation: 395 m (1,296 ft)
- Population (2023): 3,412
  - Density: 474/km^{2} (1,230/sq mi)
- Time zone: UTC+01:00 (CET)
  - Summer (DST): UTC+02:00 (CEST)
- INSEE/Postal code: 63050 /63570
- Website: www.brassaclesmines.fr
- ^{1} French Land Register data, which excludes lakes, ponds, glaciers > 1 km^{2} (0.386 sq mi or 247 acres) and river estuaries.

Brassac-les-Mines (French pronunciation: [bʁasak le min]; Auvergnat: Braçac) is a commune in the Puy-de-Dôme department in Auvergne-Rhône-Alpes in central France. It is the seat of the canton of Brassac-les-Mines.

Tango composer Pablo Caliero was born in Brassac-les-Mines.

== Population ==
Historical population
Year	Pop.	±% p.a.
1968	3,685	—
1975	4,040	+1.32%
1982	3,883	−0.56%
1990	3,446	−1.48%
1999	3,249	−0.65%
2007	3,275	+0.10%
2012	3,300	+0.15%
2017	3,311	+0.07%
2023	3,412	+0.50%
Source: INSEE

== See also ==
- Communes of the Puy-de-Dôme department
