= 2020 Giro dell'Emilia =

2020 UCI Europe Tour 2020 UCI ProSeries

Race details
- Dates: 18 August 2020
- Stages: 1
- Distance: 199.7 km (124.1 mi)
- Winning time: 4h 59' 38"

Results
	Winner	Aleksandr Vlasov (RUS)	(Astana)
	Second	João Almeida (POR)	(Deceuninck–Quick-Step)
	Third	Diego Ulissi (ITA)	(UAE Team Emirates)

The 2020 Giro dell'Emilia was the 103rd edition of the Giro dell'Emilia road cycling one-day race. It was held on 18 August 2020 as part of the 2020 UCI Europe Tour and the inaugural UCI ProSeries.

== Teams ==
Twenty-five teams, consisting of eight UCI WorldTeams, eight UCI ProTeams, eight UCI Continental teams, and one national team, participated in the race. Each team entered six riders, except for Circus–Wanty Gobert, Giotti Victoria, and Rally Cycling, which each entered five. 68 of the 147 riders that participated in the race finished.

UCI WorldTeams

- Astana
- Bahrain–McLaren
- Bora–Hansgrohe
- Deceuninck–Quick-Step
- NTT Pro Cycling
- Team Ineos
- Trek–Segafredo
- UAE Team Emirates

UCI Professional Continental Teams

- Alpecin–Fenix
- Androni Giocattoli–Sidermec
- Bardiani–CSF–Faizanè
- Bingoal–Wallonie Bruxelles
- Circus–Wanty Gobert
- Gazprom–RusVelo
- Rally Cycling
- Vini Zabù–KTM

UCI Continental Teams

- Beltrami TSA–Marchiol
- Colombia Tierra de Atletas–GW Bicicletas
- D'Amico–UM Tools
- General Store–Essegibi–Fratelli Curia
- Giotti Victoria
- Efapel
- Team Colpack–Ballan
- Work Service–Dinatek–Vega

National Teams

- Italy

== Results ==
Result
Rank	Rider	Team	Time
1	Aleksandr Vlasov (RUS)	Astana	4h 59' 38"
2	João Almeida (POR)	Deceuninck–Quick-Step	+ 9"
3	Diego Ulissi (ITA)	UAE Team Emirates	+ 18"
4	Eddie Dunbar (IRL)	Team Ineos	+ 21"
5	Andrea Bagioli (ITA)	Deceuninck–Quick-Step	+ 24"
6	Jakob Fuglsang (DEN)	Astana	+ 29"
7	Vincenzo Nibali (ITA)	Trek–Segafredo	+ 1' 32"
8	Giulio Ciccone (ITA)	Trek–Segafredo	+ 1' 32"
9	Giovanni Visconti (ITA)	Vini Zabù–KTM	+ 2' 41"
10	Gianluca Brambilla (ITA)	Trek–Segafredo	+ 2' 41"
