= Aleksandr Vlasov (cyclist) =

Russian cyclist (born 1996)

Aleksandr Vlasov Александр Власов
- Vlasov in 2026

Personal information
- Full name: Aleksandr Anatolyevich Vlasov
- Nickname: The Cyborg from Vyborg Sasha
- Born: 23 April 1996 (age 30) Vyborg, Russia
- Height: 186 cm (6 ft 1 in)
- Weight: 68 kg (150 lb)

Cycling career
- Sport: Cycling
- Current team: Red Bull–Bora–Hansgrohe
- Discipline: Road
- Role: Rider
- Rider type: Climber

Amateur team
- 2015–2017: Viris Maserati–Sisal–Matchpoint

Professional teams
- 2018–2019: Gazprom–RusVelo
- 2020–2021: Astana
- 2022–: Bora–Hansgrohe

Major wins
- Stage races Tour de Romandie (2022) Volta a la Comunitat Valenciana (2022) One-day races and Classics National Road Race Championships (2019) National Time Trial Championships (2021) Giro dell'Emilia (2020)

Aleksandr Anatolyevich Vlasov (Russian: Александр Анатольевич Власов; born 23 April 1996) is a Russian professional cyclist who rides for UCI WorldTeam Red Bull–Bora–Hansgrohe.

== Career ==
=== Astana (2020–21) ===
In October 2020, he was named in the startlists for the Giro d'Italia and the Vuelta a España, where he finished 11th overall. In 2021, he finished second in Paris–Nice, and finished just off the podium in the Giro d'Italia.

=== Bora–Hansgrohe ===
In August 2021, Vlasov was announced to be moving to the Bora–Hansgrohe team, signing an initial three-year contract from 2022. Vlasov made his first start with the team at January's Challenge Mallorca, finishing third in the Trofeo Pollença – Port d'Andratx. In his first stage race with the team, the Volta a la Comunitat Valenciana, Vlasov won the third stage which finished on the Alto de las Antenas del Maigmó. He assumed the overall race lead, which he held to the end of the race. He took four further top-five results over the next two months, placing fourth overall at the UAE Tour, second at the GP Miguel Induráin, third overall at the Tour of the Basque Country, and third at La Flèche Wallonne. Following this run of results, Vlasov next competed at the Tour de Romandie, where he was third overall going into the final stage, behind Rohan Dennis and Juan Ayuso. The final stage was a primarily uphill 15.84-kilometre (9.84-mile) individual time trial between the World Cycling Centre in Aigle and the ski resort of Villars-sur-Ollon; Vlasov won the stage by more than half a minute from his next closest challenger Simon Geschke, and with Ayuso and Dennis each losing more than a minute, Vlasov also won the overall general classification.

In preparation for the Tour de France, Vlasov aimed for a 3rd stage race victory of 2022 in the Tour de Suisse, and won the 5th stage to Novazzano, taking the race lead before the first mountain stages. However, Vlasov along with several other riders had to abandon the race the next day after testing positive for Covid 19, hindering his Tour de France preparation.

He went into the 2022 Tour de France, his first Tour entry, with high GC aspirations, but ran into bad luck early in the race. Before the serious mountain stages even started his chances for a high finish took a severe hit. As the race progressed he moved back up in the standings. He made his final jump up to 5th place overall by riding considerably better than Quintana and Meintjes, who were ahead of him to start the day, in the individual time trial on stage 20.

== Major results ==
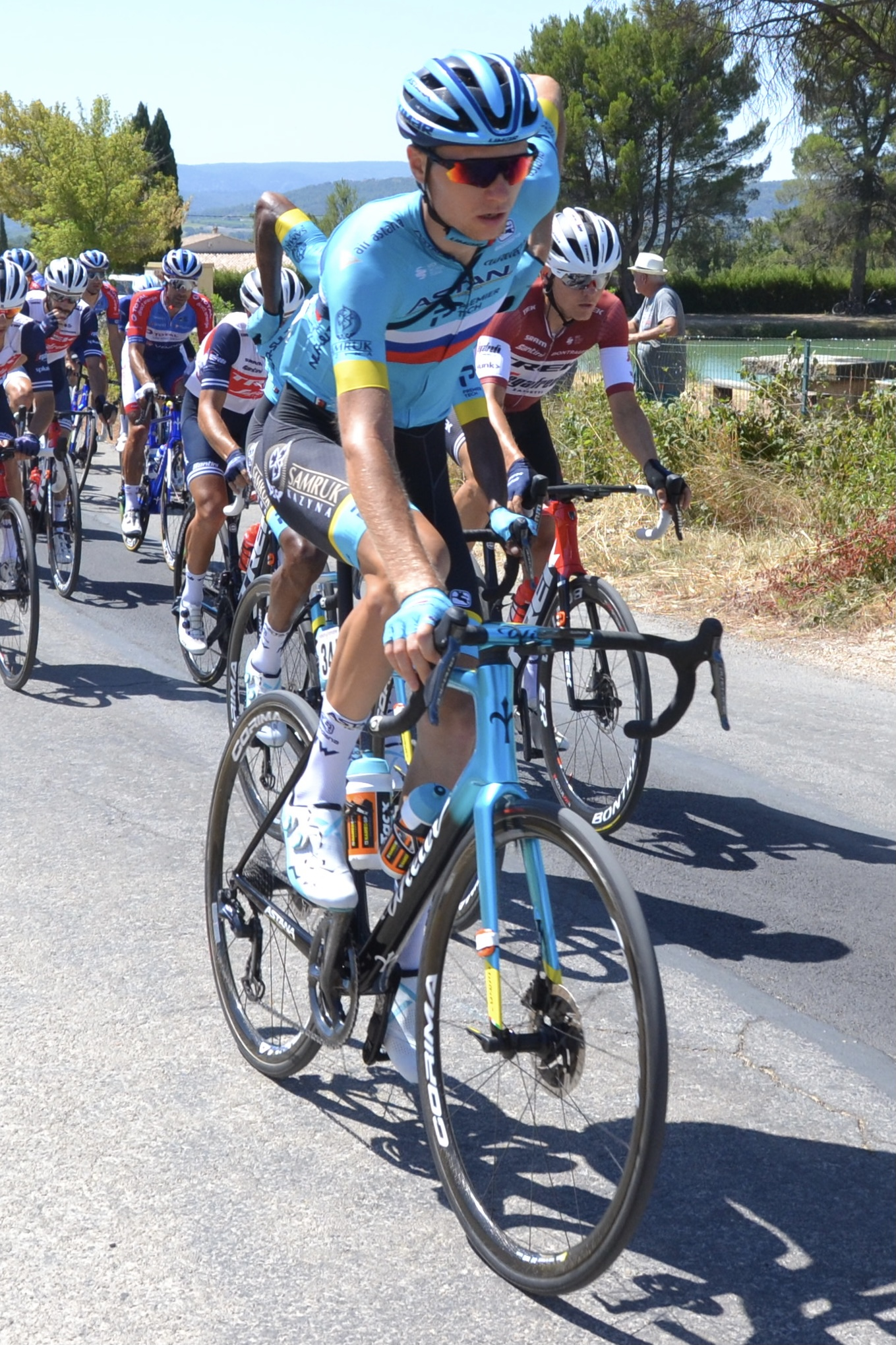
Vlasov, wearing the Russian national road race champion's jersey, at the 2020 Mont Ventoux Dénivelé Challenge. Vlasov would go on to win the race, his first of two one-day race wins in 2020.

2014
1st Overall GP Général Patton

1st Stage 2

6th Overall Trofeo Karlsberg
2015
3rd Coppa della Pace
2016
6th GP Capodarco
9th Giro del Medio Brenta
2017
4th Gran Premio di Poggiana
9th Overall Giro della Valle d'Aosta
9th Piccolo Giro di Lombardia
9th Trofeo Città di San Vendemiano
2018
1st Overall Giro Ciclistico d'Italia
2nd Overall Toscana-Terra di Ciclismo

1st Mountains classification
1st Stage 2

3rd Overall Sibiu Cycling Tour
4th Overall Tour de l'Avenir
6th Giro del Belvedere
2019 (2 pro wins)
1st Road race, National Road Championships
2nd Overall Tour of Almaty
3rd Overall Tour of Slovenia

1st Mountains classification

3rd Overall Vuelta a Asturias
4th Overall Giro di Sicilia
5th Overall Tour of Austria

1st Stage 6

8th Overall Vuelta a Andalucía
8th Overall Settimana Internazionale di Coppi e Bartali
9th Coppa Agostoni
10th Overall Tour of the Alps
2020 (3)
1st Giro dell'Emilia
1st Mont Ventoux Dénivelé Challenge
2nd Overall Tour de la Provence

1st Young rider classification
1st Stage 2

3rd Overall Route d'Occitanie
3rd Giro di Lombardia
4th Gran Piemonte
5th Overall Tirreno–Adriatico

1st Young rider classification

2021 (1)
1st Time trial, National Road Championships
2nd Overall Paris–Nice

1st Young rider classification

3rd Overall Tour of the Alps
4th Overall Giro d'Italia
6th Classic Sud-Ardèche
10th Overall Tour de la Provence
2022 (5)
1st Overall Tour de Romandie

1st Stage 5 (ITT)

1st Overall Volta a la Comunitat Valenciana

1st Stage 3

1st Stage 5 Tour de Suisse
2nd GP Miguel Induráin
3rd Overall Tour of the Basque Country
3rd La Flèche Wallonne
3rd Trofeo Pollença–Port d'Andratx
4th Overall UAE Tour
5th Overall Tour de France
5th Coppa Sabatini
2023
2nd Overall Vuelta a Burgos
3rd Clásica de San Sebastián
3rd Tre Valli Varesine
4th Giro di Lombardia
5th Overall Volta a la Comunitat Valenciana
6th Giro dell'Emilia
7th Overall Vuelta a España
9th Overall Tirreno–Adriatico
2024 (1)
2nd Overall Tour de Romandie
2nd Trofeo Calvià
2nd Trofeo Serra de Tramuntana
3rd Overall Volta a la Comunitat Valenciana
3rd Trofeo Pollença–Port d'Andratx
4th Overall Volta a Catalunya
5th Overall Paris–Nice

1st Stage 7

6th Overall Critérium du Dauphiné
2025
1st Mountains classification, Tour de Suisse
2026
7th Overall Volta a la Comunitat Valenciana
7th Overall Vuelta a Andalucía
9th Overall Tour of the Alps
9th Trofeo Matteotti
10th Overall Tour de Pologne

=== General classification results timeline ===
Grand Tour general classification results
Grand Tour	2018	2019	2020	2021	2022	2023	2024	2025
Giro d'Italia	—	—	DNF	4	—	DNF	—	—
Tour de France	—	—	—	—	5	—	DNF	
Vuelta a España	—	—	11	DNF	—	7	18	
Major stage race general classification results
Race	2018	2019	2020	2021	2022	2023	2024	2025
Paris–Nice	—	—	—	2	DNF	—	5	35
Tirreno–Adriatico	67	—	5	—	—	9	—	—
Volta a Catalunya	—	—	NH	—	—	—	4	—
Tour of the Basque Country	—	—	NH	—	3	—	—	47
Tour de Romandie	—	—	NH	—	1	—	2	24
Critérium du Dauphiné	—	—	—	—	—	—	6	—
Tour de Suisse	—	—	NH	—	DNF	—	—	21

=== Classics results timeline ===
Monument	2018	2019	2020	2021	2022	2023	2024
Milan–San Remo	101	—	—	—	—	—	—
Tour of Flanders	Has not contested during his career						
Paris–Roubaix	Has not contested during his career						
Liège–Bastogne–Liège	—	—	—	—	14	46	20
Giro di Lombardia	—	107	3	39	18	4	45
Classic	2018	2019	2020	2021	2022	2023	2024
Strade Bianche	—	—	—	—	—	26	—
La Flèche Wallonne	—	—	—	—	3	—	DNF
Clásica de San Sebastián	—	—	NH	—	—	3	—
Tre Valli Varesine	—	—	NH	DNF	19	3	NR
Giro dell'Emilia	—	35	1	36	24	6	—
Gran Piemonte	—	22	4	—	—	—	—

Legend
—	Did not compete
DNF	Did not finish
NH	Not held
NR	No result
