= Chambon-sur-Lac =

- Commune
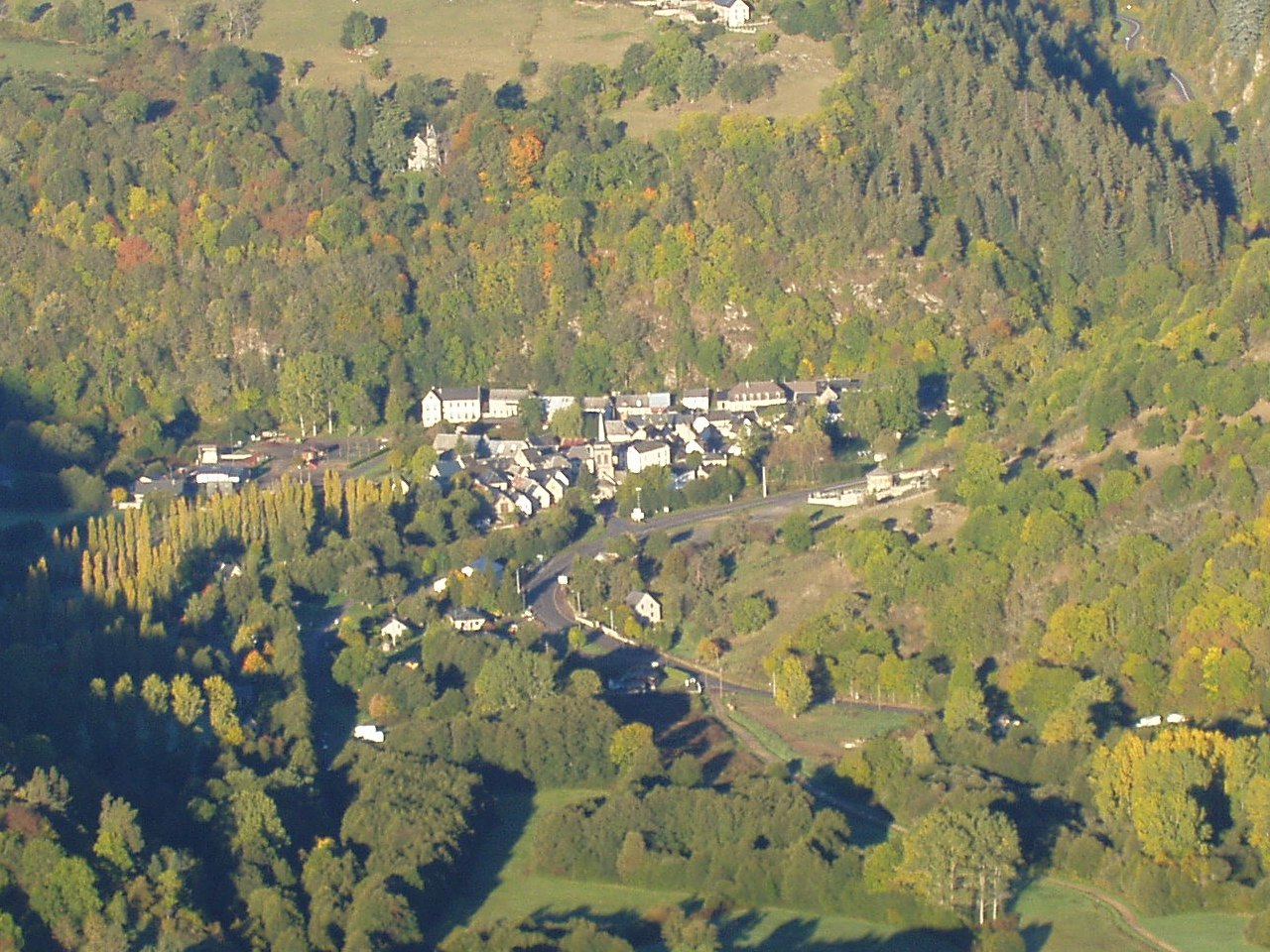
- A general view of Chambon-sur-Lac

- Coat of arms
- Location of Chambon-sur-Lac
- Location within France Location within Auvergne-Rhône-Alpes
- Coordinates: 45°34′20″N 2°53′51″E
- Country: France
- Region: Auvergne-Rhône-Alpes
- Department: Puy-de-Dôme
- Arrondissement: Issoire
- Canton: Le Sancy
- Intercommunality: Massif du Sancy

Government
  - Mayor (2026–32): Emmanuel Labasse
- Area^{1}: 46.93 km^{2} (18.12 sq mi)
- Elevation: 888 m (2,913 ft)
- Highest elevation: 1,883 m (6,178 ft)
- Lowest elevation: 873 m (2,864 ft)
- Population (2023): 407
  - Density: 8.67/km^{2} (22.5/sq mi)
- Time zone: UTC+01:00 (CET)
  - Summer (DST): UTC+02:00 (CEST)
- INSEE/Postal code: 63077 /63790
- ^{1} French Land Register data, which excludes lakes, ponds, glaciers > 1 km^{2} (0.386 sq mi or 247 acres) and river estuaries.

Chambon-sur-Lac (French pronunciation: [ʃɑ̃bɔ̃ syʁ lak]) is a commune in the Puy-de-Dôme department in Auvergne-Rhône-Alpes in central France.

== See also ==
- Communes of the Puy-de-Dôme department
