= Michael Woods (cyclist) =

Canadian cyclist (born 1986)

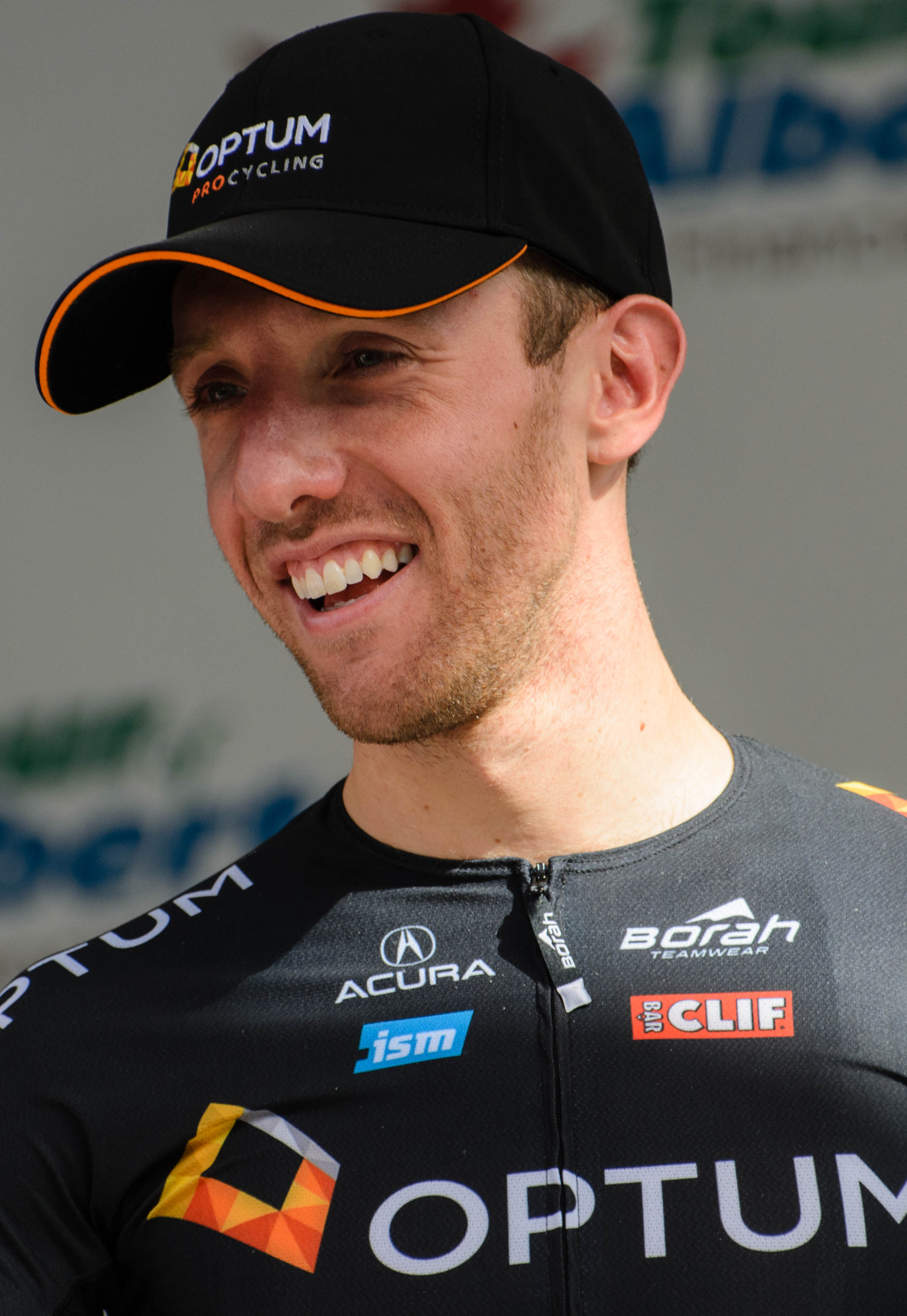
- Woods at the 2015 Tour of Alberta

Personal information
- Full name: Michael Russell Woods
- Nicknames: Woodsy, Rusty
- Born: 12 October 1986 (age 40) East York, Ontario, Canada
- Height: 1.75 m (5 ft 9 in)
- Weight: 64 kg (141 lb)

Cycling career
- Sport: Cycling
- Current team: NSN Cycling Team
- Discipline: Road
- Role: Rider (retired)
- Rider type: Climber

Amateur team
- 2012: Stevens Racing

Professional teams
- 2013: Team Québecor Garneau
- 2014: Amore & Vita–Selle SMP
- 2014: 5-hour Energy
- 2015: Optum–Kelly Benefit Strategies
- 2016–2020: Cannondale
- 2021–2026: Israel Start-Up Nation

Major wins
- Grand Tours Tour de France 1 individual stage (2023) Vuelta a España 3 individual stages (2018, 2020, 2024) One-Day Races and Classics National Road Race Championships (2024) Milano–Torino (2019)
Medal record
Representing Canada
Men's road bicycle racing
World Championships
Bronze medal – third place	2018 Innsbruck	Road race

Michael Russell "Rusty" Woods (born 12 October 1986) is a Canadian professional racing cyclist, who last rode for UCI ProTeam NSN Cycling Team. An accomplished runner as well, Woods was the first person to have both run a sub-four-minute mile and complete the Tour de France.

== Career ==
=== Athletics career ===
Woods' first sport was ice hockey and his childhood ambition was to play as a left wing for the Toronto Maple Leafs. Prior to becoming a cyclist, Woods was a promising middle-distance runner, setting Canadian national junior records in the mile and 3000 metres in 2005, as well as taking the gold medal in the 1500 metres at the 2005 Pan American Junior Athletics Championships. However, he suffered a recurring stress fracture in his left foot, exacerbated by excessive training and racing, resulting in his running his last race in 2007. Woods underwent surgery twice in order to correct the problem without success. He took up cycling initially as cross-training before friends persuaded him to enter races.

Woods attended the University of Michigan on a track athletic scholarship, graduating in 2008. While at Michigan, he was coached by Ron Warhurst.

Personal bests
Outdoor Track

Discipline	Performance	Place	Date	Records	Results Score
800 Metres	1:52.95	Ann Arbor, MI (USA)	05 MAY 2007		944
1500 Metres	3:39.37	Cuxhaven (GER)	07 JUL 2006		1115
One Mile	3:57.48	Windsor (CAN)	28 JUL 2005		1106
3000 Metres	7:58.04	Ottawa (CAN)	29 JUN 2005	NU20R	1067
5000 Metres	14:14.18	University Park, PA (USA)	13 MAY 2007		953

Indoor Track

Discipline	Performance	Place	Date	Records	Results Score
800 Metres	1:51.22	University Park, PA (USA)	11 FEB 2006		1045
1500 Metres	3:55.71	Montréal (CAN)	24 JAN 2004		948
One Mile	3:57.87	Boston, MA (USA)	28 JAN 2006		1157
3000 Metres	7:58.55	Ann Arbor, MI (USA)	21 JAN 2006		1087
3000 Metres	7:52.27 *	South Bend, IN (USA)	04 FEB 2006		0

Legend = * Not legal.

=== Cycling career ===
Woods began cycling professionally with Team Québecor Garneau in 2013.

On 20 August 2015 it was announced that Woods would join Cannondale for the 2016 cycling season.

In 2016, Woods was officially named in Canada's 2016 Olympic team. Woods was also named in the start list for the 2017 Giro d'Italia. He finished the 2017 Giro, his first grand tour, in 38th place, taking two fifth-place stage finishes along the way and helping teammate Pierre Rolland to win a stage. Woods was later named in the start list for the 2017 Vuelta a España where he finished his second Grand Tour in 7th place, taking one third-place finish and five top-tens.

In 2018, Woods scored what he described as "the best result of my career" by finishing second in the Liège–Bastogne–Liège race. In September 2018, Woods won Stage 17 of the Vuelta a España, which finished up a steep climb to Balcón de Bizkaia. On 30 September, Woods finished third in the road race at the UCI Road World Championships in Innsbruck, Austria. It was the first medal for Canada at the World Championships since Svein Tuft's silver medal in the time trial in 2008, and their first medal in the road race since Steve Bauer's bronze-medal performance in 1984.

In July 2019, he was named in the startlist for the 2019 Tour de France. In October 2019 he won the oldest classic race, the 100th edition of Milano–Torino. In August 2020, it was announced that Woods was to join Israel Start-Up Nation from the 2021 season, on a three-year contract. He represented Canada at the 2020 Summer Olympics and finished in fifth place in the men's individual road race.

In 2023, Woods won stage 9 of the Tour de France with a climb on the Puy de Dôme, making up over 1 minute in the last few kilometres to win the race.

In 2024, Woods was inducted in the Chelsea Wall of Fame alongside martial artist Dave Leduc and runner Ray Zahab, in a permanent display at the Meredith Centre in Chelsea, Quebec.

In 2025, Woods announced that he would retire at the end of the season.

== Major results ==
2013
9th Overall Tour de Beauce
2014
4th Road race, National Road Championships
6th Overall Tour de Beauce
2015 (1 pro win)
1st Clássica Loulé
2nd Overall Tour of Utah

1st Stage 5

2nd Philadelphia International Cycling Classic
4th Overall Tour of the Gila

1st Stage 5

10th Overall Tour of Alberta

1st Canadian rider classification

2016
2nd Milano–Torino
5th Overall Tour Down Under
2017
2nd GP Miguel Induráin
7th Overall Vuelta a España
9th Liège–Bastogne–Liège
2018 (1)
1st Stage 17 Vuelta a España
2nd Liège–Bastogne–Liège
3rd Road race, UCI Road World Championships
4th Giro dell'Emilia
4th Tre Valli Varesine
9th Overall Tour of Utah
2019 (2)
1st Milano–Torino
2nd Giro dell'Emilia
2nd Japan Cup
3rd Overall Herald Sun Tour

1st Stage 2

5th Giro di Lombardia
5th Liège–Bastogne–Liège
6th Overall Volta a Catalunya
7th Overall Tour Down Under
8th Grand Prix Cycliste de Montréal
9th Clásica de San Sebastián
10th Overall Tour de Romandie
2020 (2)
1st Stage 7 Vuelta a España
3rd La Flèche Wallonne
7th Liège–Bastogne–Liège
8th Overall Tirreno–Adriatico

1st Stage 3

2021 (2)
2nd Overall Tour des Alpes-Maritimes et du Var

1st Stage 2

3rd Giro dell'Emilia
4th La Flèche Wallonne
5th Road race, Olympic Games
5th Overall Tour de Romandie

1st Stage 4

5th Overall Tour de Suisse

1st Mountains classification

5th Overall Tour of Britain
5th Liège–Bastogne–Liège
5th Milano–Torino
9th Giro di Lombardia
Tour de France

Held after Stage 14

2022 (3)
1st Overall Route d'Occitanie

1st Stage 3

2nd Overall O Gran Camiño

1st Stage 2

2nd Mercan'Tour Classic
6th La Flèche Wallonne
10th Liège–Bastogne–Liège
2023 (3)
1st Overall Route d'Occitanie

1st Stage 3

1st Stage 9 Tour de France
2nd Mont Ventoux Dénivelé Challenge
4th La Flèche Wallonne
5th Giro dell'Emilia
6th Overall Volta a Catalunya
7th Tre Valli Varesine
2024 (2)
1st Road race, National Road Championships
1st Stage 13 Vuelta a España
4th Giro dell'Emilia
4th Classic Var
4th Japan Cup
8th Clásica de San Sebastián
8th Grand Prix Cycliste de Montréal
10th Overall Tour des Alpes-Maritimes
2025
10th Overall Tour Down Under

=== General classification results timeline ===
Grand Tour general classification results
Grand Tour	2016	2017	2018	2019	2020	2021	2022	2023	2024	2025
Giro d'Italia	—	38	19	—	—	—	—	—	DNF	—
Tour de France	—	—	—	32	—	DNF	DNF	48	—	52
Vuelta a España	—	7	34	—	34	—	DNF	—	DNF	—
Major stage race general classification results
Race	2016	2017	2018	2019	2020	2021	2022	2023	2024	2025
Paris–Nice	—	54	—	—	DNF	—	—	—	—	—
Tirreno–Adriatico	—	—	—	—	8	—	—	20	—	—
Volta a Catalunya	18	37	79	6	NH	11	DNF	6	62	—
Tour of the Basque Country	53	12	29	—	NH	DNF	13	—	—	—
Tour de Romandie	—	—	—	10	NH	5	17	DNF	—	—
Critérium du Dauphiné	—	—	—	DNF	—	—	—	—	—	—
Tour de Suisse	—	26	—	—	NH	5	—	—	—	DNF

=== Classics results timeline ===
Monument	2016	2017	2018	2019	2020	2021	2022	2023	2024	2025
Milan–San Remo	—	—	—	—	65	—	—	—	—	—
Tour of Flanders	Did not contest during his career									
Paris–Roubaix	Did not contest during his career									
Liège–Bastogne–Liège	—	9	2	5	7	5	10	12	—	—
Giro di Lombardia	31	—	13	5	29	9	DNF	12	DNF	—
Classic	2016	2017	2018	2019	2020	2021	2022	2023	2024	2025
Amstel Gold Race	—	—	20	68	NH	32	—	DNF	—	—
La Flèche Wallonne	12	11	33	55	3	4	6	4	—	—
Clásica de San Sebastián	61	—	—	9	NH	—	—	—	8	—
Grand Prix Cycliste de Québec	27	—	—	17	Not held		—	49	—	—
Grand Prix Cycliste de Montréal	30	—	—	8	Not held		—	15	8	—
Milano–Torino	2	—	—	1	—	5	—	—	—	DNF
Giro dell'Emilia	19	—	4	2	—	3	DNF	5	4	—
Tre Valli Varesine	40	—	4	DNF	—	—	DNF	7	—	—

Legend
—	Did not compete
DNF	Did not finish
IP	In progress
NH	Not held
