= Andrea Bagioli =

Italian cyclist (born 1999)

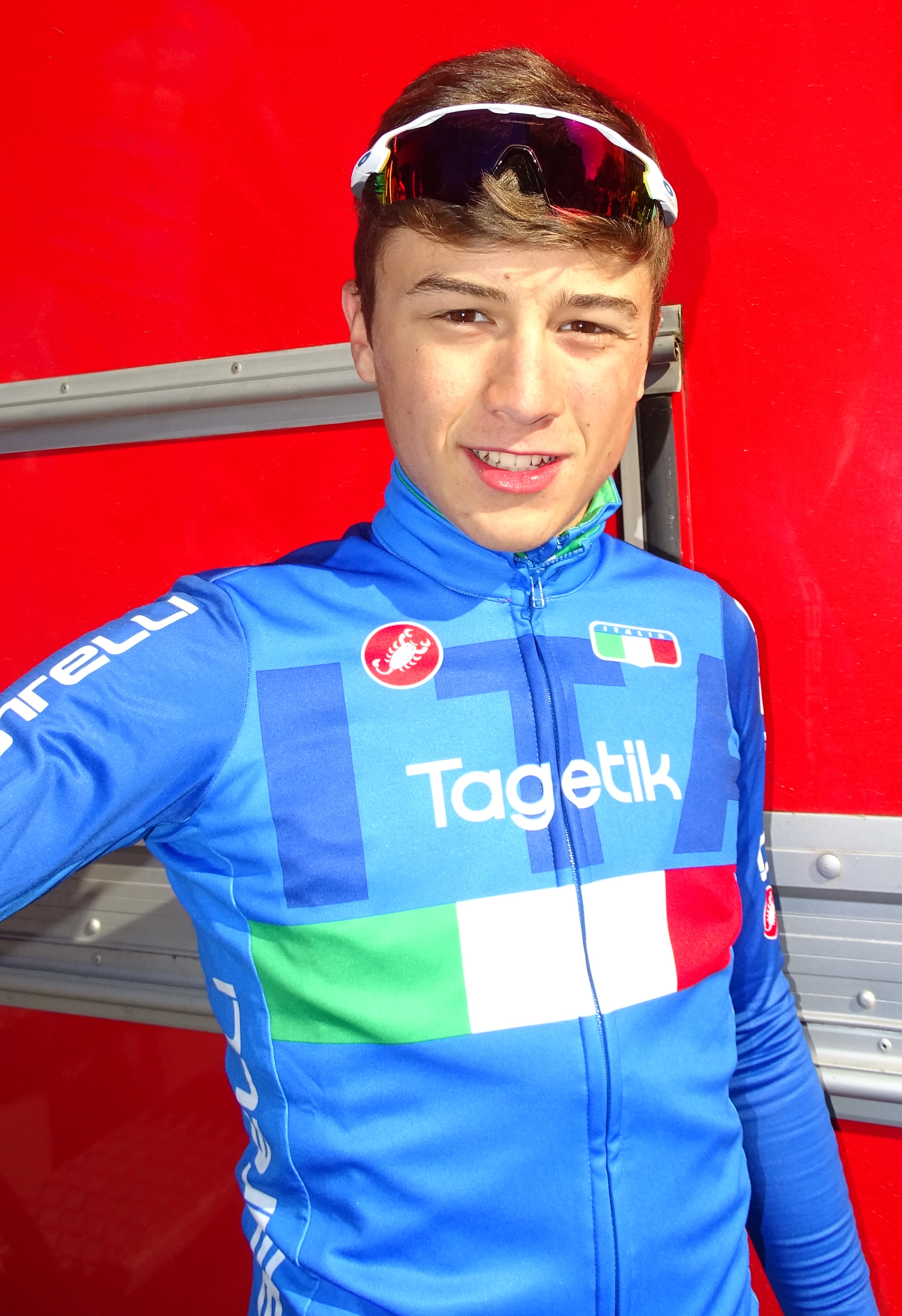
- Bagioli in 2016

Personal information
- Born: 23 March 1999 (age 27) Aosta, Italy

Cycling career
- Sport: Cycling
- Current team: Lidl–Trek
- Discipline: Road
- Role: Rider
- Rider type: Puncheur

Amateur teams
- 2018: Team Colpack
- 2018: UAE Team Emirates (stagiaire)

Professional teams
- 2019: Team Colpack
- 2020–2023: Deceuninck–Quick-Step
- 2024–: Lidl–Trek

Major wins
- One-day races and Classics Gran Piemonte (2023) La Drôme Classic (2021)

Andrea Bagioli (born 23 March 1999) is an Italian cyclist, who currently rides for UCI WorldTeam Lidl–Trek. He is the younger brother of Nicola Bagioli, who is also a cyclist. He rode in the 2020 Vuelta a España, and also in the 2021 Vuelta a Espana.

== Major results ==
2016
1st Trofeo Citta di Loano
6th Overall Grand Prix Rüebliland
2017
3rd Overall Course de la Paix Juniors
4th Gran Premio dell'Arno
5th Overall Giro della Lunigiana
7th Trofeo Buffoni
9th Trofeo Citta di Loano
2018
1st Overall Toscana-Terra di Ciclismo

1st Points classification
1st Young rider classification
1st Stage 3

2nd Piccolo Giro di Lombardia
2nd Liège–Bastogne–Liège Espoirs
3rd G.P. Palio del Recioto
5th Giro del Medio Brenta
2019
1st Overall Ronde de l'Isard

1st Young rider classification
1st Stages 2 & 3

1st Piccolo Giro di Lombardia
1st Trofeo Città di San Vendemiano
1st Stage 5 Giro della Valle d'Aosta
2020 (2 pro wins)
1st Stage 1 Tour de l'Ain
2nd Overall Settimana Internazionale di Coppi e Bartali

1st Stages 1b (TTT) & 2

5th Giro dell'Emilia
7th Brabantse Pijl
10th Ardèche Classic
2021 (1)
1st La Drôme Classic
4th Overall Tour de l'Ain

1st Young rider classification

Vuelta a España

Held after Stages 1 & 2

2022 (1)
1st Stage 7 Volta a Catalunya
3rd Grand Prix Cycliste de Montréal
8th Gran Piemonte
2023 (3)
1st Gran Piemonte
1st Stage 3 Okolo Slovenska
1st Stage 5 Tour de Wallonie
2nd Giro di Lombardia
3rd La Drôme Classic
3rd Coppa Bernocchi
6th Amstel Gold Race
8th Brabantse Pijl
9th Clásica de San Sebastián
10th Trofeo Calvia
2025
3rd GP Miguel Induráin
5th Cadel Evans Great Ocean Road Race
5th La Drôme Classic
6th Liège–Bastogne–Liège
10th Gran Piemonte
10th GP Gippingen
2026 (1)
1st Stage 4 Tour of Austria
5th GP Miguel Induráin

=== Grand Tour general classification results timeline ===
Grand Tour	2020	2021	2022	2023	2024	2025
Giro d'Italia	—	—	—	—	65	—
Tour de France	—	—	97	—	—	—
Vuelta a España	DNF	90	—	DNF	—	38

=== Classics results timeline ===
Monument	2020	2021	2022	2023	2024	2025
Milan–San Remo	—	—	60	—	—	119
Tour of Flanders	—	—	—	—	—	—
Paris–Roubaix	NH	—	—	—	—	—
Liège–Bastogne–Liège	DNF	—	—	DNF	DNF	6
Giro di Lombardia	DNF	70	DNF	2	—	
Classic	2020	2021	2022	2023	2024	2025
Strade Bianche	—	—	—	30	82	DNF
Brabantse Pijl	7	—	DNF	8	—	—
Amstel Gold Race	—	—	38	6	75	36
La Flèche Wallonne	19	—	—	38	DNF	101
Clásica de San Sebastián	NH	—	—	9	—	—
Grand Prix Cycliste de Québec	Not held		22	—	25	—
Grand Prix Cycliste de Montréal	Not held		3	—	14	—
Giro dell'Emilia	5	31	—	21	DNF	36
Gran Piemonte	—	—	8	1	—	10

Legend
—	Did not compete
DNF	Did not finish
