= Primož Roglič =

Slovenian racing cyclist (born 1989)

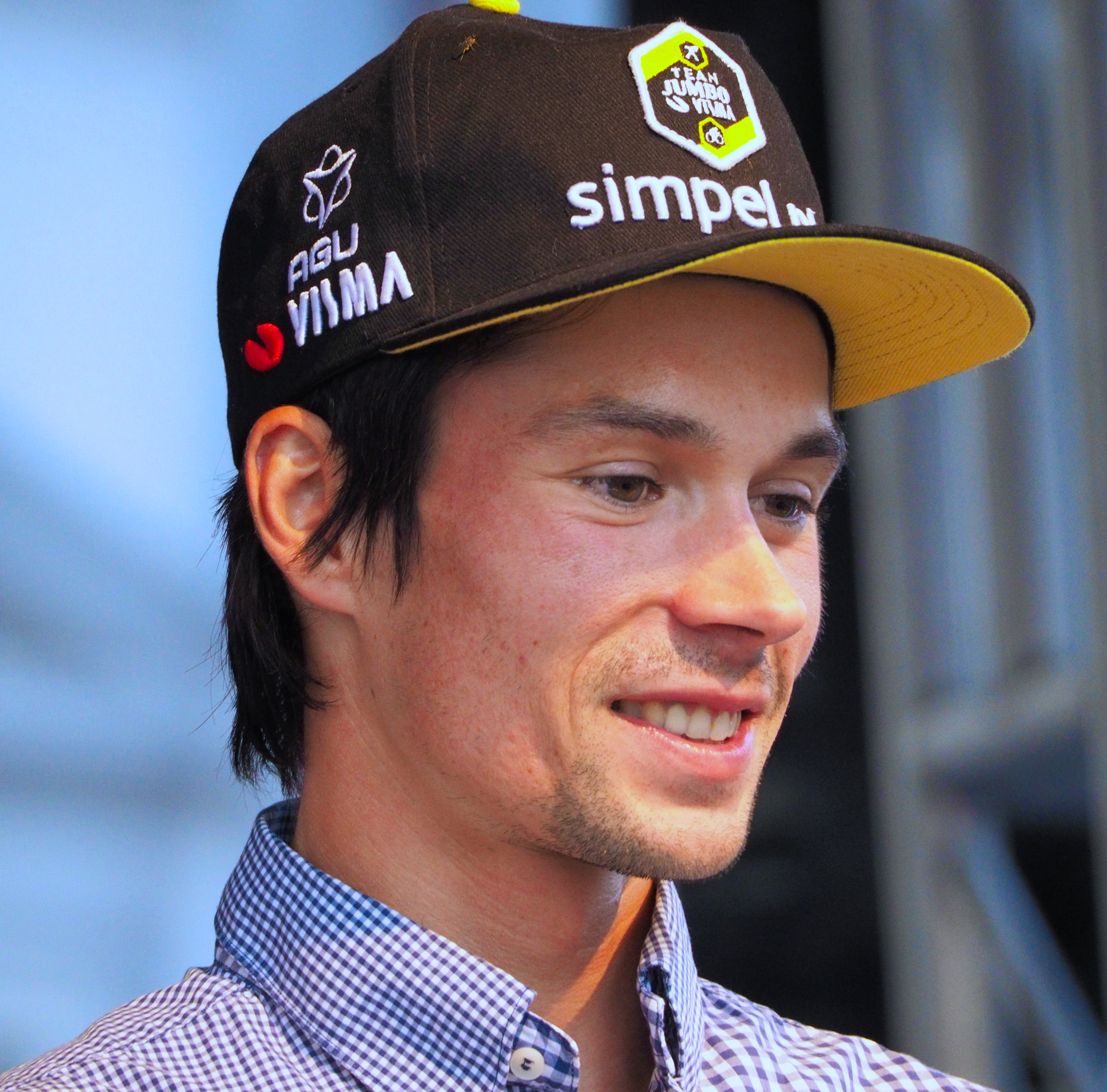
- Roglič in 2019

Personal information
- Full name: Primož Roglič
- Nickname: Rogla (Note: The abbreviation of his surname has been used by media organizations, the UCI, and by Roglič himself on Twitter. The nickname coincides with the name of a popular Slovenian mountain peak and ski resort.)
- Born: 29 October 1989 (age 37) Trbovlje, SR Slovenia, Yugoslavia
- Height: 1.77 m (5 ft 9 1/2 in)
- Weight: 65 kg (143 lb; 10 st 3 lb)

Cycling career
- Sport: Cycling
- Current team: Red Bull–Bora–Hansgrohe
- Discipline: Road
- Role: Rider
- Rider type: All-rounder

Professional teams
- 2013–2015: Adria Mobil
- 2016–2023: LottoNL–Jumbo
- 2024–: Bora–Hansgrohe

Major wins
- Grand Tours Tour de France 3 individual stages (2017, 2018, 2020) Giro d'Italia General classification (2023) 4 individual stages (2016, 2019, 2023) Vuelta a España General classification (2019, 2020, 2021, 2024) Points classification (2019, 2020) 15 individual stages (2019–2024) 1 TTT stage (2022) Stage races Critérium du Dauphiné (2022, 2024) Tirreno–Adriatico (2019, 2023) Tour of the Basque Country (2018, 2021) Tour de Romandie (2018, 2019) Volta a Catalunya (2023, 2025) Paris–Nice (2022) UAE Tour (2019) Volta ao Algarve (2017) Vuelta a Burgos (2023) One-day races and Classics Olympic Games Time Trial (2020) European Time Trial Championships (2026) National Road Race Championships (2020) National Time Trial Championships (2016, 2026) Liège–Bastogne–Liège (2020) Giro dell'Emilia (2019, 2021, 2023) Milano–Torino (2021) Tre Valli Varesine (2019) Other UCI World Ranking (2019, 2020) UCI Europe Tour (2019, 2020) Vélo d'Or (2020)
Medal record
Men's road bicycle racing
Representing Slovenia
Olympic Games
| Gold medal – first place | 2020 Tokyo | Time trial |
World Championships
| Silver medal – second place | 2017 Bergen | Time trial |
European Championships
| Gold medal – first place | 2026 Ljubljana | Time trial |
Men's ski jumping
Representing Slovenia
Junior World Championships
| Gold medal – first place | 2007 Planica | Team normal hill |
| Silver medal – second place | 2006 Kranj | Team normal hill |

Primož Roglič (Slovene pronunciation: [ˈpɾiːmɔʃ ˈɾɔːɡlitʃ]; born 29 October 1989) is a Slovenian professional racing cyclist who rides for UCI WorldTeam Red Bull–Bora–Hansgrohe. A former ski jumper, Roglič switched to cycling after an accident suffered at Planica. Despite becoming a professional at the relatively late age of 23, Roglič has since become one of the most successful cyclists of his generation, with many notable wins in time trials, one-week stage races, and Grand Tours.

Roglič has won five Grand Tours, including the Vuelta a España a record-tying four times (2019, 2020, 2021, and 2024), and the Giro d'Italia in 2023. He was the first Slovenian to win either race. Roglič has also finished second overall at the 2020 Tour de France, becoming the first Slovenian to wear the yellow jersey before losing out to compatriot Tadej Pogačar.

In 2020, when Roglič won the cycling monument Liège–Bastogne–Liège in addition to his Grand Tour success, he won the Vélo d'Or, which is awarded to the most successful cyclist of the racing season. In 2021, he won an Olympic gold medal in the men's individual time trial, Slovenia's first cycling medal.

Between 2019 and 2021, Roglič held the No. 1 ranking in the UCI Men's road racing world ranking for 75 weeks (a former record) and has twice finished as the year-end No. 1.

== Career ==
=== Ski jumping ===
Born in Trbovlje, Slovenia, Roglič pursued ski jumping from the age of 10, practicing at a local jump in Zagorje ob Savi, 3 km from his childhood home. In 2003, at age 13, Roglič participated in his first FIS competition in Villach, Austria.

In 2006, Roglič earned a place on the Slovenian team for the 2006 FIS Nordic Junior World Ski Championships, where they won silver. The next year, competing in Planica, Slovenia, Roglič won gold in the team event.

In 2007, Roglič suffered a crash as a test jumper during official training in front of his home crowd at Letalnica bratov Gorišek, the ski flying hill in Planica, Slovenia. Despite being airlifted to the hospital, Roglič was not significantly injured and continued to compete. Roglič would continue to compete until early 2011, but his progression as a ski jumper had largely stalled, and he did not achieve any other major victories and was not selected to the Olympic team. Roglič finished his career with a personal best of 185 metres (607 feet), set in Planica, and two Continental Cup victories, the second-highest level of international ski jumping.

=== Transition to road cycling ===
I felt it was time for a change. I liked cycling and thought, 'Why not? I will try to become professional.'

— Primož Roglič, on his 2012 decision to switch to cycling, in a VeloNews interview

After officially retiring from ski jumping in 2012, as he felt unable to reach the high levels of the sport, Roglič explored other sports including duathlon and triathlon. During this period, he was enrolled at the University of Kranj studying organization and management, and worked various jobs including selling cleaning products door-to-door.

Roglič began participating in local amateur cycling races, and despite limited experience—Roglič later estimated he had only ridden 2,000 km (1,200 mi) in his life up to that point—decided to pursue the sport professionally. Inspired by a meeting with former professional cyclist Andrej Hauptman, now a directeur sportif at UAE Team Emirates, Roglič sold his motorcycle, bought a racing bicycle, and began riding with the development team affiliated with the UCI Continental team Radenska.

While he initially lacked bike handling skills and knowledge of racing, Roglič showed immediate promise as a climber. At the age of 22, Roglič underwent testing at a sports lab, where his VO_{2} max was recorded at 80.2, close to the best numbers of riders such as Chris Froome and Egan Bernal. Roglič has credited the work he undertook on building core stability, balance, flexibility and acrobatics as a ski jumper as being beneficial in his switch to cycling.

=== Adria Mobil (2013–2015) ===
After less than a year of focused training for cycling, Roglič signed his first professional contract for the 2013 season with the continental Adria Mobil team. His best result in 2013 was 15th place overall at the Tour of Slovenia. He took his first professional win the following year, taking a mountainous stage of the Tour d'Azerbaïdjan by winning a two-up sprint against Will Clarke. After three seasons with the team – culminating in a successful 2015 season, including wins at the Tour de Slovenia and the Tour d'Azerbaïdjan – he signed a contract to ride with LottoNL–Jumbo for the 2016 season.

=== LottoNL–Jumbo (2016–2023) ===
==== 2016 - Grand Tour debut ====
During his first year at the World Tour level, Roglič immediately showed his talent when placing 5th overall at the Volta ao Algarve. Just one month later Roglič finished 2nd on stage 7 at the Volta a Catalunya, when he lost the sprint to Alexey Tsatevich. Roglič started in the Giro d'Italia, where he surprised with a second place in the opening time trial in Apeldoorn, a hundredth of a second slower than winner Tom Dumoulin. He won the 9th stage, a 40.5-kilometre (25.2-mile) individual time trial in Chianti. That victory came as a surprise for many as Roglič had to use his spare bike because his bike did not meet the UCI requirements. Roglič did not manage to transfer his cycle computer onto his spare bike in time for the start, and it was therefore hard for Roglič to know how much time he had left of the stage, and what his power numbers were. Just two weeks after finishing the Giro d'Italia, Roglič won the Slovenian National Time Trial Championships. He finished 10th in the Time trial at the Olympic Games in Rio de Janeiro.

==== 2017 - first Tour de France stage win ====
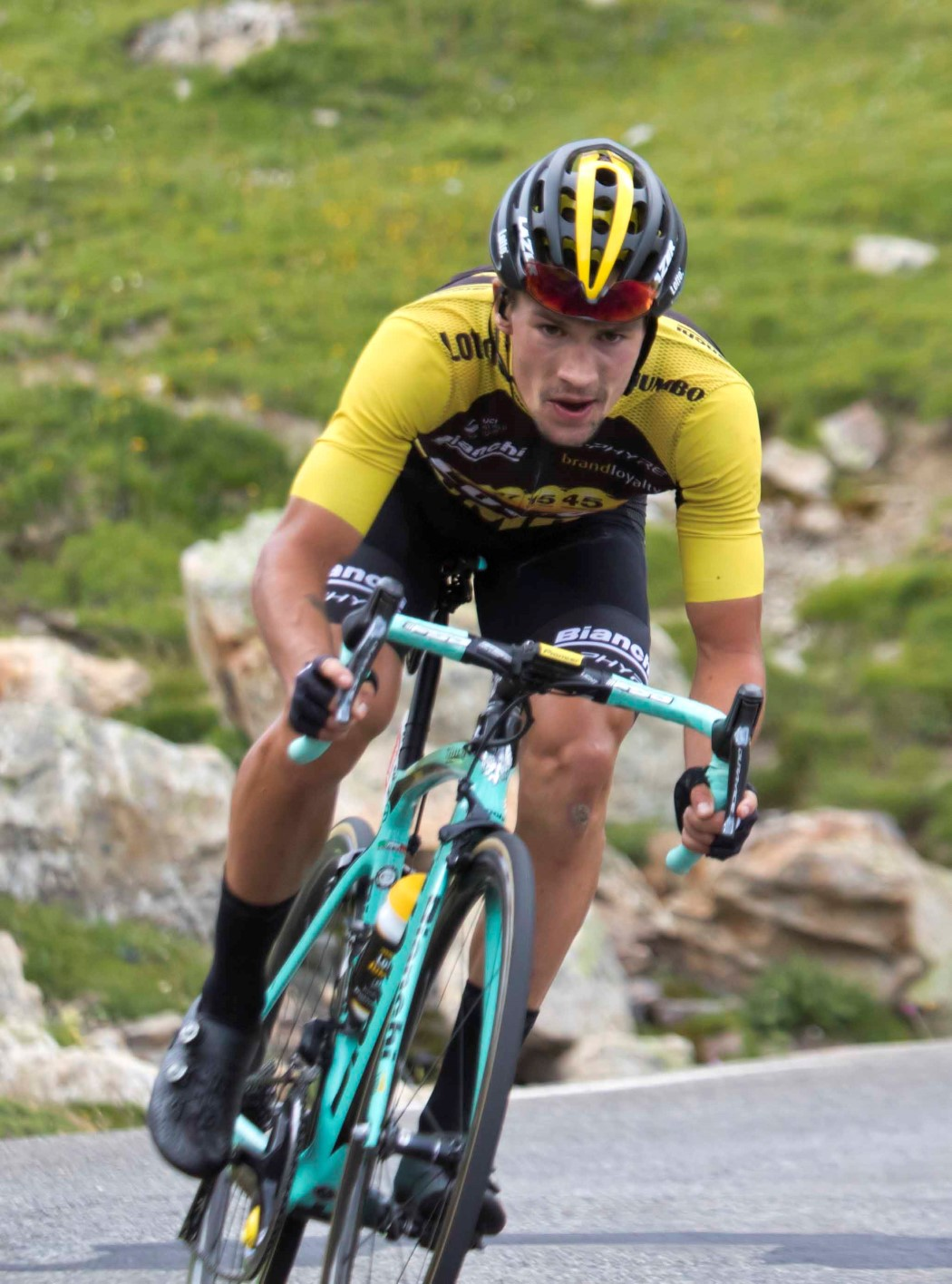
Roglič on his way to winning stage 17 of the 2017 Tour de France.

During the 2017 season, Roglič started out by winning the overall title at the Volta ao Algarve. One month later he finished 4th overall in Tirreno–Adriatico, and at the Tour of the Basque Country, Roglič won stages 4 and 6 – the latter of which was an individual time trial – and finished 5th overall. It did not take long before Roglič secured another win; at the end of April, Roglič participated in the Tour de Romandie where he won the stage 5 individual time trial, en route to placing 3rd overall. At his final preparation race before the Tour de France, Roglič won the prologue of the Ster ZLM Toer, and finished 2nd overall.

In June 2017, Roglič was named in the startlist for the Tour de France. He won stage 17 of the race becoming the first Slovenian to win a stage of the Tour de France. He had also collected so many points on the climbs that he finished 2nd in the Mountains classification. At the World Championships in Bergen, Roglič targeted the individual time trial, which finished on Mount Floyen, a 3-kilometre (1.9-mile) climb averaging 9%. He finished 2nd in the event behind Tom Dumoulin.

==== 2018 - stage race success ====
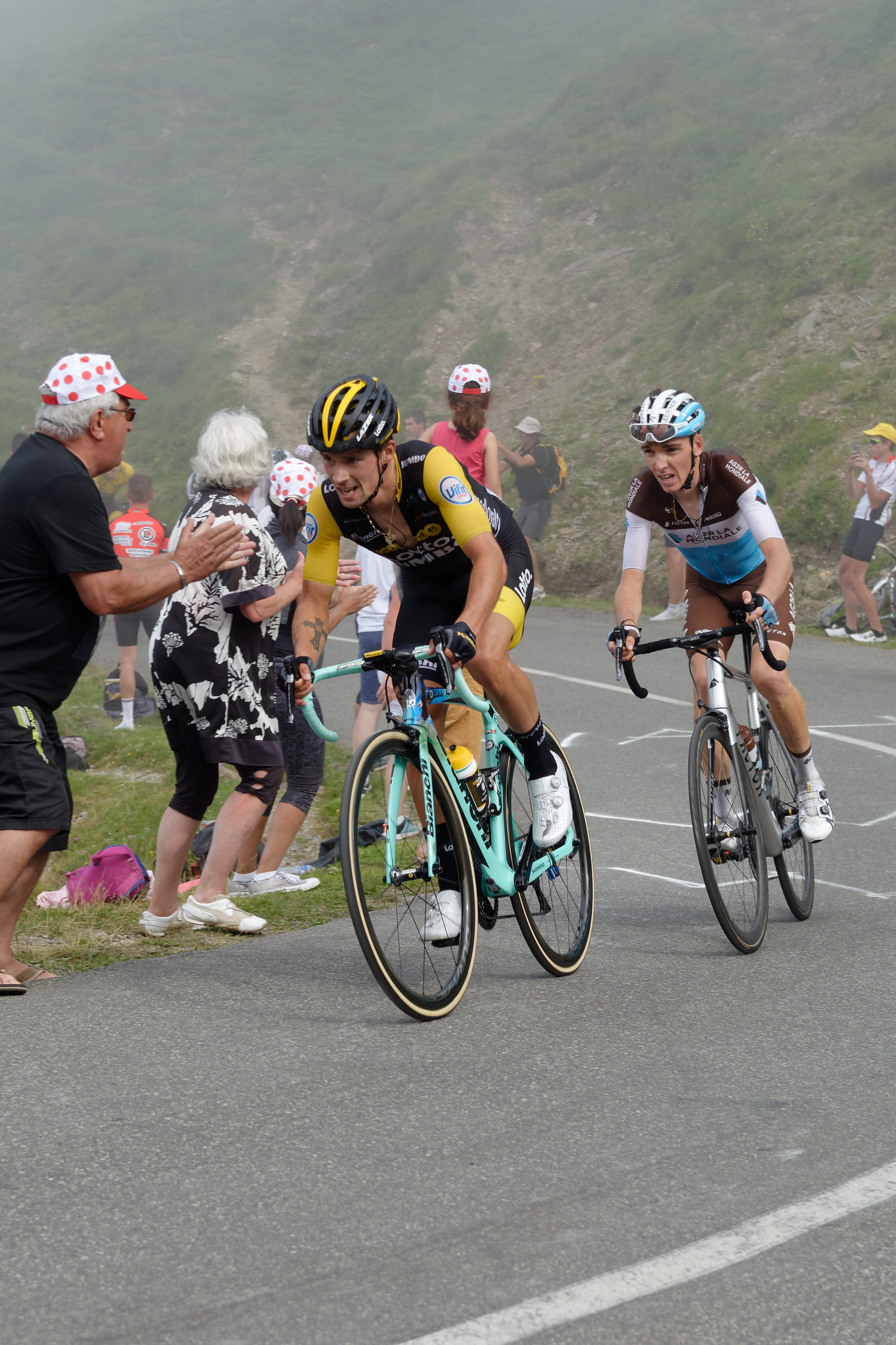
Roglič (left) on stage 19 of the 2018 Tour de France

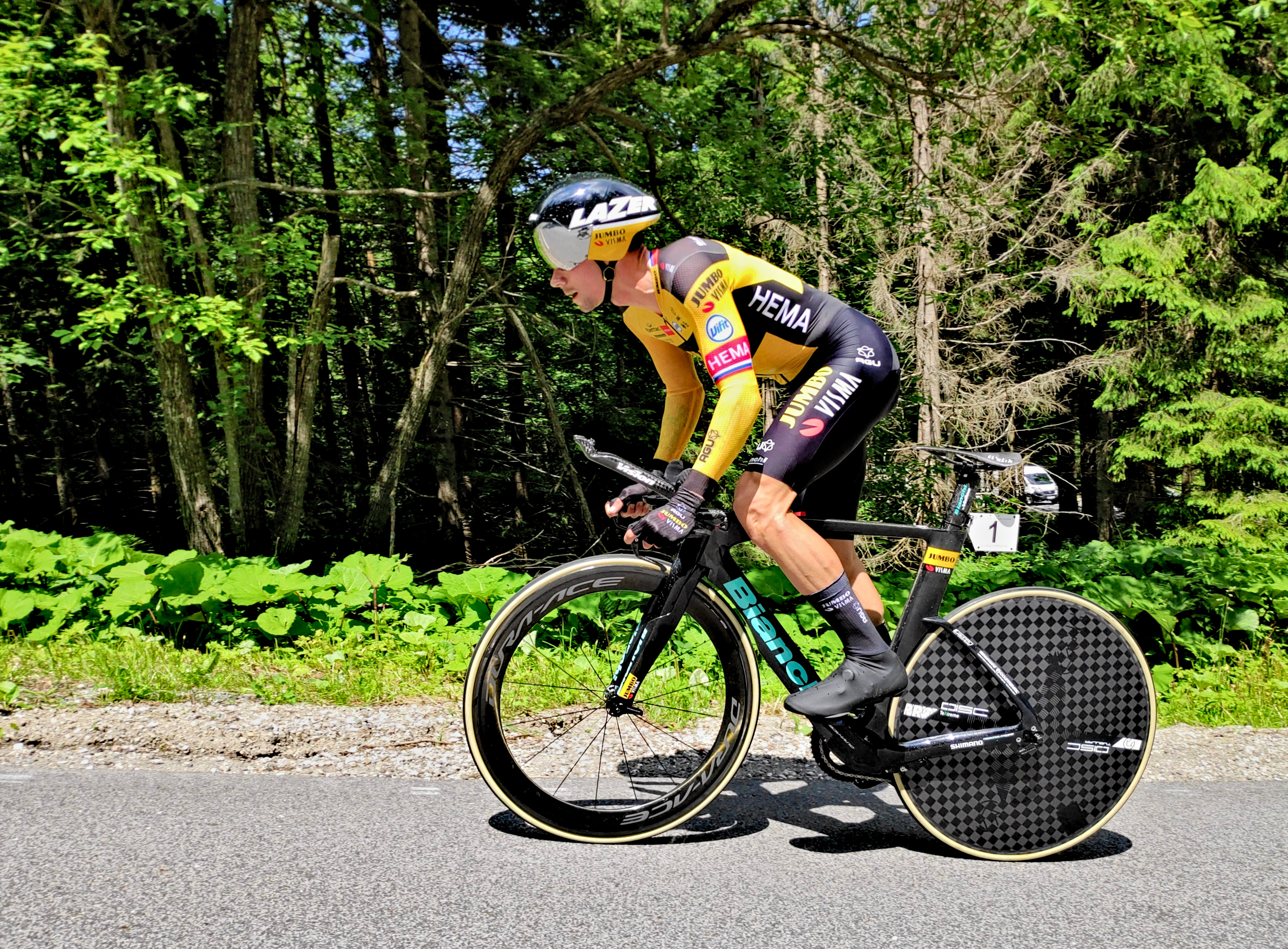
Roglič finished second at the 2020 Slovenian National Time Trial Championships in Pokljuka, 8.5 seconds behind UAE Team Emirates rider Tadej Pogačar.

The 2018 season showed Roglič's potential in stage races and grand tours. He managed to win the general classification in the Tour of the Basque Country, the Tour de Romandie and the Tour of Slovenia. During the early stages of the Tour de France, Roglič managed to avoid the crashes and mechanical issues that many other general classification riders fell victim to putting him in position to compete with the elite riders including Geraint Thomas, Tom Dumoulin, Chris Froome, Nairo Quintana, Romain Bardet and Mikel Landa among others. Roglič was able to stay with the elite riders through the high mountains answering nearly every attack to the point that, after he attacked on the descent and won stage 19 of the race, he was in a podium position in third place overall, behind only Thomas and Dumoulin. Roglič finished the 2018 Tour in fourth overall, after Froome was able to regain the final podium position in the final time trial.

==== 2019 - first Vuelta win ====
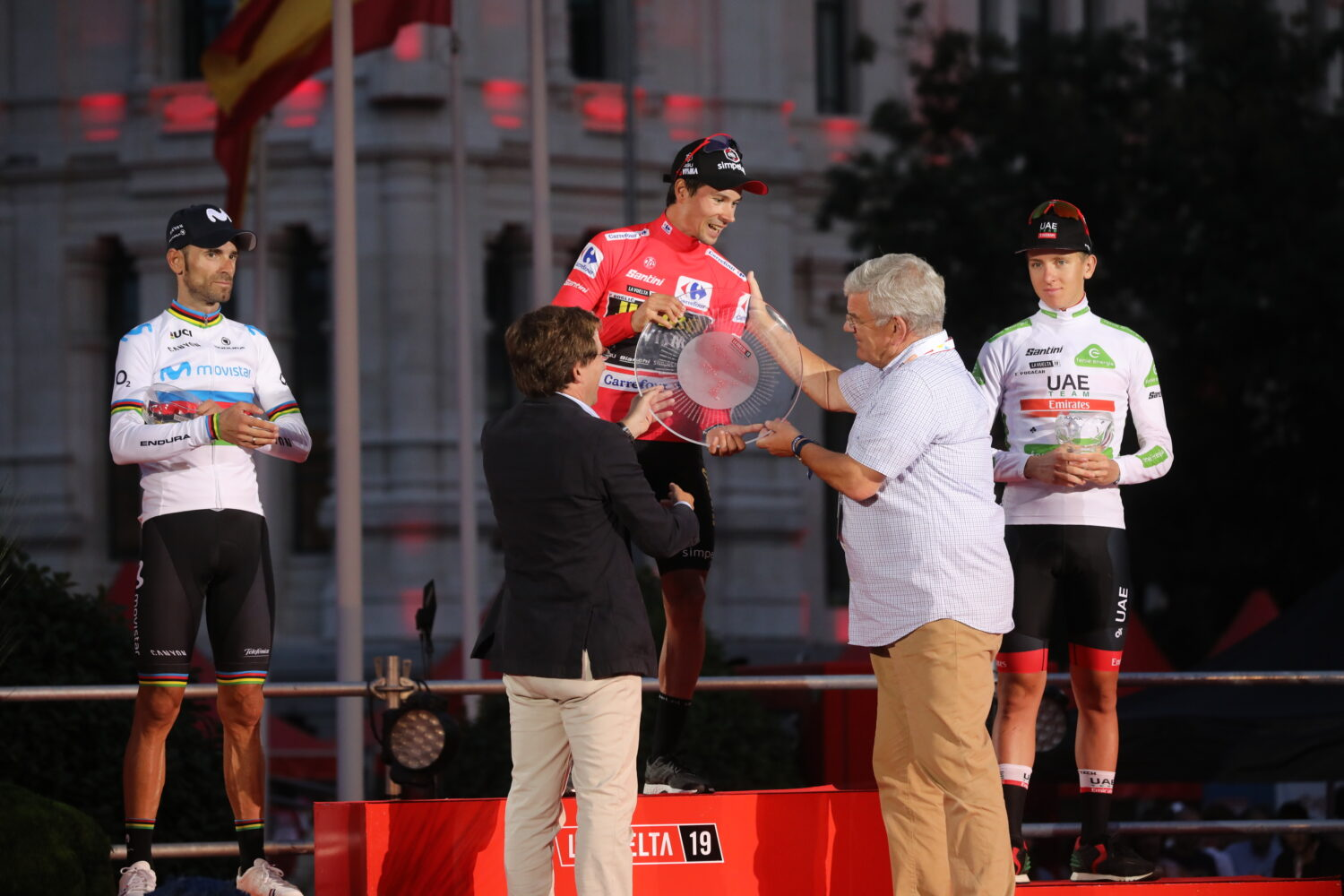
Roglič (centre) won the 2019 Vuelta a España, becoming the first Slovenian rider to win a Grand Tour.

Roglič won the 2019 edition of Tirreno–Adriatico as well as the Tour de Romandie and was one of the pre-race favourites going into the Giro d'Italia. He finished on the podium in 3rd place, wore the race leader's pink jersey for six stages and also won two stages, both individual time trials. In August 2019, Roglič was named in the startlist for the Vuelta a España. Going into the stage ten individual time trial, Roglič trailed the race leader Nairo Quintana by six seconds; Roglič recorded the fastest time over the 36.2-kilometre (22.5-mile) stage by twenty-five seconds over the next closest competitor, and at least one-and-a-half minutes into all of his rivals for the general classification. He became the 98th rider to win stages at each of the three Grand Tours as a result of the victory. He held the red and green jerseys – as the leader of both the general and points classifications – for the remainder of the race, as he became the first Slovenian rider to win a Grand Tour. A successful 2019 season was crowned with wins in two Italian races in October: the Giro dell'Emilia, and Tre Valli Varesine.

==== 2020 - Tour runner-up, second Vuelta win ====
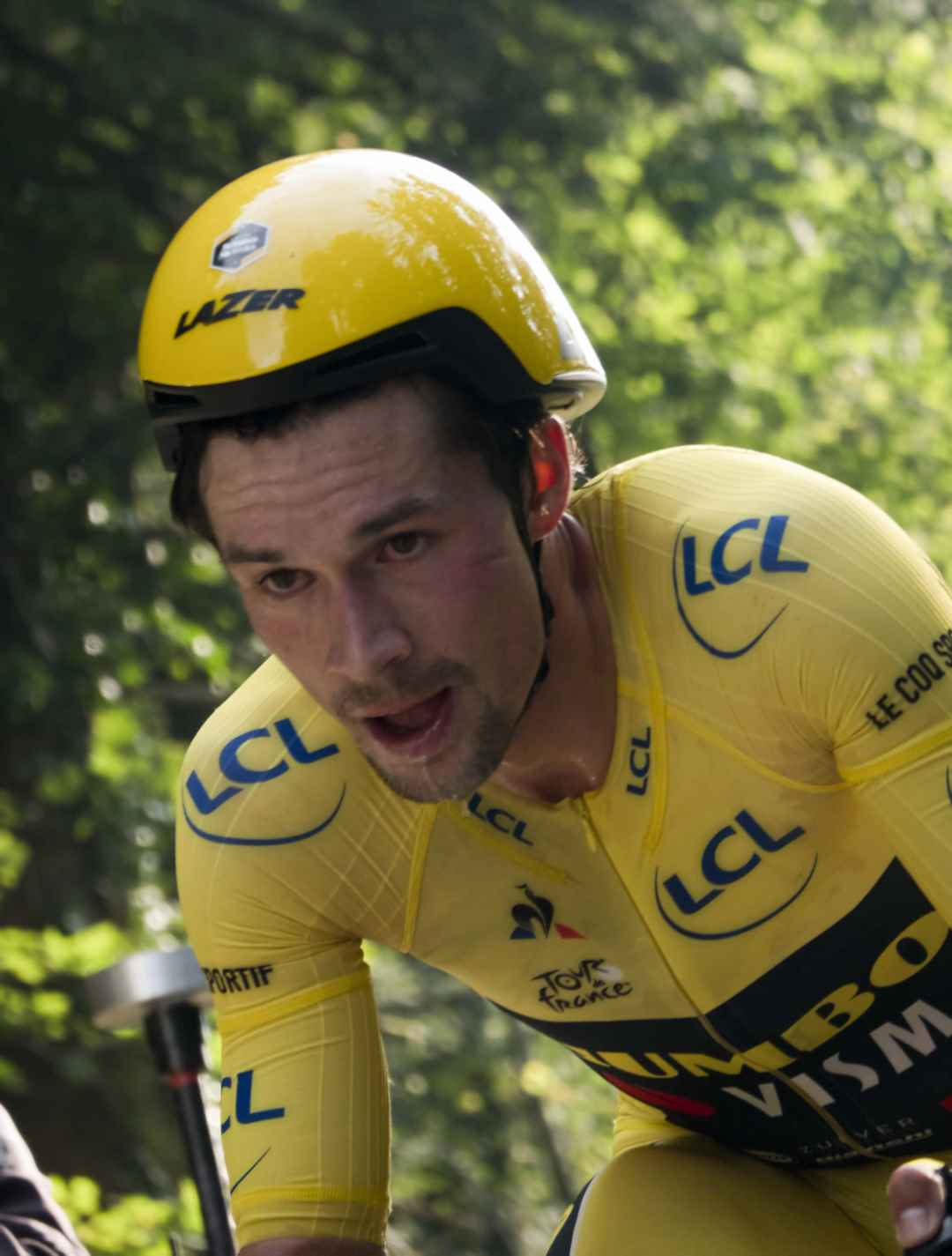
Roglič during the final time trial of the 2020 Tour de France

Due to the COVID-19 pandemic, Roglič's first race of the season was the Slovenian National Road Race Championships, on 21 June. On the final climb to the finish at Ambrož pod Krvavcem, Roglič soloed away from Tadej Pogačar in the closing 2 kilometres (1.2 miles), winning the national road race title for the first time. The following weekend, Pogačar beat Roglič by 8.5 seconds in the Slovenian National Time Trial Championships. Roglič started strong at the Tour de France, winning the fourth stage, ahead of Pogačar; he took the overall race lead on the ninth stage, finishing second, behind Pogačar, in a five-rider sprint finish in Laruns. After Egan Bernal lost seven minutes on stage 15, Pogačar was the only rider that was within a minute of Roglič in the general classification; Roglič had extended his advantage from 40 seconds to 57 seconds on the summit finish to the Col de la Loze, maintaining that lead going into the penultimate day, a 36.2-kilometre (22.5-mile) individual time trial that finished at La Planche des Belles Filles. He rode fairly well in the final time trial, being bested by several riders, but Pogačar managed to overturn the advantage that Roglič held, bettering his stage time by almost two minutes, giving Pogačar an ultimately race-winning margin of 59 seconds.

The following weekend, Roglič recorded a sixth-place finish in the road race at the World Championships, finishing at the back of a five-rider group that had been battling for the silver medal. At Liège–Bastogne–Liège, Roglič took his first Monument classic victory, pipping world champion Julian Alaphilippe on the line, after Alaphilippe had slowed down to start celebrating his presumptive victory. Roglič then contested the Vuelta a España as defending champion; he won the race's opening stage at the Alto de Arrate in Eibar, before losing the race lead to Richard Carapaz on stage six, after encountering issues putting on a rain jacket. However, he bounced back on stage eight, which finished atop the Alto de Moncavillo. After following attacks from Hugh Carthy and Carapaz on the steepest section of the climb, Roglič put in an attack in the final kilometre that was answered only by Carapaz. Although Carapaz tried to distance Roglič, Roglič countered his attack, eventually soloing across the line 13 seconds ahead of Carapaz. This win elevated Roglič to second place overall, 13 seconds behind Carapaz.

On stage ten, Roglič followed a move initiated by Guillaume Martin (Cofidis) and taken up by Andrea Bagioli (Deceuninck–Quick-Step) in the final kilometre of a relatively flat stage; he passed Bagioli to win the uphill sprint by several bike lengths. Carapaz, despite having been present in the front positions for much of the final kilometres, crossed the line three seconds behind Roglič and by virtue of the ten bonus seconds awarded to the stage winner, both riders were equal on time at the end of the stage. With a lower value of cumulative stage placings, Roglič took the red jersey ahead of the mountainous third weekend of the race, characterised by challenging mountain stages. At the start of stage 11 a rider protest was held in Villaviciosa, led by Carapaz's teammate Chris Froome, regarding the decision made by the commissaires to change the three-second time gap ruling to a one-second time gap. Even though the decision was in Roglič's favour, his teammate George Bennett claimed that Roglič was in agreement with the protest. On stage 12, Roglič struggled on the steepest slopes of the Alto de l'Angliru, crossing the line in fifth place. He lost 26 seconds, including time bonuses, to stage winner Carthy, who moved into third overall. Additionally, he lost ten seconds to Carapaz, who assumed the red jersey ahead of the race's lone individual time trial.

Following the rest day, Roglič won the time trial – his fourth stage win – which finished atop the steep climb of Mirador de Ézaro. He gained 25 seconds on Carthy and 49 seconds on Carapaz, reclaiming the red jersey. On stage 16, Roglič gained an additional six bonus seconds on his rivals after he sprinted to second place on the stage, giving him an advantage of 45 seconds over Carapaz and 53 seconds over Carthy ahead of the final mountain stage. On the penultimate stage, Roglič was unable to follow an attack by Carapaz around 4 kilometres (2.5 miles) from the top of La Covatilla. He lost 21 seconds to Carapaz, almost halving his race lead to 24 seconds; with only the flat, ceremonial stage to Madrid left, this put Roglič in position to win the race. He safely negotiated the last stage to successfully defend the Vuelta title, the first rider to repeat as Vuelta champion since Roberto Heras, who won the Vuelta from 2003 to 2005. Aside from winning the red jersey, Roglič also won the points classification for the second successive year, holding the lead from start-to-finish – the first rider to do so at a Grand Tour, since Mario Cipollini at the 1997 Giro d'Italia.

==== 2021 - third Vuelta win ====
Roglič won three stages at Paris–Nice, but lost the overall victory on the final day, after crashing twice and falling to 15th overall. With his stage victories, he also won the points classification. Roglič also won the general classification at his next start, the Tour of the Basque Country; he won the opening stage individual time trial, and also won the points and mountains classifications. Roglič contested all three Ardennes classics for the first time, recording a best finish of second place, at La Flèche Wallonne. After taking two third-place stage finishes in the opening weekend of the Tour de France, Roglič crashed on stage 3 and lost over a minute. Having regained his top-ten placing overall after the fifth stage individual time trial, Roglič lost over half an hour on the first stage in the Alps, and ultimately failed to start the ninth stage. He returned to racing at the COVID-19 pandemic-delayed Tokyo Olympics; he finished 28th in the road race, before taking the gold medal – Slovenia's first in cycling – in the time trial, finishing over a minute clear of his Team Jumbo–Visma teammate Tom Dumoulin, riding for the Netherlands.

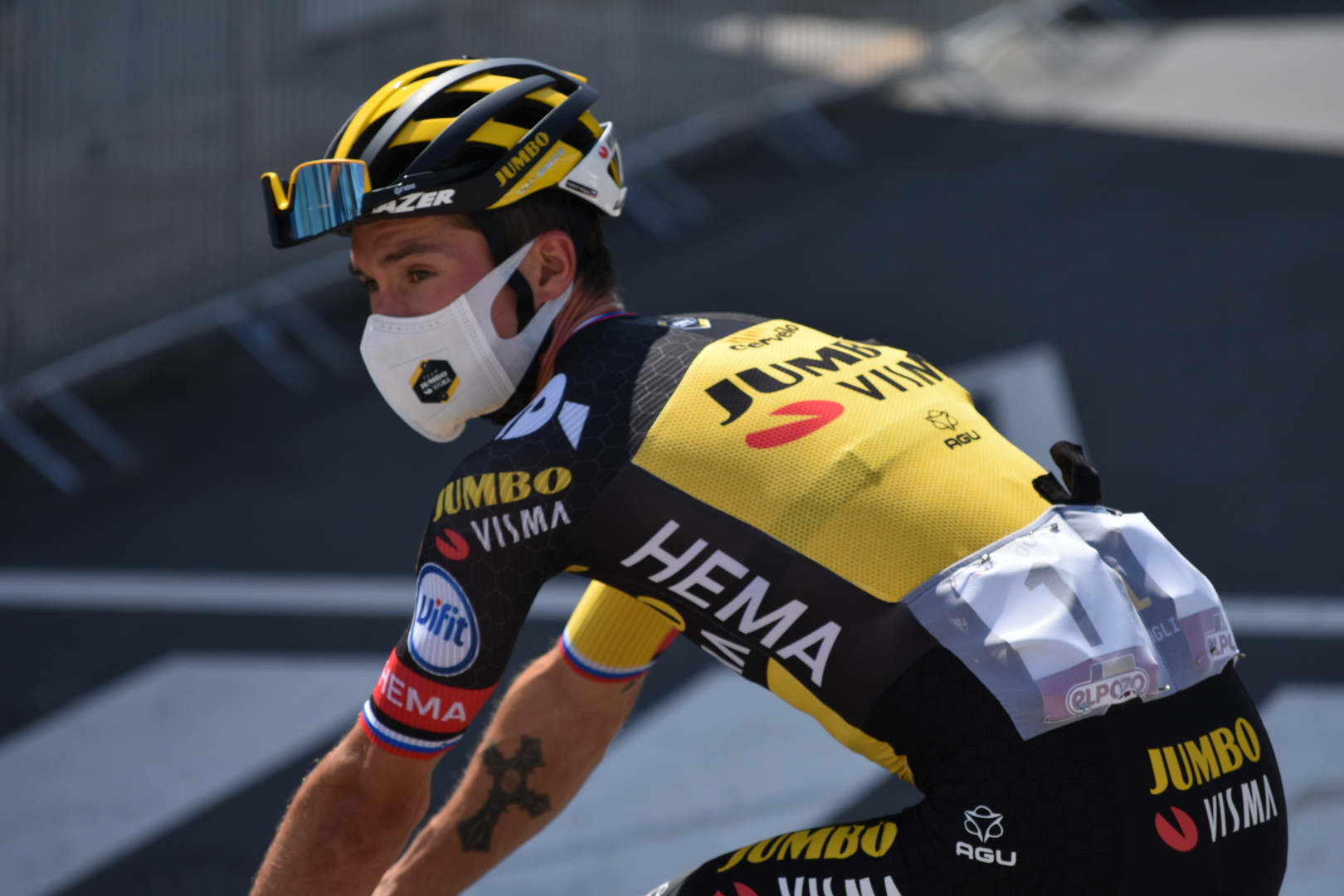
Roglič at the 2021 Vuelta a España

Roglič maintained this form going into the Vuelta a España, winning the opening individual time trial stage in Burgos. He ceded the lead of the race on stage three to Rein Taaramäe, following a successful breakaway. Roglič regained the race lead from Kenny Elissonde following stage six, finishing second to Magnus Cort on the stage. On the mountainous ninth stage, Roglič and two other riders bridged up to a previous attack that had been made by Miguel Ángel López and Adam Yates on the final climb of the Alto de Velefique. Roglič and Enric Mas were able to drop the others, and they finished second and third on the stage behind Damiano Caruso; Roglič led Mas by 28 seconds going into the first rest day, with nobody else within 1' 20".

Following the first rest day, Roglič ceded the race lead again, as a 31-rider breakaway including Odd Christian Eiking and Guillaume Martin finished clear of the peloton; Eiking and Martin both moved ahead of Roglič, who was 2' 17" down in the general classification. Roglič had attempted to go clear of a select group of general classification contenders, but crashed on the descent of the Puerto de Almáchar. On the following stage, Roglič won his second stage of the race, culminating on a steep uphill finish in Valdepeñas de Jaén. He maintained his third place overall for the next five stages, but was able to close in on Eiking by twenty seconds on stage fourteen. On stage seventeen to Lagos de Covadonga, Roglič followed an attack by Egan Bernal with 61 kilometres (38 miles) remaining, with the pair working together to achieve and maintain a lead of around 90 seconds prior to the final climb. With 7.5 kilometres (4.7 miles) left, Roglič dropped Bernal and soloed to the stage victory by 1' 35" from the chasing group of general classification contenders. Roglič extended his lead over Mas on each of the two remaining uphill finishes, and bookended his race with another individual time trial victory in Santiago de Compostela, winning his third successive Vuelta a España by 4' 42" over Mas – the biggest winning margin at the race since Alex Zülle's second Vuelta win in 1997.

==== 2022 - injury struggles ====
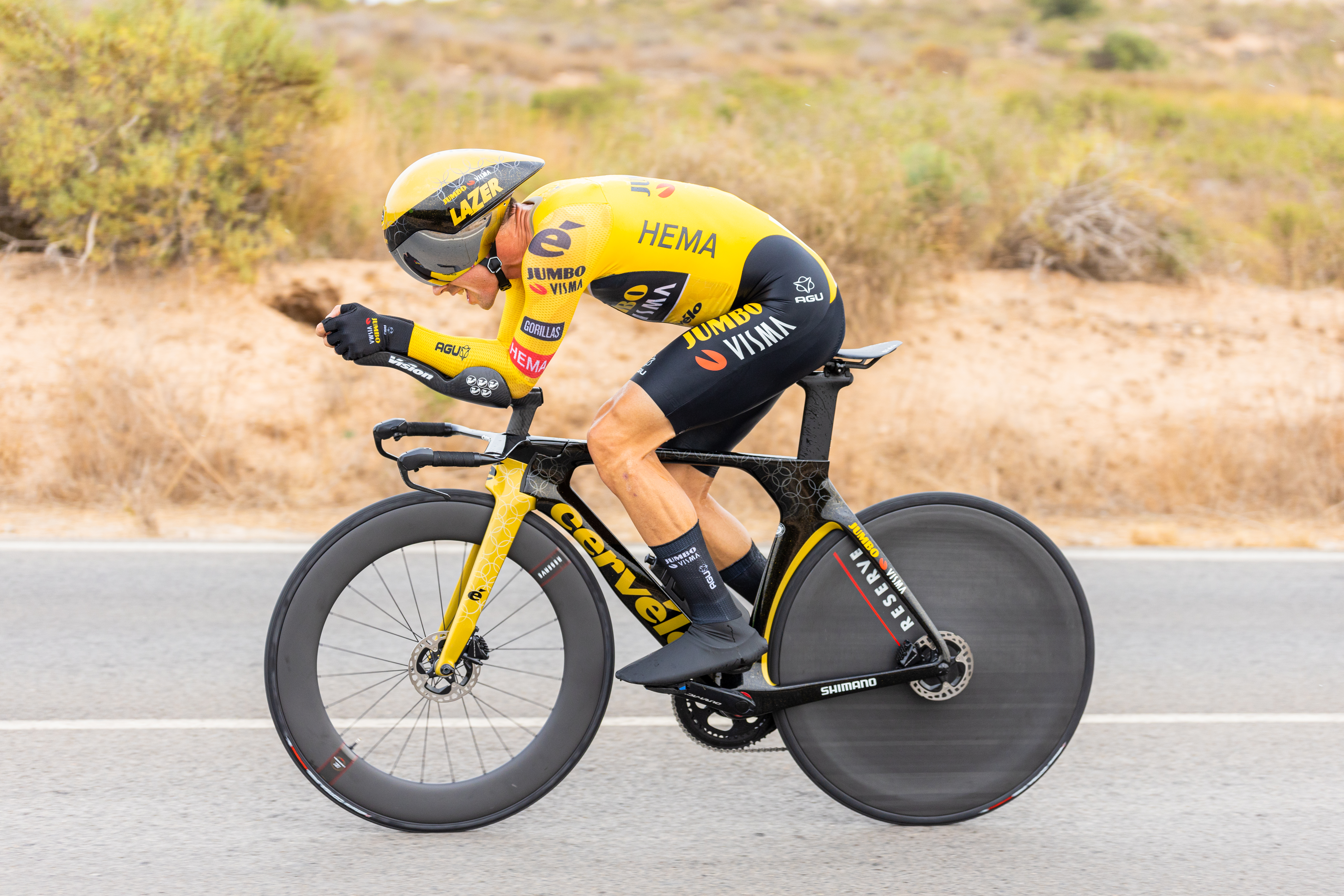
Roglič at the 2022 Vuelta a España

He started off the 2022 season with a block of racing in France, including Paris–Nice. On the opening stage, Team Jumbo–Visma split the race apart in the crosswinds, and on the finishing circuit around Mantes-la-Ville, Christophe Laporte upped the pace to an extent that only Wout van Aert and Roglič were able to follow. The trio remained clear to the end with Laporte winning the stage ahead of Roglič and van Aert. After another second-place stage finish on the fourth stage individual time trial, Roglič assumed the race lead the following day during the fifth stage to Saint-Sauveur-de-Montagut. He won the penultimate stage that finished at the top of the Col de Turini, and finished third on the final stage into Nice, as he won the race by 29 seconds ahead of Simon Yates. He won the opening stage of the Tour of the Basque Country, but lost the race lead on the penultimate stage after being dropped – this was attributed to a knee injury that had occurred pre-race; he ultimately finished the race in eighth overall. In June, he won the Critérium du Dauphiné in preparation for the Tour de France, finishing second on the two mountain stages at the end of the race.

He started the Tour de France off with eighth in the opening time trial in Copenhagen, slower than general classification contenders Jonas Vingegaard and Tadej Pogačar. On the fifth stage, Roglič lost more than two minutes to Pogačar after crashing into a hay bale that had been dislodged into the road. As a result of the crash, he dislocated his shoulder, which he had to put back into place himself. Having finished third on the summit finish to La Planche des Belles Filles two stages later, Roglič and Vingegaard attacked Pogačar on several occasions throughout the eleventh stage as part of a multifaceted plan to confuse and break Pogačar. Vingegaard ultimately dropped Pogačar on his way to the stage victory and the yellow jersey atop the Col du Granon. Roglič then worked as a domestique for Vingegaard over the following stages, before withdrawing from the race ahead of the final rest day. There was widespread speculation that this was a selfish move by Roglič in order to give his earlier injuries a chance to heal ahead of the Vuelta a España, but it was eventually confirmed that the decision was made by team management. It was also revealed by the team that Roglič may have been hurt worse than he appeared and while it was clarified that he was hoping to target the Vuelta.

Roglič then started the Vuelta a España, hoping to retain the title he had won three years in a row previously. He took victory and the race leader's red jersey on stage 4, but lost the lead to Remco Evenepoel after stage 6. Evenepoel further increased his lead over Roglič further during the stage 10 time trial to Alicante. On stage 16's uphill finish, Roglič launched an attack to take back time on Evenepoel, but was caught by others riders and was then brought down in a crash with Fred Wright. Despite the crash, he gained 8 seconds on Evenepoel. However, due to the injuries sustained, he had to retire from the race the following day. Following the events, Roglič and his team heavily criticised Wright, stating that "Wright came from behind and rode the handlebars out of my hands before I knew it".

In October, Roglic was awarded the Golden Order of Merit by Slovenia's president, Borut Pahor, for "outstanding sports achievement" and promoting Slovenia on the world stage.

==== 2023 - Giro d'Italia victory ====
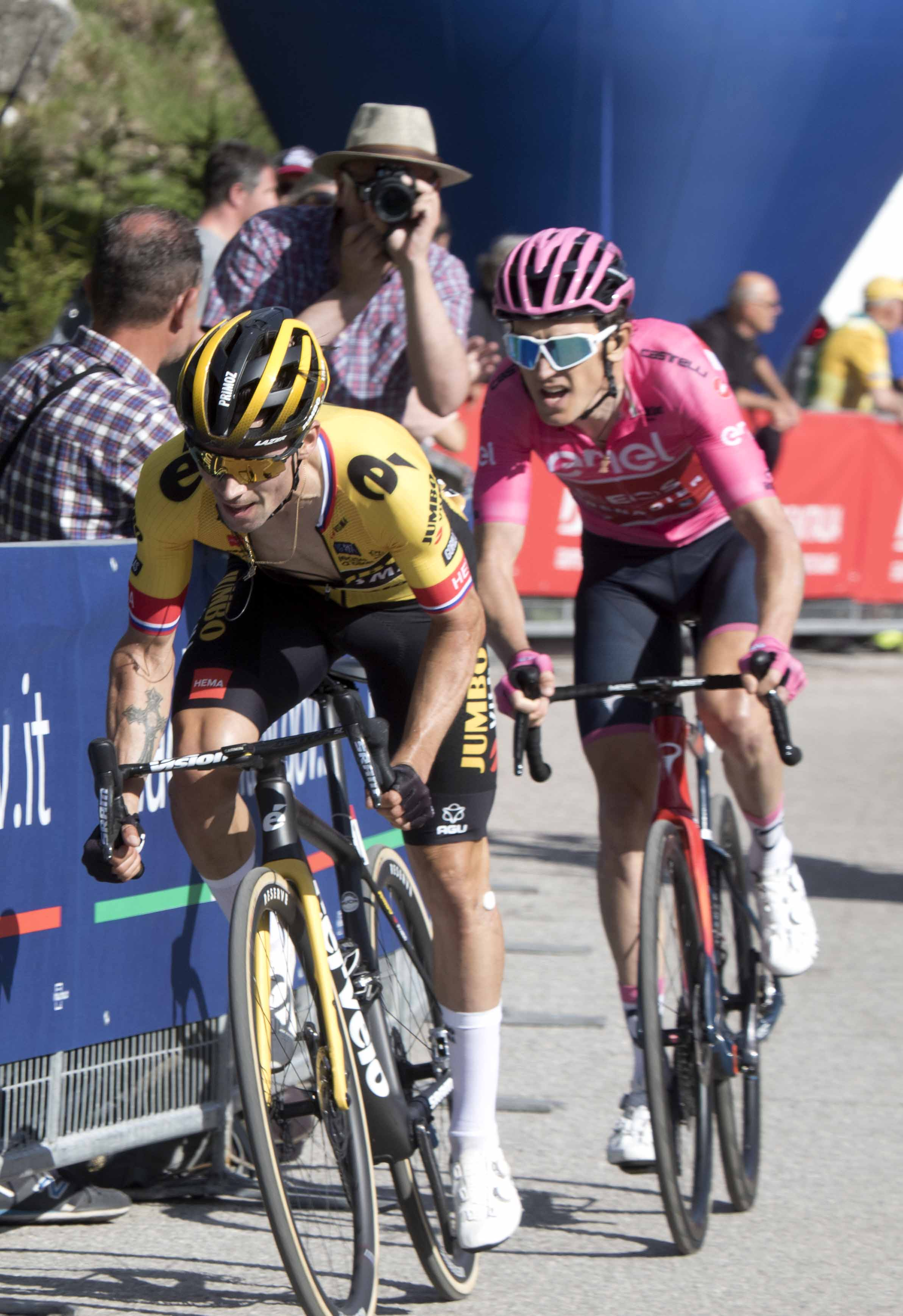
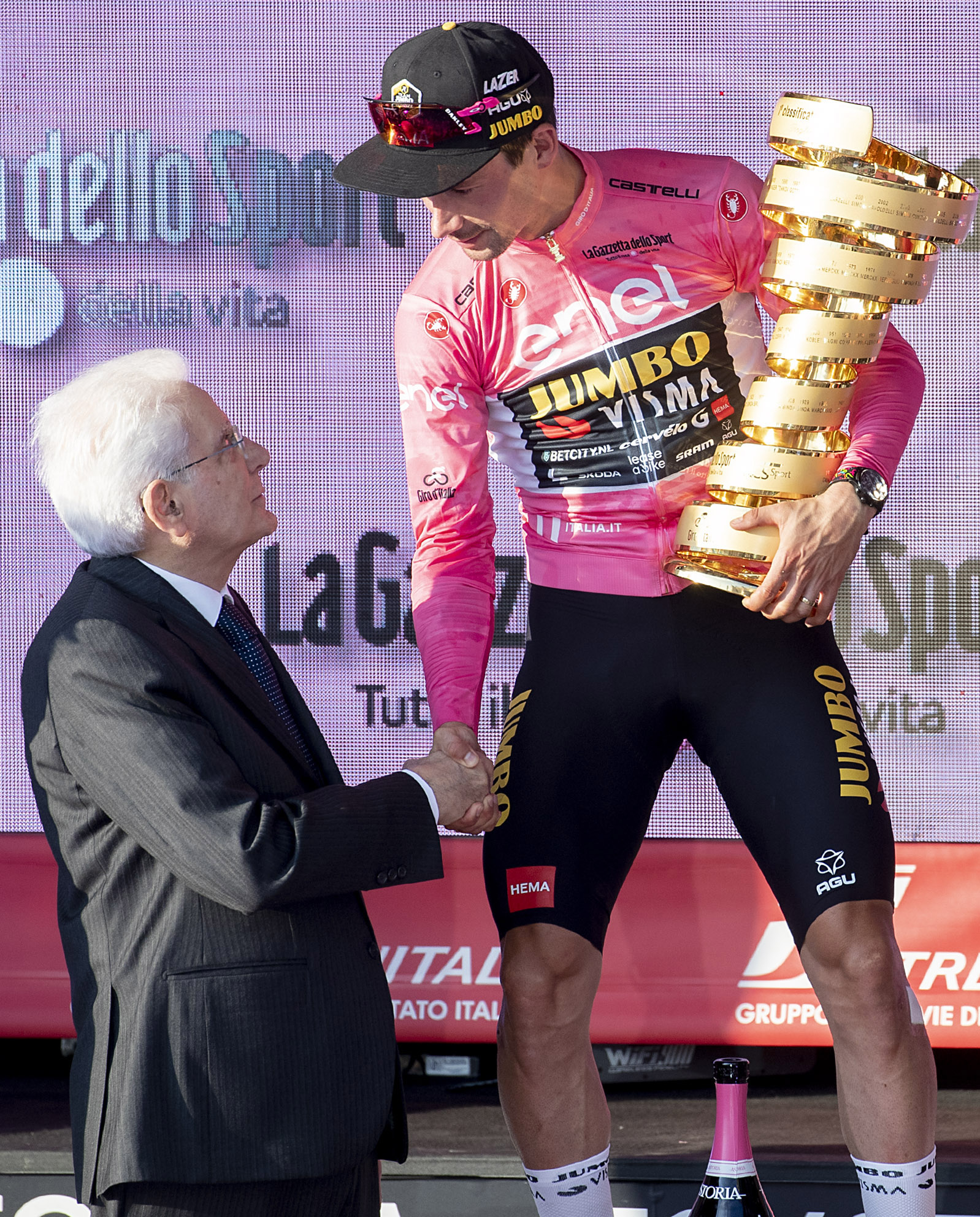
Roglič beat Geraint Thomas (right in the left picture) in a close battle to win the 2023 Giro d'Italia (trophy presentation pictured right).

After two years of injury and disappointment at the Tour, Roglič elected to target the Giro d'Italia for the 2023 season, calling it ""a race I love but haven't won yet", and had unfinished business after his podium finish in 2019.

Roglič began his season at Tirreno–Adriatico, winning three successive stages and taking overall victory, 18 seconds ahead of João Almeida (UAE Team Emirates). Next, he raced the Volta a Catalunya, winning two stages and again taking victory in the general classification by a narrow margin of 6 seconds ahead of Remco Evenepoel.

In May, Roglič started the Giro d'Italia, where he was one of the favourites for overall victory. After suffering two crashes in the first week of the race, Roglič was still well positioned in the general classification, sitting in second overall behind Geraint Thomas after race leader Evenepoel abandoned following a positive COVID-19 test. Roglič struggled on stage 16 to Monte Bondone, losing 25 seconds to Thomas and João Almeida, slipping to third in the general classification. After strong performances in the mountain stages 18 and 19, Roglič regained second overall and lay 26 seconds behind Thomas heading into the penultimate stage. Despite suffering a dropped chain during the steep mountain-top finish, Roglič won the stage, gaining 40 seconds on Thomas and moving into the overall lead. He held the lead on the final, largely ceremonial stage into Rome to win the Giro d'Italia, becoming the first Slovenian ever to win the race.

Roglič did not race again until August, where he rode the Vuelta a Burgos, winning the general classification, points jersey, and two stages. He went on to the Vuelta a España, where he won stages 8 and 17 before finishing third overall behind teammates Jonas Vingegaard and Sepp Kuss in a historic podium sweep for Team Jumbo–Visma.

To finish his season, Roglič raced the Italian autumn classics, starting with the Giro dell'Emilia. Prior to the race, Roglič announced to reporters that he would leave Team Jumbo–Visma at the end of the season, despite his contract originally running through 2024 During the race, Roglič accelerated away from Tadej Pogačar and Simon Yates on the Colle della Guardia di San Luca to win the Giro dell'Emilia for the third time in his career. Roglič ended his racing season at the Giro di Lombardia, finishing in third behind Tadej Pogačar and Andrea Bagioli.

On 6 October, Roglič's transfer to Bora–Hansgrohe for the 2024 season was confirmed at a press conference, ending his eight-year stint with Team Jumbo–Visma. While many details of the contract were kept private, team manager Ralph Denk confirmed the deal was for "more than one year", and that Roglič would lead the team at the 2024 Tour de France.

=== Red Bull–Bora–Hansgrohe (2024–present) ===
==== 2024 - record-tying fourth Vuelta victory ====
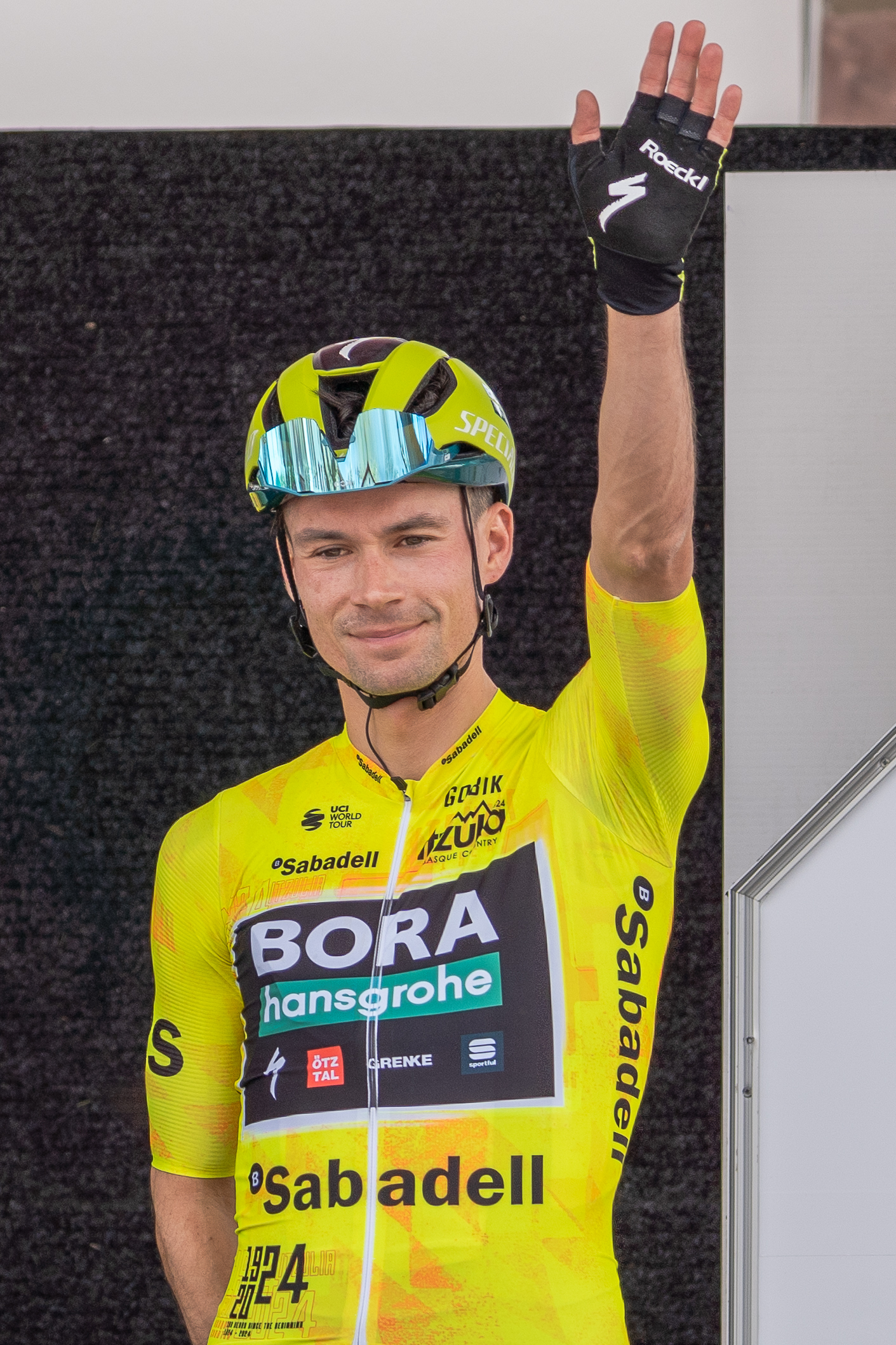
Roglič wearing the leader's jersey at the 2024 Tour of the Basque Country.

Roglič started his season at Paris–Nice, where he was among the pre-race favorites for the overall win. Despite high expectations, Roglič struggled in his first race with a new team, finishing 10th overall and 5:33 behind the winner Matteo Jorgenson.

In April, Roglič won the opening time trial at the Tour of the Basque Country, even after taking a wrong turn just before the finish line. He maintained the overall lead until stage 4, where a severe downhill crash involving multiple riders forced him to abandon the race. Several riders were hospitalized, but Roglič avoided any fractures or long-term injuries. However, his injuries were significant enough to disrupt his racing and training schedule, and he was forced to withdraw from the Ardennes classics to focus on recovery, prioritizing his form for the year's main objective, the Tour de France.

Roglič returned to racing in June at the 2024 Critérium du Dauphiné. He showed strong form, coming third in the stage 3 time trial and winning consecutive mountain-top finishes on stages 6 and 7. However, Roglič struggled on the final stage 8, losing 54 seconds to second place Matteo Jorgenson, hanging on to win the general classification by just 8 seconds.

Roglič was named team leader for the 2024 Tour de France, the team's first race with the new Red Bull-BORA-hansgrohe name. In coverage of the race, Roglič was grouped together with Tadej Pogačar, Jonas Vingegaard, and Remco Evenepoel as part of the Big Four, known for their dominance in stage races. During the race, Roglič came third in the stage 7 individual time trial, and was in fourth place in the general classification before crashing on a descent near the finish line on stage 12. He pulled out of the race the following day.

Roglič's next race was the 2024 Vuelta a España, where he started the race for the 6th consecutive year. After placing 8th in the opening stage time trial, Roglič took the overall lead and stage victory on stage 4. On stage 6, Roglič ceded the red jersey to Ben O'Connor, who won the stage from the breakaway and established a nearly 5 minute lead over Roglič and the rest of the general classification contenders. Roglič took another stage victory on stage 8, beating Enric Mas in a sprint on a mountain top finish to Cazorla. Roglič gained further time on O'Connor on the mountainous stages 13, 15, and 16, despite a 20-second penalty on stage 15 for illegally drafting behind his team car before the final climb. Roglič reclaimed the overall lead on stage 19, with a solo victory on the Alto de Moncalvillo. He defended his lead on the final two stages to win his 4th Vuelta, equaling Robert Heras's record.

Roglič was initially schedule to compete in Il Lombardia, hoping to win the monument he had podiumed last year, but after poor preparation and consecutive DNFs in the Giro dell'Emilia and Coppa Bernocchi, his team decided that his season had ended.

==== 2025 ====
Roglič started his season at the Volta ao Algarve, where he finished 8th overall. Despite not being in contention for the win, Roglič stated after the race he was satisfied with his performance and how his form was building to his main goals for the season, like the 2025 Giro d'Italia. In March, he raced the Volta a Catalunya. After coming second in a photo finish to Juan Ayuso on stage 3, Roglič beat Ayuso on stage 4 in another close sprint to take the stage victory and go into the overall lead. After Ayuso placed third in an intermediate sprint, Roglič trailed him by one second heading into the final stage, a six-lap circuit around Barcelona. Roglič attacked with 20 km to go, quickly gaining a gap and riding solo to win the stage and seal the overall victory. Starting the Giro d'Italia as one of the favorites for the General Classification, Roglič took the lead for the pink jersey on Stage 7; he ultimately dropped out of the bike race during Stage 16 due to the cumulative impact of the injuries he suffered through multiple crashes during the Giro.

Roglič took part in the 2025 Tour de France, with the intention being that he would lead the team. After Stage 16 of the race, which finished at the top of Mont Ventoux, he had climbed to fifth place overall, however his teammate Florian Lipowitz was in third. On Stage 18, after Lipowitz had attacked and was caught, Roglič chose not to help him and finished 53 seconds ahead of him on the stage. On Stage 19, Roglič himself attacked on the Col du Pre; he was caught and finished 12 minutes behind winner Thymen Arensman, falling to eighth place on the General Classification, the position in which he finished the race.

== Major results ==
2014 (1 pro win)
1st Croatia–Slovenia
1st Stage 2 Tour d'Azerbaïdjan
3rd Overall Sibiu Cycling Tour

1st Mountains classification

4th Road race, National Road Championships
7th Overall Giro della Regione Friuli Venezia Giulia
9th Overall Tour of Al Zubarah
2015 (5)
1st Overall Tour d'Azerbaïdjan

1st Stage 2

1st Overall Tour of Slovenia

1st Stage 3

1st Mountains classification, Settimana Internazionale di Coppi e Bartali
2nd Overall Tour of Croatia
2nd GP Izola
4th Overall Tour of Qinghai Lake

1st Stage 5

5th Overall Istrian Spring Trophy
2016 (2)
National Road Championships

1st Time trial
5th Road race

1st Stage 9 (ITT) Giro d'Italia
4th Overall Tour du Poitou Charentes
5th Overall Volta ao Algarve
7th Time trial, UEC European Road Championships
10th Time trial, Olympic Games
2017 (6)
1st Overall Volta ao Algarve
1st Stage 17 Tour de France
2nd Time trial, UCI Road World Championships
2nd Overall Ster ZLM Toer

1st Prologue

3rd Overall Tour de Romandie

1st Stage 5 (ITT)

4th Overall Tirreno–Adriatico
5th Road race, National Road Championships
5th Overall Tour of the Basque Country

1st Stages 4 & 6 (ITT)

2018 (8)
1st Overall Tour of the Basque Country

1st Points classification
1st Stage 4 (ITT)

1st Overall Tour de Romandie
1st Overall Tour of Slovenia

1st Stages 4 & 5 (ITT)

1st Stage 3 Tirreno–Adriatico
3rd Overall Tour of Britain

1st Stage 5 (TTT)

4th Overall Tour de France

1st Stage 19

6th Overall Volta a la Comunitat Valenciana
7th Giro dell'Emilia
2019 (13)
1st Overall Vuelta a España

1st Points classification
1st Stage 10 (ITT)
Combativity award Stage 10

1st Overall Tour de Romandie

1st Points classification
1st Stages 1, 4 & 5 (ITT)

1st Overall UAE Tour

1st Stages 1 (TTT) & 6

1st Overall Tirreno–Adriatico
1st Giro dell'Emilia
1st Tre Valli Varesine
3rd Overall Giro d'Italia

1st Stages 1 (ITT) & 9 (ITT)
Held after Stages 1–5
Held after Stage 1

3rd Chrono des Nations
4th Road race, National Road Championships
7th Giro di Lombardia
2020 (12)
National Road Championships

1st Road race
2nd Time trial

1st Overall Vuelta a España

1st Points classification
1st Stages 1, 8, 10 & 13 (ITT)

1st Overall Tour de l'Ain

1st Points classification
1st Stages 2 & 3

1st Liège–Bastogne–Liège
1st Stage 2 Critérium du Dauphiné
2nd Overall Tour de France

1st Stage 4
Held after Stages 9–19

6th Road race, UCI Road World Championships
2021 (13)
1st Time trial, Olympic Games
1st Overall Vuelta a España

1st Stages 1 (ITT), 11, 17 & 21 (ITT)

1st Overall Tour of the Basque Country

1st Points classification
1st Mountains classification
1st Stage 1 (ITT)

1st Giro dell'Emilia
1st Milano–Torino
Paris–Nice

1st Points classification
1st Stages 4, 6 & 7

2nd La Flèche Wallonne
4th Giro di Lombardia
2022 (5)
1st Overall Paris–Nice

1st Stage 7

1st Overall Critérium du Dauphiné
Vuelta a España

1st Stages 1 (TTT) & 4
Held after Stage 4

8th Overall Tour of the Basque Country

1st Stage 1 (ITT)

2023 (15)
1st Overall Giro d'Italia

1st Stage 20 (ITT)

1st Overall Tirreno–Adriatico

1st Points classification
1st Mountains classification
1st Stages 4, 5 & 6

1st Overall Volta a Catalunya

1st Points classification
1st Stages 1 & 5

1st Overall Vuelta a Burgos

1st Points classification
1st Stages 2 (TTT), 3 & 5

1st Giro dell'Emilia
3rd Overall Vuelta a España

1st Stages 8 & 17

3rd Giro di Lombardia
4th Tre Valli Varesine
2024 (8)
1st Overall Vuelta a España

1st Stages 4, 8 & 19
Held after Stage 8

1st Overall Critérium du Dauphiné

1st Points classification
1st Stages 6 & 7

1st Stage 1 (ITT) Tour of the Basque Country
10th Overall Paris–Nice
2025 (3)
1st Overall Volta a Catalunya

1st Points classification
1st Mountains classification
1st Stages 4 & 7

5th Giro dell'Emilia
8th Overall Tour de France
8th Overall Volta ao Algarve
Giro d'Italia

Held after Stages 2 & 7

2026 (2)
UEC European Road Championships

1st Time trial
10th Road race

National Road Championships

1st Time trial
4th Road race

2nd Overall Vuelta a España
3rd Milano–Torino
5th Overall Tirreno–Adriatico
8th Overall Tour de Suisse

=== General classification results timeline ===
Grand Tour general classification results
| Grand Tour | 2016 | 2017 | 2018 | 2019 | 2020 | 2021 | 2022 | 2023 | 2024 | 2025 | 2026 |
| Giro d'Italia | 58 | — | — | 3 | — | — | — | 1 | — | DNF | — |
| Tour de France | — | 38 | 4 | — | 2 | DNF | DNF | — | DNF | 8 | — |
| Vuelta a España | — | — | — | 1 | 1 | 1 | DNF | 3 | 1 | — | 2 |
Major stage race general classification results
| Major stage race | 2016 | 2017 | 2018 | 2019 | 2020 | 2021 | 2022 | 2023 | 2024 | 2025 | 2026 |
| Paris–Nice | — | — | — | — | — | 15 | 1 | — | 10 | — | — |
| Tirreno–Adriatico | 52 | 4 | 29 | 1 | — | — | — | 1 | — | — | 5 |
| Volta a Catalunya | 44 | — | — | — | NH | — | — | 1 | — | 1 | — |
| Tour of the Basque Country | — | 5 | 1 | — | NH | 1 | 8 | — | DNF | — | 16 |
| Tour de Romandie | — | 3 | 1 | 1 | NH | — | — | — | — | — | 18 |
| Critérium du Dauphiné | — | — | — | — | DNF | — | 1 | — | 1 | — | — |
| Tour de Suisse | — | — | — | — | NH | — | — | — | — | — | 8 |

=== Classics results timeline ===
| Monument | 2016 | 2017 | 2018 | 2019 | 2020 | 2021 | 2022 | 2023 | 2024 | 2025 | 2026 |
|---|---|---|---|---|---|---|---|---|---|---|---|
| Milan–San Remo | — | 67 | — | — | — | — | 17 | — | — | — | 37 |
| Tour of Flanders | Has not contested during his career | | | | | | | | | | |
| Paris–Roubaix | Has not contested during his career | | | | | | | | | | |
| Liège–Bastogne–Liège | — | — | — | — | 1 | 13 | — | — | — | — | — |
| Giro di Lombardia | — | 40 | 17 | 7 | — | 4 | — | 3 | — | 22 | 68 |
| Classic | 2016 | 2017 | 2018 | 2019 | 2020 | 2021 | 2022 | 2023 | 2024 | 2025 | 2026 |
| Strade Bianche | 74 | 35 | 48 | — | — | — | — | — | — | — | — |
| Milano–Torino | — | 66 | — | — | — | 1 | — | — | — | — | 3 |
| Amstel Gold Race | — | — | — | — | NH | 69 | — | — | — | — | — |
| La Flèche Wallonne | — | — | — | — | — | 2 | — | — | — | — | — |
| Clásica de San Sebastián | — | 21 | DNF | — | NH | — | — | — | — | 22 | — |
| Giro dell'Emilia | — | — | 7 | 1 | — | 1 | — | 1 | DNF | 5 | — |
| Tre Valli Varesine | — | — | 22 | 1 | NH | — | — | 4 | NR | 13 | — |

=== Major championships results timeline ===
| Event | | 2013 | 2014 | 2015 | 2016 | 2017 | 2018 | 2019 | 2020 | 2021 | 2022 | 2023 | 2024 | 2025 | 2026 |
|---|---|---|---|---|---|---|---|---|---|---|---|---|---|---|---|
| Olympic Games | Road race | Not held | | | 26 | Not held | | | | 28 | Not held | | — | Not held | |
| Olympic Games | Time trial | Not held | | | 10 | Not held | | | | 1 | Not held | | — | Not held | |
| World Championships | Road race | — | — | — | — | 121 | 34 | DNF | 6 | 48 | — | — | 65 | 11 | 21 |
| World Championships | Time trial | — | — | — | 24 | 2 | — | 12 | — | — | — | — | 12 | — | — |
| European Championships | Road race | Not held | | | — | — | — | — | — | — | — | — | — | — | 10 |
| European Championships | Time trial | Not held | | | 7 | — | — | — | — | — | — | — | — | — | 1 |
| National Championships | Road race | 10 | 4 | 7 | 5 | 5 | — | 4 | 1 | — | — | — | — | — | 4 |
| National Championships | Time trial | — | — | — | 1 | — | — | — | 2 | — | — | — | — | — | 1 |

Legend
| — | Did not compete |
| DNF | Did not finish |
| NH | Not Held |
| NR | No result |
| IP | In progress |

=== Awards ===
- Slovenian Road Cyclist of the Year: 2016, 2017, 2018, 2019, 2020
- Slovenian Sportsman of the Year: 2019, 2020
- Vélo d'Or: 2020
