= 2018 Giro dell'Emilia =

2018 UCI Europe Tour

Race details
- Dates: 6 October 2018
- Stages: 1
- Distance: 207.4 km (128.9 mi)
- Winning time: 5h 09' 35"

Results
	Winner	Alessandro De Marchi (ITA)	(BMC Racing Team)
	Second	Rigoberto Urán (COL)	(EF Education First–Drapac p/b Cannondale)
	Third	Dylan Teuns (BEL)	(Bahrain–Merida)

The 2018 Giro dell'Emilia was the 101st edition of the Giro dell'Emilia road cycling one day race. It was held on 6 October 2018 as part of the 2018 UCI Europe Tour in category 1.HC.

The race was won by Alessandro De Marchi of BMC Racing Team, ahead of Rigoberto Urán and Dylan Teuns.

== Teams ==
Twenty-five teams of up to seven riders started the race:

UCI WorldTeams

- AG2R La Mondiale
- Astana
- Bahrain–Merida
- BMC Racing Team
- EF Education First–Drapac p/b Cannondale
- Groupama–FDJ
- LottoNL–Jumbo
- Mitchelton–Scott
- Movistar Team
- Team Dimension Data
- Team Sky
- Trek–Segafredo
- UAE Team Emirates

UCI Professional Continental teams

- Androni Giocattoli–Sidermec
- Bardiani–CSF
- Caja Rural–Seguros RGA
- Gazprom–RusVelo
- Israel Cycling Academy
- Nippo–Vini Fantini–Europa Ovini
- Wilier Triestina–Selle Italia

UCI Continental Teams

- Amore & Vita–Prodir
- Biesse–Carrera Gavardo
- MsTina–Focus
- Sangemini–MG.K Vis Vega

National Teams

- Italy

== Results ==
Result
Rank	Rider	Team	Time
1	Alessandro De Marchi (ITA)	BMC Racing Team	5h 09' 35"
2	Rigoberto Urán (COL)	EF Education First–Drapac p/b Cannondale	+ 8"
3	Dylan Teuns (BEL)	Bahrain–Merida	+ 9"
4	Michael Woods (CAN)	EF Education First–Drapac p/b Cannondale	+ 9"
5	Thibaut Pinot (FRA)	Groupama–FDJ	+ 13"
6	Romain Bardet (FRA)	AG2R La Mondiale	+ 13"
7	Primož Roglič (SLO)	LottoNL–Jumbo	+ 13"
8	Vincenzo Nibali (ITA)	Bahrain–Merida	+ 15"
9	Domenico Pozzovivo (ITA)	Bahrain–Merida	+ 18"
10	Sébastien Reichenbach (SUI)	Groupama–FDJ	+ 21"
