= 2018 Liège–Bastogne–Liège =

Cycling race

2018 UCI World Tour, race 18 of 37
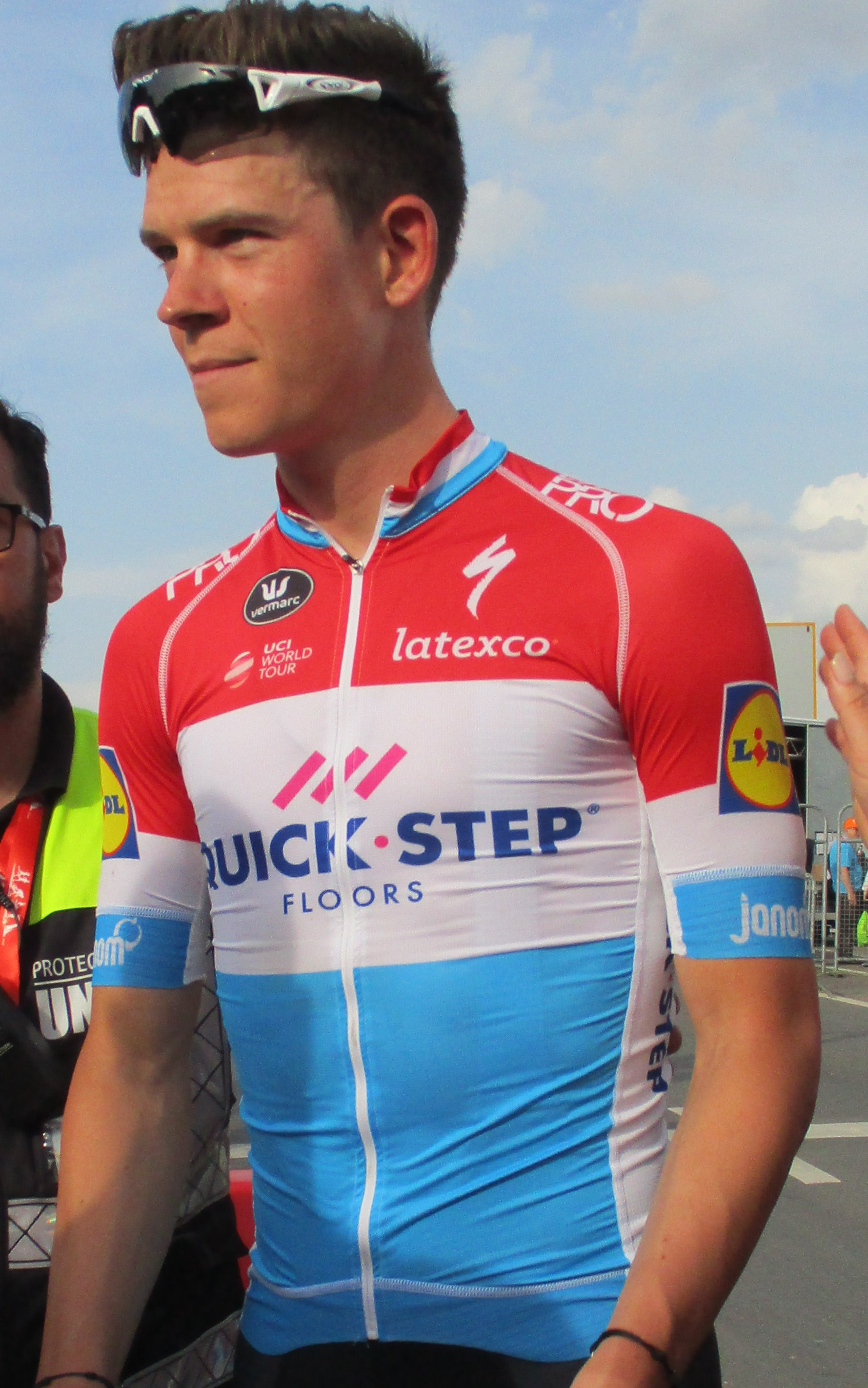
- Winner Bob Jungels after his victory

Race details
- Dates: 22 April 2018
- Stages: 1
- Distance: 258.5 km (160.6 mi)
- Winning time: 6h 24' 44"

Results
	Winner	Bob Jungels (LUX)	(Quick-Step Floors)
	Second	Michael Woods (CAN)	(EF Education First–Drapac p/b Cannondale)
	Third	Romain Bardet (FRA)	(AG2R La Mondiale)

The 2018 Liège–Bastogne–Liège was a road cycling one-day race that took place on 22 April 2018 in Belgium. It was the 104th edition of the Liège–Bastogne–Liège and the eighteenth event of the 2018 UCI World Tour.

The race was won by the champion of Luxembourg, Bob Jungels (Quick-Step Floors), who escaped on the Côte de la Roche-aux-Faucons. Canadian rider Michael Woods, riding for the EF Education First–Drapac p/b Cannondale team, won the sprint for second place ahead of AG2R La Mondiale's Romain Bardet for France.

== Teams ==
As Liège–Bastogne–Liège was a UCI World Tour event, all eighteen UCI WorldTeams were invited automatically and obliged to enter a team in the race. Seven UCI Professional Continental teams competed as wildcards, completing the 25-team peloton.

UCI WorldTeams

- AG2R La Mondiale
- Astana
- Bahrain–Merida
- BMC Racing Team
- Bora–Hansgrohe
- Team Dimension Data
- EF Education First–Drapac p/b Cannondale
- Team Katusha–Alpecin
- LottoNL–Jumbo
- Lotto–Soudal
- Mitchelton–Scott
- Movistar Team
- Quick-Step Floors
- Team Sky
- Team Sunweb
- Trek–Segafredo
- UAE Team Emirates
- Groupama–FDJ

UCI Professional Continental teams

- Aqua Blue Sport
- Cofidis
- Direct Énergie
- Fortuneo–Samsic
- Sport Vlaanderen–Baloise
- Wanty–Groupe Gobert
- WB Aqua Protect Veranclassic

== Result ==
Result
Rank	Rider	Team	Time
1	Bob Jungels (LUX)	Quick-Step Floors	6h 24' 44"
2	Michael Woods (CAN)	EF Education First–Drapac p/b Cannondale	+ 37"
3	Romain Bardet (FRA)	AG2R La Mondiale	+ 37"
4	Julian Alaphilippe (FRA)	Quick-Step Floors	+ 39"
5	Domenico Pozzovivo (ITA)	Bahrain–Merida	+ 39"
6	Enrico Gasparotto (ITA)	Bahrain–Merida	+ 39"
7	Davide Formolo (ITA)	Bora–Hansgrohe	+ 39"
8	Roman Kreuziger (CZE)	Mitchelton–Scott	+ 39"
9	Sergio Henao (COL)	Team Sky	+ 39"
10	Jakob Fuglsang (DEN)	Astana	+ 39"
