= 2023 Tre Valli Varesine =

- 2023 UCI ProSeries

Race details
- Dates: 3 October 2023
- Stages: 1
- Distance: 196.54 km (122.1 mi)
- Winning time: 4h 36' 11"

Results
	Winner	Ilan Van Wilder (BEL)	(Soudal–Quick-Step)
	Second	Richard Carapaz (ECU)	(EF Education–EasyPost)
	Third	Aleksandr Vlasov	(Bora–Hansgrohe)

The 2023 Tre Valli Varesine was the 102nd edition of the Tre Valli Varesine road cycling one day race, which was held in the Lombardy region of northwestern Italy on 3 October 2023. The race was the third of the 2023 Trittico Lombardo, which also included the Coppa Ugo Agostoni, held on 28 September and the Coppa Bernocchi held the day before.

== Teams ==
Seventeen UCI WorldTeams and eight UCI ProTeams made up the 25 teams that participated in the race.

UCI WorldTeams

- AG2R Citroën Team
- Alpecin–Deceuninck
- Arkéa–Samsic
- Astana Qazaqstan Team
- Bora–Hansgrohe
- Cofidis
- EF Education–EasyPost
- Groupama–FDJ
- Ineos Grenadiers
- Intermarché–Circus–Wanty
- Lidl–Trek
- Movistar Team
- Soudal–Quick-Step
- Team dsm–firmenich
- Team Jayco–AlUla
- Team Jumbo–Visma
- UAE Team Emirates

UCI ProTeams

- Bingoal WB
- Eolo–Kometa
- Green Project–Bardiani–CSF–Faizanè
- Israel–Premier Tech
- Lotto–Dstny
- Q36.5 Pro Cycling Team
- Team Corratec–Selle Italia
- Team TotalEnergies

== Result ==
Result
Rank	Rider	Team	Time
1	Ilan Van Wilder (BEL)	Soudal–Quick-Step	4h 36' 11"
2	Richard Carapaz (ECU)	EF Education–EasyPost	+ 16"
3	Aleksandr Vlasov	Astana Qazaqstan Team	+ 18"
4	Primož Roglič (SLO)	Team Jumbo–Visma	+ 18"
5	Tadej Pogačar (SLO)	UAE Team Emirates	+ 18"
6	Michael Woods (CAN)	Israel–Premier Tech	+ 18"
7	Filippo Zana (ITA)	Team Jayco–AlUla	+ 18"
8	Ion Izagirre (ESP)	Cofidis	+ 18"
9	Carlos Rodríguez (ESP)	Ineos Grenadiers	+ 18"
10	Ben O'Connor (AUS)	AG2R Citroën Team	+ 18"
