= 2021 Milano–Torino =

102nd edition of the Milano–Torino cycling classic

- 2021 UCI Europe Tour; 2021 UCI ProSeries

Race details
- Dates: 6 October 2021
- Stages: 1
- Distance: 190 km (118.1 mi)
- Winning time: 4h 17' 41"

Results
	Winner	Primož Roglič (SLO)	(Team Jumbo–Visma)
	Second	Adam Yates (GBR)	(Ineos Grenadiers)
	Third	João Almeida (POR)	(Deceuninck–Quick-Step)

The 2021 Milano–Torino was the 102nd edition of the Milano–Torino cycling classic. It was held on 6 October 2021 as part of the 2021 UCI Europe Tour and the 2021 UCI ProSeries calendars.

After the previous edition's route favoured the sprinters, the race returned to a more hilly route that favoured the climbers, despite being mostly flat. The 190-kilometre (120 mi) race started in Magenta on the outskirts of Milan and headed due southwest, though after around 35 kilometres (22 mi), the route took a nearly 100-kilometre (62 mi) U-shaped diversion to the north from Vercelli, which included the Zimone and Cossano Canavese hills midway through, before continuing the southwest direction from Crescentino. In the final 24 kilometres (15 mi), riders took on two ascents of the Superga hill, which had an average gradient of 9.1 percent, on the outskirts of Turin. The first ascent was 4.3 kilometres (2.7 mi) long, and after descending back down into San Mauro Torinese, riders took on the second ascent, which climbed up a further 0.6 kilometres (0.37 mi) to the finish line.

== Teams ==
15 of the 19 UCI WorldTeams and eight UCI ProTeams made up the 23 teams that participated in the race. Each team entered a full squad of seven riders, although Astana–Premier Tech had one non-starter. Of the 160 riders who started the race, 109 finished, while a further two riders finished outside of the time limit.

UCI WorldTeams

- AG2R Citroën Team
- Astana–Premier Tech
- Bora–Hansgrohe
- Cofidis
- Deceuninck–Quick-Step
- Groupama–FDJ
- Ineos Grenadiers
- Intermarché–Wanty–Gobert Matériaux
- Israel Start-Up Nation
- Movistar Team
- Team Jumbo–Visma
- Team Qhubeka NextHash
- Team DSM
- Trek–Segafredo
- UAE Team Emirates

UCI ProTeams

- Androni Giocattoli–Sidermec
- Arkéa–Samsic
- Bardiani–CSF–Faizanè
- Caja Rural–Seguros RGA
- Eolo–Kometa
- Euskaltel–Euskadi
- Gazprom–RusVelo
- Vini Zabù

== Result ==
Result
Rank	Rider	Team	Time
1	Primož Roglič (SLO)	Team Jumbo–Visma	4h 17' 41"
2	Adam Yates (GBR)	Ineos Grenadiers	+ 12"
3	João Almeida (POR)	Deceuninck–Quick-Step	+ 35"
4	Tadej Pogačar (SLO)	UAE Team Emirates	+ 35"
5	Michael Woods (CAN)	Israel Start-Up Nation	+ 48"
6	David Gaudu (FRA)	Groupama–FDJ	+ 48"
7	Diego Ulissi (ITA)	UAE Team Emirates	+ 48"
8	Fausto Masnada (ITA)	Deceuninck–Quick-Step	+ 48"
9	Nairo Quintana (COL)	Arkéa–Samsic	+ 48"
10	Alejandro Valverde (ESP)	Movistar Team	+ 56"
