= 2019 Giro dell'Emilia =

2019 UCI Europe Tour

Race details
- Dates: 5 October 2019
- Stages: 1
- Distance: 207.4 km (128.9 mi)
- Winning time: 5h 08' 08"

Results
	Winner	Primož Roglič (SLO)	(Team Jumbo–Visma)
	Second	Michael Woods (CAN)	(EF Education First)
	Third	Sergio Higuita (COL)	(EF Education First)

The 2019 Giro dell'Emilia was the 102nd edition of the Giro dell'Emilia road cycling one day race. It was held on 5 October 2019 as part of the 2019 UCI Europe Tour as a 1.HC-ranked event. It was won by Slovenian rider Primož Roglič of Team Jumbo–Visma.

== Teams ==
Twenty-five teams were invited in the race, of which eleven are UCI WorldTour teams, eight are UCI Professional Continental teams, and six are UCI Continental teams. Each team entered seven riders, though eight teams (Amore & Vita–Prodir, Astana, Bardiani–CSF, Biesse–Carrera, Mitchelton–Scott, Sangemini–MG.K Vis, Team Colpack, and Team INEOS) only entered six riders, and Giotti Victoria–Palomar only entered five.

UCI WorldTeams

- AG2R La Mondiale
- Astana
- Bahrain–Merida
- EF Education First
- Groupama–FDJ
- Mitchelton–Scott
- Movistar Team
- Team INEOS
- Team Jumbo–Visma
- Trek–Segafredo
- UAE Team Emirates

UCI Professional Continental Teams

- Androni Giocattoli–Sidermec
- Arkéa–Samsic
- Bardiani–CSF
- Caja Rural–Seguros RGA
- Gazprom–RusVelo
- Neri Sottoli–Selle Italia–KTM
- Nippo–Vini Fantini–Faizanè
- Wanty–Gobert

UCI Continental Teams

- Amore & Vita–Prodir
- Biesse–Carrera
- Giotti Victoria–Palomar
- Sangemini–MG.K Vis
- Team Beltrami TSA–Hopplà–Petroli Firenze
- Team Colpack

== Results ==
Result
Rank	Rider	Team	Time
1	Primož Roglič (SLO)	Team Jumbo–Visma	5h 08' 08"
2	Michael Woods (CAN)	EF Education First	+ 15"
3	Sergio Higuita (COL)	EF Education First	+ 15"
4	Bauke Mollema (NED)	Trek–Segafredo	+ 17"
5	Alejandro Valverde (ESP)	Movistar Team	+ 17"
6	Diego Ulissi (ITA)	UAE Team Emirates	+ 21"
7	Pierre Latour (FRA)	AG2R La Mondiale	+ 24"
8	Jakob Fuglsang (DEN)	Astana	+ 24"
9	Egan Bernal (COL)	Team INEOS	+ 28"
10	Gianluca Brambilla (ITA)	Trek–Segafredo	+ 32"
