= Clássica Loulé =

Portuguese one-day road cycling race

Race details
- Date: March
- Region: Portugal
- Discipline: Road
- Type: One day race

History
- First edition: 2015
- Editions: 1 (as of 2015)
- First winner: Michael Woods (CAN)
- Most recent: Michael Woods (CAN)

Clássica Loulé is a men's one-day cycle race which takes place in Portugal. It was rated by the UCI as 1.2 and forms part of the UCI Europe Tour.

== Overall winners ==
Year	Winner	Team
2015	(Canada) Michael Woods	Optum-Kelly Benefit Strategies
