= 2023 Giro dell'Emilia =

2023 UCI ProSeries
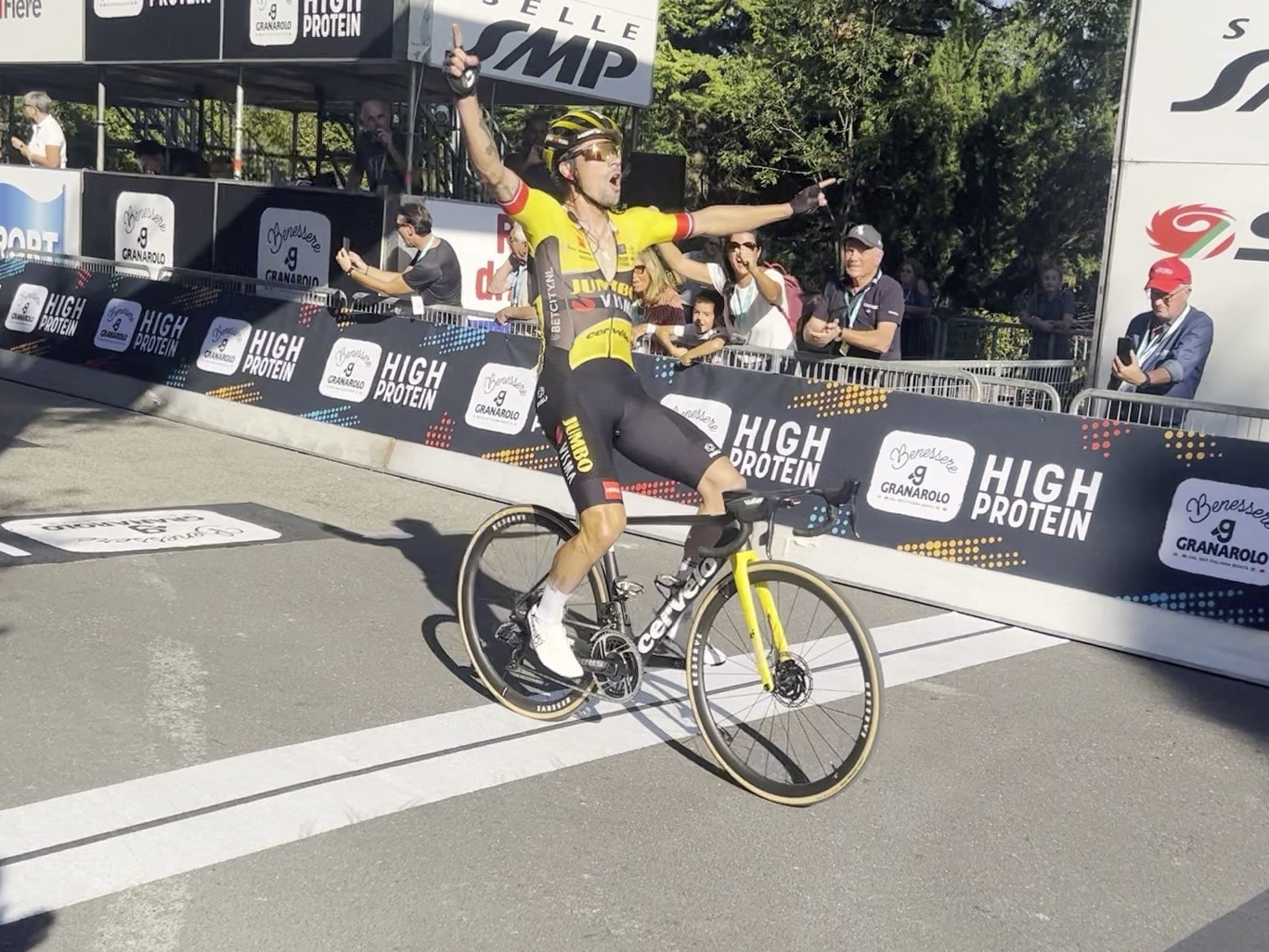
- Primož Roglič crossing the finish line

Race details
- Dates: 30 September 2023
- Stages: 1
- Distance: 204.1 km (126.8 mi)
- Winning time: 4h 49' 44"

Results
	Winner	Primož Roglič (SLO)	(Team Jumbo–Visma)
	Second	Tadej Pogačar (SLO)	(UAE Team Emirates)
	Third	Simon Yates (GBR)	(Team Jayco–AlUla)

The 2023 Giro dell'Emilia was the 106th edition of the Giro dell'Emilia road cycling one day race in the titular region of central Italy. It was held on 30 September 2023 as part of the 2023 UCI ProSeries.

== Teams ==
16 of the 18 UCI WorldTeams and six UCI ProTeams, and three UCI Continental teams made up the 25 teams that participated in the race.

UCI WorldTeams

- Movistar Team
- AG2R Citroën Team
- Alpecin–Deceuninck
- Astana Qazaqstan Team
- Bora–Hansgrohe
- Cofidis
- EF Education–EasyPost
- Groupama–FDJ
- Ineos Grenadiers
- Team Jumbo–Visma
- Lidl–Trek
- Soudal–Quick-Step
- Arkéa–Samsic
- Team dsm–firmenich
- Team Jayco–AlUla
- UAE Team Emirates

UCI ProTeams

- Bingoal WB
- Team Corratec–Selle Italia
- Eolo–Kometa
- Green Project–Bardiani–CSF–Faizanè
- Israel–Premier Tech
- Q36.5 Pro Cycling Team

UCI Continental Teams

- Beltrami TSA–Tre Colli
- GW Shimano–Sidermec
- Team Technipes #inEmiliaRomagna

== Result ==
Result
Rank	Rider	Team	Time
1	Primož Roglič (SLO)	Team Jumbo–Visma	4h 49' 44"
2	Tadej Pogačar (SLO)	UAE Team Emirates	+ 1"
3	Simon Yates (GBR)	Team Jayco–AlUla	+ 1"
4	Enric Mas (ESP)	Movistar Team	+ 4"
5	Michael Woods (CAN)	Israel–Premier Tech	+ 4"
6	Aleksandr Vlasov	Bora–Hansgrohe	+ 6"
7	Richard Carapaz (ECU)	EF Education–EasyPost	+ 9"
8	Giulio Ciccone (ITA)	Lidl–Trek	+ 15"
9	Adam Yates (GBR)	UAE Team Emirates	+ 42"
10	Warren Barguil (FRA)	Arkéa–Samsic	+ 58"
