= 2023 Il Lombardia =

Cycling race

2023 UCI World Tour, race 34 of 35
- Official event poster

Race details
- Dates: 7 October 2023
- Stages: 1
- Distance: 238 km (148 mi)
- Winning time: 5h 55' 33"

Results
| | Winner | Tadej Pogačar (SLO) | (UAE Team Emirates) |
| | Second | Andrea Bagioli (ITA) | (Soudal–Quick-Step) |
| | Third | Primož Roglič (SLO) | (Team Jumbo–Visma) |

The 2023 Il Lombardia was a one-day road cycling race that took place on 7 October 2023 in the Italian region of Lombardy. It was the 34th event of the 2023 UCI World Tour and was the 117th edition of Il Lombardia. The race was won by Tadej Pogačar with a 32 kilometer solo after an attack on the descent of Passo di Ganda, marking his third consecutive victory in the race.

== Teams ==
Twenty-five teams, consisting of 18 UCI WorldTeams and seven UCI ProTeams, participated in the race. Each team entered seven riders.

UCI WorldTeams

- AG2R Citroën Team
- Alpecin–Deceuninck
- Arkéa–Samsic
- Astana Qazaqstan Team
- Bora–Hansgrohe
- Cofidis
- EF Education–EasyPost
- Groupama–FDJ
- INEOS Grenadiers
- Intermarché–Circus–Wanty
- Movistar Team
- Soudal–Quick-Step
- Team Bahrain Victorious
- Team Jayco–AlUla
- Team dsm–firmenich
- Team Jumbo–Visma
- Trek–Segafredo
- UAE Team Emirates

UCI ProTeams

- Eolo–Kometa
- Green Project–Bardiani–CSF–Faizanè
- Israel–Premier Tech
- Lotto–Dstny
- Q36.5 Pro Cycling Team
- Team TotalEnergies
- Tudor Pro Cycling Team

== Results ==
Result
| Rank | Rider | Team | Time |
|---|---|---|---|
| 1 | Tadej Pogačar (SLO) | UAE Team Emirates | 5h 55' 33" |
| 2 | Andrea Bagioli (ITA) | Soudal–Quick-Step | + 52" |
| 3 | Primož Roglič (SLO) | Team Jumbo–Visma | + 52" |
| 4 | Aleksandr Vlasov | Bora–Hansgrohe | + 52" |
| 5 | Simon Yates (GBR) | Team Jayco–AlUla | + 52" |
| 6 | Adam Yates (GBR) | UAE Team Emirates | + 52" |
| 7 | Carlos Rodríguez (ESP) | INEOS Grenadiers | + 52" |
| 8 | Richard Carapaz (ECU) | EF Education–EasyPost | + 1' 06" |
| 9 | Remco Evenepoel (BEL) | Soudal–Quick-Step | + 1' 26" |
| 10 | Andreas Kron (DEN) | Lotto–Dstny | + 1' 26" |
