= 2020 Liège–Bastogne–Liège =

Cycling race

2020 UCI World Tour, race 17 of 21

Race details
- Dates: 4 October 2020
- Stages: 1
- Distance: 257 km (160 mi)
- Winning time: 6h 32' 02"

Results
	Winner	Primož Roglič (SLO)	(Team Jumbo–Visma)
	Second	Marc Hirschi (SUI)	(Team Sunweb)
	Third	Tadej Pogačar (SLO)	(UAE Team Emirates)

The 2020 Liège–Bastogne–Liège was a Belgian road cycling one-day race that was originally scheduled for 26 April 2020. Due to the COVID-19 pandemic, it was rescheduled to 4 October, and it was the 106th edition of Liège–Bastogne–Liège and part of the 2020 UCI World Tour.

The race was won by Primož Roglič in a tumultuous sprint amongst a group of five riders, beating world champion Julian Alaphilippe, who already had put his hands in the air, in a photo finish. Alaphilippe, however, was later relegated to fifth place for hindering Marc Hirschi in the sprint. This moved Hirschi up into second, while 2020 Tour de France winner Tadej Pogačar was moved up into third.

== Teams ==
All nineteen UCI WorldTeams and six UCI ProTeams made up the twenty-five teams of seven riders each that participated in the race. 125 of the 175 riders in the race finished.

UCI WorldTeams

- AG2R La Mondiale
- Astana
- Bahrain–McLaren
- Bora–Hansgrohe
- CCC Team
- Cofidis
- Deceuninck–Quick-Step
- EF Pro Cycling
- Groupama–FDJ
- Israel Start-Up Nation
- Lotto–Soudal
- Mitchelton–Scott
- Movistar Team
- NTT Pro Cycling
- INEOS Grenadiers
- Team Jumbo–Visma
- Team Sunweb
- Trek–Segafredo
- UAE Team Emirates

UCI Professional Continental teams

- Alpecin–Fenix
- Arkéa–Samsic
- Bingoal–Wallonie Bruxelles
- Circus–Wanty Gobert
- Sport Vlaanderen–Baloise
- Total Direct Énergie

== Result ==
Result
Rank	Rider	Team	Time
1	Primož Roglič (SLO)	Team Jumbo–Visma	6h 32' 02"
2	Marc Hirschi (SUI)	Team Sunweb	+ 0"
3	Tadej Pogačar (SLO)	UAE Team Emirates	+ 0"
4	Matej Mohorič (SLO)	Bahrain–McLaren	+ 0"
5	Julian Alaphilippe (FRA)	Deceuninck–Quick-Step	+ 0"
6	Mathieu van der Poel (NED)	Alpecin–Fenix	+ 14"
7	Michael Woods (CAN)	EF Pro Cycling	+ 14"
8	Tiesj Benoot (BEL)	Team Sunweb	+ 14"
9	Warren Barguil (FRA)	Arkéa–Samsic	+ 14"
10	Michał Kwiatkowski (POL)	INEOS Grenadiers	+ 14"
