= 2018 Tre Valli Varesine =

2018 UCI Europe Tour

Race details
- Dates: 9 October 2018
- Stages: 1
- Distance: 203 km (126.1 mi)
- Winning time: 4h 55' 41"

Results
	Winner	Toms Skujiņš (LAT)	(Trek–Segafredo)
	Second	Thibaut Pinot (FRA)	(Groupama–FDJ)
	Third	Peter Kennaugh (GBR)	(Bora–Hansgrohe)

The 2018 Tre Valli Varesine was the 98th edition of the Tre Valli Varesine road cycling one day race. It was held on 9 October 2018 as part of the 2018 UCI Europe Tour in category 1.HC, over a distance of 203 km, starting in Saronno and ending in Varese.

The race was won by Toms Skujiņš of Trek–Segafredo.

== Teams ==
Twenty-five teams were invited to take part in the race. These included thirteen UCI WorldTeams, eight UCI Professional Continental teams and four UCI Continental teams.

UCI WorldTeams

- AG2R La Mondiale
- Astana
- Bahrain–Merida
- Bora–Hansgrohe
- EF Education First–Drapac p/b Cannondale
- Team Dimension Data
- Mitchelton–Scott
- Movistar Team
- LottoNL–Jumbo
- Team Sunweb
- Trek–Segafredo
- UAE Team Emirates
- Groupama–FDJ

UCI Professional Continental Teams

- Androni Giocattoli–Sidermec
- Bardiani–CSF
- Caja Rural–Seguros RGA
- Cofidis
- Gazprom–RusVelo
- Israel Cycling Academy
- Nippo–Vini Fantini–Europa Ovini
- Wilier Triestina–Selle Italia

UCI Continental Teams

- Amore & Vita–Prodir
- D'Amico Utensilnord
- Sangemini–MG.K Vis Vega
- Trevigiani Phonix–Hemus 1896

== Results ==
Result
Rank	Rider	Team	Time
1	Toms Skujiņš (LAT)	Trek–Segafredo	4h 55' 41"
2	Thibaut Pinot (FRA)	Groupama–FDJ	+ 0"
3	Peter Kennaugh (GBR)	Bora–Hansgrohe	+ 0"
4	Michael Woods (CAN)	EF Education First–Drapac p/b Cannondale	+ 0"
5	Mathias Frank (SUI)	AG2R La Mondiale	+ 0"
6	Wilco Kelderman (NED)	Team Sunweb	+ 0"
7	Rigoberto Urán (COL)	EF Education First–Drapac p/b Cannondale	+ 4"
8	Julien Simon (FRA)	Cofidis	+ 13"
9	Giovanni Visconti (ITA)	Bahrain–Merida	+ 13"
10	Gianluca Brambilla (ITA)	Trek–Segafredo	+ 13"
