= 2019 Tre Valli Varesine =

2019 UCI Europe Tour

Race details
- Dates: 8 October 2019
- Stages: 1
- Distance: 197.8 km (122.9 mi)
- Winning time: 4h 40' 46"

Results
	Winner	Primož Roglič (SLO)	(Team Jumbo–Visma)
	Second	Giovanni Visconti (ITA)	(Neri Sottoli–Selle Italia–KTM)
	Third	Toms Skujiņš (LAT)	(Trek–Segafredo)

The 2019 Tre Valli Varesine was the 99th edition of the Tre Valli Varesine road cycling one day race. It was held on 8 October 2019 as part of the 2019 UCI Europe Tour in category 1.HC, over a distance of 197.8 km, starting in Saronno and ending in Varese.

The race was won by Primož Roglič of Team Jumbo–Visma.

== Teams ==
Twenty-two teams were invited to take part in the race. These included fourteen UCI WorldTeams and eight UCI Professional Continental teams.

UCI WorldTeams

- AG2R La Mondiale
- Astana
- Bahrain–Merida
- Bora–Hansgrohe
- EF Education First
- Team Dimension Data
- Groupama–FDJ
- Lotto–Soudal
- Movistar Team
- Team Jumbo–Visma
- Team Sunweb
- Trek–Segafredo
- UAE Team Emirates
- Team Ineos

UCI Professional Continental Teams

- Androni Giocattoli–Sidermec
- Bardiani–CSF
- Caja Rural–Seguros RGA
- Cofidis
- Gazprom–RusVelo
- Israel Cycling Academy
- Nippo–Vini Fantini–Faizanè
- Neri Sottoli–Selle Italia–KTM

== Results ==
Result
Rank	Rider	Team	Time
1	Primož Roglič (SLO)	Team Jumbo–Visma	4h 40' 46"
2	Giovanni Visconti (ITA)	Neri Sottoli–Selle Italia–KTM	+ 3"
3	Toms Skujiņš (LAT)	Trek–Segafredo	+ 3"
4	Andrea Vendrame (ITA)	Androni Giocattoli–Sidermec	+ 3"
5	Sergio Higuita (COL)	EF Education First	+ 3"
6	Tiesj Benoot (BEL)	Lotto–Soudal	+ 3"
7	Kristian Sbaragli (ITA)	Israel Cycling Academy	+ 3"
8	Tao Geoghegan Hart (GBR)	Team Ineos	+ 3"
9	Damiano Caruso (ITA)	Bahrain–Merida	+ 3"
10	Tim Wellens (BEL)	Lotto–Soudal	+ 3"
