= 2021 Giro dell'Emilia =

- 2021 UCI Europe Tour; 2021 UCI ProSeries

Race details
- Dates: 2 October 2021
- Stages: 1
- Distance: 195.3 km (121.4 mi)
- Winning time: 4h 54' 26"

Results
	Winner	Primož Roglič (SLO)	(Team Jumbo–Visma)
	Second	João Almeida (POR)	(Deceuninck–Quick-Step)
	Third	Michael Woods (CAN)	(Israel Start-Up Nation)

The 2021 Giro dell'Emilia was the 104th edition of the Giro dell'Emilia road cycling one day race in the titular region of central Italy. It was held on 2 October 2021 as part of the 2021 UCI Europe Tour and the 2021 UCI ProSeries calendars.

The race's hilly route covered 195.3 kilometres (121.4 mi) in and around Bologna, starting from Casalecchio di Reno and finishing at the Sanctuary of the Madonna of San Luca. The first 150 kilometres (93 mi) of the race consisted of a large circuit around Bologna and featured two sprint points in Zola Predosa and Valsamoggia, followed by three climbs (Ca' Bortolani, Passo Brasa, and Medelana) and a third sprint point at the Parco dei Ciliegi. After summiting the 2.1-kilometre (1.3 mi) San Luca hill, which had an average gradient of 9.4 percent, riders then took on four laps of a 9.3-kilometre (5.8 mi) circuit. Each lap began with a short descent from the sanctuary and a short climb to Montalbano, before a descent into Bologna and the climb back up to San Luca.

== Teams ==
14 of the 19 UCI WorldTeams, seven UCI ProTeams, and four UCI Continental teams made up the 25 teams that participated in the race. 14 teams entered a full squad of seven riders, while a further nine teams only entered six riders. The remaining two teams, Eolo–Kometa and Team BikeExchange, only entered five riders. In total, 162 riders started the race, of which only 55 finished.

UCI WorldTeams

- AG2R Citroën Team
- Astana–Premier Tech
- Bora–Hansgrohe
- Deceuninck–Quick-Step
- EF Education–Nippo
- Groupama–FDJ
- Ineos Grenadiers
- Israel Start-Up Nation
- Lotto–Soudal
- Team BikeExchange
- Team Jumbo–Visma
- Team Qhubeka NextHash
- Trek–Segafredo
- UAE Team Emirates

UCI ProTeams

- Androni Giocattoli–Sidermec
- Arkéa–Samsic
- Bardiani–CSF–Faizanè
- Eolo–Kometa
- Gazprom–RusVelo
- Team TotalEnergies
- Vini Zabù

UCI Continental Teams

- Beltrami TSA–Tre Colli
- General Store–Fratelli Curia–Essegibi
- MG.K Vis VPM
- Work Service–Marchiol–Vega

== Result ==
Result
Rank	Rider	Team	Time
1	Primož Roglič (SLO)	Team Jumbo–Visma	4h 54' 26"
2	João Almeida (POR)	Deceuninck–Quick-Step	+ 3"
3	Michael Woods (CAN)	Israel Start-Up Nation	+ 5"
4	Adam Yates (GBR)	Ineos Grenadiers	+ 10"
5	Remco Evenepoel (BEL)	Deceuninck–Quick-Step	+ 28"
6	Dan Martin (IRL)	Israel Start-Up Nation	+ 1' 23"
7	Bauke Mollema (NED)	Trek–Segafredo	+ 1' 45"
8	Diego Ulissi (ITA)	UAE Team Emirates	+ 1' 46"
9	Ben Hermans (BEL)	Israel Start-Up Nation	+ 1' 50"
10	Nairo Quintana (COL)	Arkéa–Samsic	+ 1' 59"
