= 2016 Giro dell'Emilia =

2016 UCI Europe Tour

Race details
- Dates: 24 September 2016
- Stages: 1
- Distance: 213 km (132.4 mi)
- Winning time: 5h 07' 28"

Results
	Winner	Esteban Chaves (COL)	(Orica–BikeExchange)
	Second	Romain Bardet (FRA)	(AG2R La Mondiale)
	Third	Rigoberto Urán (COL)	(Cannondale–Drapac)

The 2016 Giro dell'Emilia was the 99th edition of the Giro dell'Emilia road cycling one day race. It was held on 24 September 2016 as part of the 2016 UCI Europe Tour in category 1.HC, over a distance of 213 km, starting in Bologna and ending in Madonna di San Luca, Bologna.

The race was won by Esteban Chaves of Orica–BikeExchange.

== Teams ==
Twenty-five teams were invited to take part in the race. These included ten UCI WorldTeams, thirteen UCI Professional Continental teams and two UCI Continental teams.

UCI WorldTeams

- AG2R La Mondiale
- Astana
- BMC Racing Team
- Team Dimension Data
- FDJ
- Lampre–Merida
- Movistar Team
- Trek–Segafredo
- Cannondale–Drapac
- Orica–BikeExchange

UCI Professional Continental Teams

- Androni Giocattoli–Sidermec
- Bardiani–CSF
- Bora–Argon 18
- Caja Rural–Seguros RGA
- CCC–Sprandi–Polkowice
- Cofidis
- Delko–Marseille Provence KTM
- Fortuneo–Vital Concept
- Gazprom–RusVelo
- Nippo–Vini Fantini
- Topsport Vlaanderen–Baloise
- Wanty–Groupe Gobert
- Wilier Triestina–Southeast

UCI Continental Teams

- GM Europa Ovini
- Unieuro–Wilier

== Results ==
Result
Rank	Rider	Team	Time
1	Esteban Chaves (COL)	Orica–BikeExchange	5h 07' 29"
2	Romain Bardet (FRA)	AG2R La Mondiale	+ 3"
3	Rigoberto Urán (COL)	Cannondale–Drapac	+ 3"
4	Fabio Aru (ITA)	Astana	+ 3"
5	Jan Bakelants (BEL)	AG2R La Mondiale	+ 10"
6	Rodolfo Torres (COL)	Androni Giocattoli–Sidermec	+ 10"
7	Jonathan Hivert (FRA)	Fortuneo–Vital Concept	+ 11"
8	Diego Ulissi (ITA)	Lampre–Merida	+ 14"
9	Davide Villella (ITA)	Cannondale–Drapac	+ 14"
10	Igor Antón (ESP)	Team Dimension Data	+ 14"
