= Giro dell'Emilia =

Italian one-day road cycling race

Race details
- Date: Early-October
- Region: Emilia, Italy
- English name: Tour of Emilia
- Local name: Giro dell'Emilia (in Italian)
- Discipline: Road
- Competition: UCI ProSeries
- Type: Single-day
- Web site: www.gsemilia.it

History
- First edition: 1909
- Editions: 109 (as of 2026)
- First winner: Eberardo Pavesi (ITA)
- Most wins: Costante Girardengo (ITA) (5 wins)
- Most recent: Davide Piganzoli (ITA)

The Giro dell'Emilia is a late season road bicycle race held annually in Bologna, Emilia-Romagna, Italy. First run in 1909, the race is considered a classic cycle race, and is traditionally grouped with the Giro del Piemonte and Giro di Lombardia as part of the Italian autumn classics.

The race begins and ends in Bologna, incorporating a tour through the Appennino Tosco-Emiliano National Park. The finale consists of five circuits featuring the ascent to the Sanctuary of the Madonna di San Luca, with each circuit including the Orfanelle climb, Montalbano climb, and Casaglia descent.

The race held UCI Europe Tour 1.HC classification from 2005 through 2019. In 2020, it was elevated to the UCI ProSeries calendar. Since 2014, there has also been a women's race of the same name.

As one of the oldest cycling classics still running, the race is considered prestigious by riders and media, and often features a strong startlist of riders. Previous champions included legendary riders like Coppi, Bartali, Merckx, Roglič and Pogačar.

== Winners ==
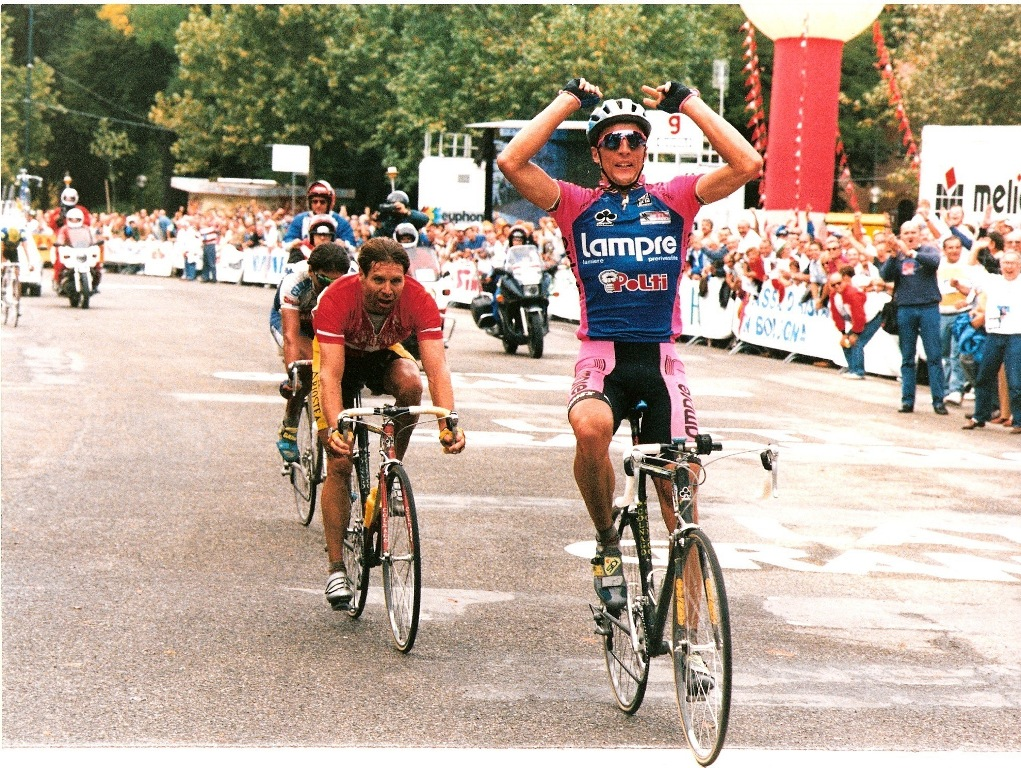
Maurizio Fondriest winning the 1993 edition ahead of Pascal Richard

Updated through 2026 edition.

Year	Country	Rider	Team
1909	Italy	Eberardo Pavesi	Atala–Dunlop
1910	Italy	Luigi Ganna	Atala–Continental
1911	Italy	Clemente Canepari	Legnano
1912	Italy	Ugo Agostoni	Peugeot–Wolber
1913	Italy	Alfonso Calzolari	Atala
1914	Italy	Ezio Corlaita	Peugeot–Wolber
1915; 1916	No race		
1917	Italy	Angelo Gremo	Bianchi
1918	Italy	Costante Girardengo	Bianchi
1919	Italy	Costante Girardengo	Stucchi–Dunlop
1920	Italy	Giovanni Brunero	Legnano–Pirelli
1921	Italy	Costante Girardengo	Stucchi-Pirelli
1922	Italy	Costante Girardengo	Bianchi
1923	Italy	Michele Gordini	Ganna
1924	Italy	Pietro Linari	Legnano–Pirelli
1925	Italy	Costante Girardengo	Wolsit–Pirelli
1926	No race		
1927	Italy	Domenico Piemontesi	Bianchi–Pirelli
1928	Italy	Alfonso Piccin	Bianchi–Pirelli
1929	Italy	Allegro Grandi	Bianchi–Pirelli
1930	Italy	Mario Bonetti	???
1931	Italy	Glauco Servadei	individual
1932; 1933	No race		
1934	Italy	Marco Cimatti	individual
1935	Italy	Aldo Bini	Maino–Girardengo
1936	Italy	Giuseppe Olmo	Bianchi
1937	Italy	Cesare Del Cancia	Ganna
1938	Italy	Corrado Ardizzoni	individual
1939	No race		
1940	Italy	Osvaldo Bailo	Gerbi
1941	Italy	Fausto Coppi	Legnano
1942	Italy	Adolfo Leoni	Bianchi
1943	Italy	Nedo Logli	individual
1944; 1945	No race		
1946	Italy	Adolfo Leoni	Bianchi
1947	Italy	Fausto Coppi	Bianchi
1948	Italy	Fausto Coppi	Bianchi
1949	Italy	Virgilio Salimbeni	Legnano–Pirelli
1950	Italy	Luciano Maggini	Taurea–Pirelli
1951	Italy	Luciano Maggini	Atala–Pirelli
1952	Italy	Gino Bartali	Bartali–Ursus
1953	Italy	Gino Bartali	Bartali
1954	Italy	Nino Defilippis	Torpado–Ursus
1955	Italy	Nino Defilippis	Torpado–Ursus
1956	Italy	Bruno Monti	Atala–Pirelli
1957	Italy	Bruno Monti	Atala
1958	Italy	Diego Ronchini	Bianchi–Pirelli
1959	Italy	Ercole Baldini	Ignis–Fréjus
1960	Italy	Pierino Baffi	Ignis
1961	Italy	Diego Ronchini	Carpano
1962	Italy	Bruno Mealli	Bianchi
1963	Italy	Italo Zilioli	Carpano
1964	No race		
1965	Italy	Michele Dancelli	Molteni
1966	Italy	Carmine Preziosi	Bianchi-Mobylette
1967	Italy	Michele Dancelli	Vittadello
1968	Italy	Gianni Motta	Molteni
1969	Italy	Gianni Motta	Sanson
1970	Italy	Franco Bitossi	Filotex
1971	Italy	Gianni Motta	Salvarani
1972	Belgium	Eddy Merckx	Molteni
1973	Italy	Franco Bitossi	Sammontana
1974	Italy	Francesco Moser	Filotex
1975	Italy	Enrico Paolini	Scic
1976	Belgium	Roger De Vlaeminck	Brooklyn
1977	Italy	Mario Beccia	Sanson
1978	Sweden	Bernt Johansson	Fiorella–Mocassini
1979	Italy	Francesco Moser	Sanson–Luxor
1980	Italy	Gianbattista Baronchelli	Bianchi–Piaggio
1981	Italy	Pierino Gavazzi	Magniflex–Olmo
1982	Italy	Pierino Gavazzi	Atala–Campagnolo
1983	Italy	Cesare Cipollini	Dromedario
1984	Italy	Ezio Moroni	Atala–Campagnolo
1985	Portugal	Acácio da Silva	Malvor–Bottecchia
1986	Switzerland	Hubert Seiz	Supermercati Brianzoli
1987	France	Jean-François Bernard	Toshiba–Look
1988	Switzerland	Tony Rominger	Château d'Ax
1989	Soviet Union	Dimitri Konishev	Alfa Lum–STM
1990	Italy	Davide Cassani	Ariostea
1991	Italy	Davide Cassani	Ariostea
1992	Italy	Gianni Bugno	Gatorade–Château d'Ax
1993	Italy	Maurizio Fondriest	Lampre–Polti
1994	Italy	Francesco Casagrande	Mercatone Uno–Medeghini
1995	Italy	Davide Cassani	MG Maglificio–Technogym
1996	Italy	Michele Bartoli	MG Maglificio–Technogym
1997	Russia	Alexandre Gontchenkov	Roslotto–ZG Mobili
1998	Italy	Mirko Celestino	Team Polti
1999	Netherlands	Michael Boogerd	Rabobank
2000	Italy	Gilberto Simoni	Lampre–Daikin
2001	Germany	Jan Ullrich	Team Telekom
2002	Italy	Michele Bartoli	Fassa Bortolo
2003	Spain	Iván Gutiérrez	iBanesto.com
2004	Italy	Ivan Basso	Team CSC
2005	Italy	Gilberto Simoni	Lampre–Caffita
2006	Italy	Davide Rebellin	Gerolsteiner
2007	Luxembourg	Fränk Schleck	Team CSC
2008	Italy	Danilo Di Luca	LPR Brakes–Ballan
2009	Netherlands	Robert Gesink	Rabobank
2010	Netherlands	Robert Gesink	Rabobank
2011	Colombia	Carlos Betancur	Acqua & Sapone
2012	Colombia	Nairo Quintana	Movistar Team
2013	Italy	Diego Ulissi	Lampre–Merida
2014	Italy	Davide Rebellin	CCC–Polsat–Polkowice
2015	Belgium	Jan Bakelants	AG2R La Mondiale
2016	Colombia	Esteban Chaves	Orica–BikeExchange
2017	Italy	Giovanni Visconti	Bahrain–Merida
2018	Italy	Alessandro De Marchi	BMC Racing Team
2019	Slovenia	Primož Roglič	Team Jumbo–Visma
2020	Russia	Aleksandr Vlasov	Astana
2021	Slovenia	Primož Roglič	Team Jumbo–Visma
2022	Spain	Enric Mas	Movistar Team
2023	Slovenia	Primož Roglič	Team Jumbo–Visma
2024	Slovenia	Tadej Pogačar	UAE Team Emirates
2025	Mexico	Isaac del Toro	UAE Team Emirates XRG
2026	Italy	Davide Piganzoli	Visma–Lease a Bike

== Wins per country ==
Wins	Country
83	Italy
4	Slovenia
3	Belgium
3	Netherlands
3	Colombia
2	Switzerland
2	Russia
2	Spain
1	Sweden; Portugal; France; Soviet Union; Germany; Luxembourg; Mexico
