= 2016 Tour of the Basque Country =

2016 UCI World Tour, race 9 of 28

Race details
- Dates: 4–9 April 2016
- Stages: 6
- Distance: 852.2 km (529.5 mi)

Results
Jersey awarded to the overall winner	Winner	Alberto Contador (ESP)	(Tinkoff)
	Second	Sergio Henao (COL)	(Team Sky)
	Third	Nairo Quintana (COL)	(Movistar Team)
Jersey awarded to the points classification winner	Points	Sergio Henao (COL)	(Team Sky)
Jersey awarded to the mountains classification winner	Mountains	Diego Rosa (ITA)	(Astana)
Jersey awarded to the sprints classification winner	Sprints	Nicolas Edet (FRA)	(Cofidis)
	Team	Team Sky	

The 2016 Tour of the Basque Country (Spanish: Vuelta al Pais Vasco, Basque: Euskal Herriko itzulia) was a road cycling stage race that took place in the Basque Country between 4 and 9 April 2016. It was the 56th edition of the Tour of the Basque Country and the ninth event of the 2016 UCI World Tour.

The race took place over mountainous terrain and was suitable for climbers. The first five stages were mountainous; the sixth and final stage was a hilly individual time trial. The defending champion was Joaquim Rodríguez (Team Katusha), with Nairo Quintana (Movistar Team), Alberto Contador (Tinkoff) and Sergio Henao (Team Sky) also among the favourites for the overall victory.

Luis León Sánchez won the opening stage, but lost the lead the following day on the first uphill finish to Mikel Landa (Sky). Landa lost the lead on Stage 4, with Wilco Kelderman (LottoNL–Jumbo) taking over the lead. On the second uphill finish of the race on the penultimate day, Henao took over the lead after escaping with Contador. Contador then won the time trial on the final stage and beat Henao to the overall victory by 12 seconds, with Quintana a further 23 seconds behind in third. Henao won the points classification, while Nicolas Edet (Cofidis) won the intermediate sprints competition and Diego Rosa (Astana) the mountains classification.

== Route ==
The route of the 2016 Tour of the Basque Country was generally mountainous, with no stages suited for the sprinters. The first stage included eight categorised climbs, the last of which was 8.3 kilometres (5.2 mi) from the finish. The second finished with a 2-kilometre (1.2 mi) climb at an average gradient of 11.7%; the third and fourth stages again contained multiple climbs shortly before the finish. The fifth stage was the most difficult, with the 5.5-kilometre (3.4 mi) climb of the Arrate (referred to by its Basque name Usartza and averaging 8.5%), shortly before the finish. The final stage was a hilly individual time trial around Eibar.

Stage schedule
Stage	Date	Route	Distance	Type	Winner
1	4 April	Etxebarria to Markina-Xemein	144 km (89 mi)	Medium-mountain stage	Luis León Sánchez (ESP)
2	5 April	Markina-Xemein to Baranbio-Garrastatxu (Amurrio)	174.2 km (108 mi)	Mountain stage	Mikel Landa (ESP)
3	6 April	Vitoria-Gasteiz to Lesaka	193.5 km (120 mi)	Medium-mountain stage	Steve Cummings (GBR)
4	7 April	Lesaka to Orio	165 km (103 mi)	Medium-mountain stage	Samuel Sánchez (ESP)
5	8 April	Orio to Arrate (Eibar)	159 km (99 mi)	Mountain stage	Diego Rosa (ITA)
6	9 April	Eibar to Eibar	16.5 km (10 mi)	Individual time trial	Alberto Contador (ESP)

== Participating teams ==
As the Tour of the Basque Country is a UCI World Tour event, all eighteen UCI WorldTeams were invited automatically and were obliged to enter a team in the race. Two UCI Professional Continental teams – Cofidis and Caja Rural–Seguros RGA – were awarded wildcard places, bringing the number of teams to twenty. As each team included eight riders, there were a total of 160 at the start of the first stage.

UCI WorldTeams

- AG2R La Mondiale
- Astana
- BMC Racing Team
- Etixx–Quick-Step
- FDJ
- IAM Cycling
- Lampre–Merida
- Lotto–Soudal
- Movistar Team
- Team Giant–Alpecin
- Team Katusha
- LottoNL–Jumbo
- Team Dimension Data
- Team Sky
- Tinkoff
- Trek–Segafredo
- Orica–GreenEDGE
- Cannondale

UCI Professional Continental teams

- Cofidis
- Caja Rural–Seguros RGA

== Pre-race favourites ==
The mountainous terrain meant that the favourites for victory were exclusively climbers; every stage offered the opportunity for attacks. The final two stages (the climb to Arrate and the individual time trial) were expected to be decisive. The top two riders from the 2015 edition, Joaquim Rodríguez (Team Katusha) and Sergio Henao (Team Sky), both returned to the race. Rodríguez had not been in good form and had not been in the top ten at any race in 2016. Henao had been expected to ride in support of his team's new signing Mikel Landa, but Landa had been ill and was not yet in good form; Henao was therefore his team's leader. The principal favourites, however, were Nairo Quintana (Movistar Team) and Alberto Contador (Tinkoff); both men are former winners of the race (Quintana in 2013 and Contador in 2008, 2009 and 2014). Quintana had beaten Contador the previous month at the Volta a Catalunya. Other favourites included Dan Martin (Etixx–Quick-Step) and Fabio Aru (Astana), along with Thibaut Pinot (FDJ), who had won the Critérium International.

== Stages ==
=== Stage 1 ===
Profile of Stage 1

4 April – Etxebarria to Markina-Xemein, 144 km (89 mi)

The first stage took place over a 144-kilometre (89 mi) course that started in Etxebarria and followed a looping course to finish near the start in Markina-Xemein. The stage began with two third-category climbs, followed by a flat section along the coast, before turning back inland for two second-category climbs; there were then two more third-category climbs. The most difficult climb of the day was the first-category Alto de Ixua (6.2 kilometres (3.9 mi) at 7%); at the summit there were 26 kilometres (16 mi) remaining. This included one more second-category climb – the eighth of the day – and a final 8-kilometre (5.0 mi) descent to the finish, which came on flat, straight roads.

The day's main breakaway formed after the first climb. It was made up of Gianluca Brambilla (Etixx–Quick-Step), Marcel Wyss (IAM Cycling), Nicolas Edet (Cofidis) and Jonathan Lastra (Caja Rural–Seguros RGA). Brambilla fell back from the break before the third climb of the day, where the lead over the peloton was around three minutes. The peloton was led throughout by riders from Tinkoff and from Orica–GreenEDGE and was just over a minute 42 kilometres (26 mi) from the end.

Wyss was dropped on the Alto de Ixua, with 35 kilometres (22 mi) remaining, and the lead dropped to less than half a minute. The peloton's chase slowed on the climb, however, and Dario Cataldo was able to attack and come across to the breakaway; he immediately dropped Lastra and, after working with Edet for a while, dropped him too and continued alone. Meanwhile, there were attacks in the peloton, with Philip Deignan (Team Sky) and Wilco Kelderman (LottoNL–Jumbo) both attempting to escape. Towards the top of the climb, Alberto Contador attacked and was followed by the other general classification favourites; this acceleration brought Cataldo back to the group. On the final climb, Daniel Navarro (Cofidis) attacked and was joined by Luis León Sánchez (Astana). Sánchez led Navarro down the fast descent; they held a small lead going into the final kilometres. Sánchez sprinted first and Navarro was unable to come past. The main group were very close at the finish, with Simon Gerrans (Orica–GreenEDGE) sprinting into third place. Sánchez therefore took the overall lead of the race, with 50 other riders on the same time.

Result of Stage 1
Rank	Rider	Team	Time
1	Luis León Sánchez (ESP)	Astana	3h 54' 21"
2	Daniel Navarro (ESP)	Cofidis	+ 0"
3	Simon Gerrans (AUS)	Orica–GreenEDGE	+ 0"
4	Fabio Felline (ITA)	Trek–Segafredo	+ 0"
5	Simon Clarke (AUS)	Cannondale	+ 0"
6	Jan Bakelants (BEL)	AG2R La Mondiale	+ 0"
7	Dan Martin (IRL)	Etixx–Quick-Step	+ 0"
8	Warren Barguil (FRA)	Team Giant–Alpecin	+ 0"
9	Tony Gallopin (FRA)	Lotto–Soudal	+ 0"
10	Sergey Chernetskiy (RUS)	Team Katusha	+ 0"

General classification after Stage 1
Rank	Rider	Team	Time
1	Luis León Sánchez (ESP)	Astana	3h 54' 21"
2	Daniel Navarro (ESP)	Cofidis	+ 0"
3	Simon Gerrans (AUS)	Orica–GreenEDGE	+ 0"
4	Fabio Felline (ITA)	Trek–Segafredo	+ 0"
5	Simon Clarke (AUS)	Cannondale	+ 0"
6	Jan Bakelants (BEL)	AG2R La Mondiale	+ 0"
7	Dan Martin (IRL)	Etixx–Quick-Step	+ 0"
8	Warren Barguil (FRA)	Team Giant–Alpecin	+ 0"
9	Tony Gallopin (FRA)	Lotto–Soudal	+ 0"
10	Sergey Chernetskiy (RUS)	Team Katusha	+ 0"

=== Stage 2 ===
Profile of Stage 2

4 April – Markina-Xemein to Baranbio-Garrastatxu (Amurrio), 174.2 km (108.2 mi)

The second stage started where the first had finished, in Markina-Xemein, and headed south-west towards the finish in Amurrio. It began with a second-category climb very early in the stage; after a flat section came two more climbs, one third-category and one second-category. After a long plateau and a descent, the riders arrived in Amurrio for the first time. Another third-category ascent followed; at the summit there were 47 kilometres (29 mi) to the finish. Most of this was over fairly flat roads as the riders looped around Amurrio, but the final part of the race was a steep climb, the 2.7-kilometre (1.7 mi) Alto de Garrastatxu, with an average gradient of 11.7%. The climb started with a section at 11.5%, followed by another at 13.5%; the final part of the climb had a gradient of 9.3%.

The first half of the stage took place in cold and rainy conditions. Nicholas Edet won the first mountain sprint, putting him into the lead of the mountain classification. A breakaway formed in the following kilometres, but the presence of two well-placed Lampre–Merida riders (Simone Petilli and Louis Meintjes) meant that the group was not allowed to build an advantage. Stefan Denifl (IAM Cycling) and Ángel Madrazo (Caja Rural–Seguros RGA) were part of this group and were then able to escape again, forming a two-man breakaway that led most of the stage. Their lead was over three minutes with 30 kilometres (19 mi) remaining, but fell rapidly; they were caught with 8 kilometres (5.0 mi) remaining.

Team Sky, along with Orica–GreenEDGE, Cannondale and Movistar, led the peloton towards the climb, with LottoNL–Jumbo taking over as the road began to rise. Blel Kadri (AG2R La Mondiale) then attacked, but was soon overtaken by Wilco Kelderman (LottoNL–Jumbo) and Mikel Landa (Sky). Going into the final kilometre, they had a 14-second lead. Contador, who had lost the key stage of the Volta a Catalunya after doing too much work on the final climb, waited for the other riders in the group to chase Landa and Kelderman. Rui Costa attempted to bring the two riders back, with Contador, Henao, Rodriguez and Samuel Sánchez (BMC Racing Team) following, but they were unable to catch them. In the final few hundred metres, Landa came past Kelderman and took the stage win, his first since signing for Team Sky. Keldeman was second, one second behind Landa, with Henao four seconds further back in third. Landa took over the race lead. After the stage, however, he said that Henao remained the team leader for the rest of the race and that he "could crack tomorrow".

Result of Stage 2
Rank	Rider	Team	Time
1	Mikel Landa (ESP)	Team Sky	4h 43' 17"
2	Wilco Kelderman (NED)	LottoNL–Jumbo	+ 1"
3	Sergio Henao (COL)	Team Sky	+ 5"
4	Samuel Sánchez (ESP)	BMC Racing Team	+ 9"
5	Alberto Contador (ESP)	Tinkoff	+ 11"
6	Thibaut Pinot (FRA)	FDJ	+ 13"
7	Rui Costa (POR)	Lampre–Merida	+ 15"
8	Nairo Quintana (COL)	Movistar Team	+ 15"
9	Robert Gesink (NED)	LottoNL–Jumbo	+ 15"
10	Sébastien Reichenbach (SUI)	FDJ	+ 15"

General classification after Stage 2
Rank	Rider	Team	Time
1	Mikel Landa (ESP)	Team Sky	8h 37' 38"
2	Wilco Kelderman (NED)	LottoNL–Jumbo	+ 1"
3	Sergio Henao (COL)	Team Sky	+ 5"
4	Samuel Sánchez (ESP)	BMC Racing Team	+ 9"
5	Alberto Contador (ESP)	Tinkoff	+ 11"
6	Thibaut Pinot (FRA)	FDJ	+ 13"
7	Rui Costa (POR)	Lampre–Merida	+ 15"
8	Nairo Quintana (COL)	Movistar Team	+ 15"
9	Robert Gesink (NED)	LottoNL–Jumbo	+ 15"
10	Sébastien Reichenbach (SUI)	FDJ	+ 15"

=== Stage 3 ===
Profile of Stage 3

6 April 2016 – Vitoria-Gasteiz to Lesaka, 193.5 km (120.2 mi)

The third stage covered a 193.5-kilometre (120.2 mi) route from Vitoria-Gasteiz to Lesaka. The route initially took the riders east along flat roads to Irurtzun, then north towards the coast. Shortly after the turn, there was a third-category climb followed immediately by a second-category climb. There were then flat roads as far as Hernani, when the riders turned east again, through Oiartzun. The final 35 kilometres (22 mi) included three second-category climbs. The last of these, the Alto de la Piedad, was crossed with 9.1 kilometres (5.7 mi) to the finish line. After the descent, there were flat roads to the finish.

There was an early breakaway formed by Blel Kadri (AG2R La Mondiale), Sam Oomen (Team Giant–Alpecin), José Gonçalves (Caja Rural–Seguros RGA), Daniel Teklehaimanot (Dimension Data) and, for the second consecutive day, Stefan Denifl (IAM). Gonçalves won the first mountain sprint and Denifl the second, but the group was kept close by the peloton; going into the three final climbs they had just a minute's lead. On the first of these climbs, Denifl attacked the breakaway, with only Oomen able to follow; meanwhile Michael Albasini (Orica–GreenEDGE) attacked from the peloton and was joined by Dario Cataldo (Astana), Daniel Navarro (Cofidis) and Laurens De Plus (Etixx–Quick-Step). Denifl was first to the summit of the day's third climb, with the four chasers around 30 seconds behind.

On the day's penultimate climb, the chasers were joined by Adam Yates (Orica–GreenEDGE) and Pierre Rolland (Cannondale); the whole group then came across to Denifl and Oomen. Denifl once again won the mountain sprint to take the lead in the mountain classification. As both Yates and Rolland were potential threats to Landa's general classification lead, Sky chased hard on the final climb, with the gap at around 15 seconds. Navarro attacked over the summit; Thibaut Pinot (FDJ) attacked from the peloton and was followed by Landa, Quintana, Samuel Sánchez and Rui Costa. Navarro rode the descent hard and had a small gap to the chasers at the foot, with a larger gap to the main peloton. Rolland and Yates attacked and caught Navarro; all the breakaway riders were finally caught with under 2 kilometres (1.2 mi) remaining.

Within the last 1 kilometre (0.6 mi), Steve Cummings (Team Dimension Data) attacked solo and held on to take the stage win. The peloton came close to catching him – with Simon Gerrans second and Fabio Felline (Trek–Segafredo) – but Cummings had time to celebrate as he crossed the line. Cummings's victory came just hours after he had said in an interview with Cyclingnews.com that he would attempt to win stages with late attacks; it was his second such victory of the year, after a stage of the Tirreno–Adriatico. Landa retained his overall lead, with no change in the top ten riders.

Result of Stage 3
Rank	Rider	Team	Time
1	Steve Cummings (GBR)	Team Dimension Data	5h 01' 57"
2	Simon Gerrans (AUS)	Orica–GreenEDGE	+ 0"
3	Fabio Felline (ITA)	Trek–Segafredo	+ 0"
4	Gianluca Brambilla (ITA)	Etixx–Quick-Step	+ 0"
5	Giovanni Visconti (ITA)	Movistar Team	+ 0"
6	Simon Clarke (AUS)	Cannondale	+ 0"
7	Tony Gallopin (FRA)	Lotto–Soudal	+ 0"
8	Pello Bilbao (ESP)	Caja Rural–Seguros RGA	+ 0"
9	Sergey Chernetskiy (RUS)	Team Katusha	+ 0"
10	Sergio Henao (COL)	Team Sky	+ 0"

General classification after Stage 3
Rank	Rider	Team	Time
1	Mikel Landa (ESP)	Team Sky	13h 39' 35"
2	Wilco Kelderman (NED)	LottoNL–Jumbo	+ 1"
3	Sergio Henao (COL)	Team Sky	+ 5"
4	Samuel Sánchez (ESP)	BMC Racing Team	+ 9"
5	Alberto Contador (ESP)	Tinkoff	+ 11"
6	Thibaut Pinot (FRA)	FDJ	+ 13"
7	Rui Costa (POR)	Lampre–Merida	+ 15"
8	Nairo Quintana (COL)	Movistar Team	+ 15"
9	Robert Gesink (NED)	LottoNL–Jumbo	+ 15"
10	Sébastien Reichenbach (SUI)	FDJ	+ 15"

=== Stage 4 ===
Profile of Stage 4

7 April 2016 – Lesaka to Orio, 165 km (103 mi)

The fourth stage of the race once again included several late climbs, coming at the end of a 165-kilometre (103 mi) course. The racing started in Lesaka, where Stage 3 had finished, and took the riders to Orio, travelling principally along the coast. There were two climbs in the first 50 kilometres (31 mi), one first-category and the other third-category. There was then a long section of flat roads before a second-category climb with 65 kilometres (40 mi) remaining. There were then three more second-category climbs in the final 35 kilometres (22 mi); the last two were ascents of different sides of the Alt de Aia, with the last summit coming 13 kilometres (8.1 mi) from the finish. After the final descent, there were 4 kilometres (2.5 mi) to the finish, which included an uncategorised climb of 1,000 metres (3,300 ft) at 7%.

The beginning part of the stage was raced hard; a large breakaway formed early and contested the early climbs. Denifl won the first two climbs, but the breakaway was caught and, after 80 kilometres (50 mi), a new breakaway was formed. This was made up of six riders: Simone Petilli (Lampre–Mérida), Tim Wellens (Lotto–Soudal), Christophe Riblon (AG2R La Mondiale), Luis Ángel Maté (Cofidis), Carlos Verona (Etixx–Quick-Step) and Ángel Vicioso (Katusha). The breakaway split on the fourth climb of the day, but re-formed on the descent. Team Sky held their advantage under three minutes for most of the stage and it was reduced further approaching the final climbs; it was around 90 seconds with 22 kilometres (14 mi) remaining.

On the penultimate climb of the day, Warren Barguil (Team Giant–Alpecin) attacked and was followed by Roman Kreuziger (Tinkoff), but Astana chased the move down. Meanwhile, Vicioso was dropped from the break; the rest of the breakaway had a one-minute lead going into the final climb. On the final climb, which had sections with a gradient of 28%, Verona attacked and escaped from the breakaway group, with Maté and Wellens chasing. Henao, Contador and Quintana attacked from the peloton, with Landa unable to follow. The riders were in several groups coming off the final climb, but Kreuziger's efforts brought the front groups back together with 2.3 kilometres (1.4 mi) remaining. On the final, uncategorised climb, Contador attacked, with Henao following, but Samuel Sánchez came past both of them and descended fast to the finish line, where he won the stage. Rui Costa (Movistar) finished second, on the same time as Sánchez, as part of a sixteen-rider chasing group that included all the main favourites except Landa, who lost eight seconds. Kelderman therefore moved into the race lead, four seconds ahead of Henao, with Landa now seven seconds behind in third place. Sánchez's victory was his first since he won a stage of the 2013 Critérium du Dauphiné and his first since signing for BMC.

Result of Stage 4
Rank	Rider	Team	Time
1	Samuel Sánchez (ESP)	BMC Racing Team	4h 13' 12"
2	Rui Costa (POR)	Lampre–Merida	+ 0"
3	Warren Barguil (FRA)	Team Giant–Alpecin	+ 0"
4	Alexis Vuillermoz (FRA)	AG2R La Mondiale	+ 0"
5	Sergio Henao (COL)	Team Sky	+ 0"
6	Nairo Quintana (COL)	Movistar Team	+ 0"
7	Alberto Contador (ESP)	Tinkoff	+ 0"
8	Wilco Kelderman (NED)	LottoNL–Jumbo	+ 0"
9	Lawson Craddock (USA)	Cannondale	+ 0"
10	Joaquim Rodríguez (ESP)	Team Katusha	+ 0"

General classification after Stage 4
Rank	Rider	Team	Time
1	Wilco Kelderman (NED)	LottoNL–Jumbo	17h 52' 48"
2	Sergio Henao (COL)	Team Sky	+ 4"
3	Mikel Landa (ESP)	Team Sky	+ 7"
4	Samuel Sánchez (ESP)	BMC Racing Team	+ 8"
5	Alberto Contador (ESP)	Tinkoff	+ 10"
6	Thibaut Pinot (FRA)	FDJ	+ 12"
7	Rui Costa (POR)	Lampre–Merida	+ 14"
8	Nairo Quintana (COL)	Movistar Team	+ 14"
9	Robert Gesink (NED)	LottoNL–Jumbo	+ 14"
10	Sébastien Reichenbach (SUI)	FDJ	+ 14"

=== Stage 5 ===
Profile of Stage 5

8 April 2016 – Orio to Arrate (Eibar), 159 km (99 mi)

The final road stage of the race included eight categorised climbs, the last of which came just 2 kilometres (1.2 mi) before the finish. It began where Stage 4 finished, in Orio, and covered a 159-kilometre (99 mi) course to Eibar, where it finished at the top of the Arrate climb. The first 60 kilometres (37 mi) took the riders along the coast, then inland to Eibar. On the way there were two climbs, one third-category and one second-category. The riders then left Eibar to the south for a 70-kilometre (43 mi) circuit that included three second-category climbs. There was then a 30-kilometre (19 mi) circuit to the north of Eibar with a further two second-category climbs. The riders then returned to the town for the final climb – the Arrate or Usartza – which was 5.4 kilometres (3.4 mi) long at an average gradient of 8.2%. Following the summit, there was a short descent to the finish line.

A large breakaway group formed at the beginning of the stage, consisting of at least eighteen riders. After 41 kilometres (25 mi), Diego Rosa attacked the breakaway. No one followed, and he set off on a solo breakaway. Rosa said after the stage that he had been intending to draw out a smaller breakaway group; as no one followed him, he decided to continue alone, even though he was more than 100 kilometres (62 mi) from the end of the stage. For a significant portion of the stage, Rosa was chased by Maxime Monfort and Sander Armée (both Lotto–Soudal), but they were not able to reduce his advantage. At the start of the final climb of the day, he had several minutes' lead.

In the peloton, Kelderman's LottoNL–Jumbo team was unable to stay with him to the end of the day and he was isolated for the final two climbs. Earlier in the day, he crashed on a corner during a wet descent and was left with rips in his clothing. On the final climb, Mikel Landa attacked from the group of overall favourites; he joined up with his teammate David López, who had been part of the early breakaway. López paced him for some time, with Simon Clarke (Cannondale) also joining the group. They were chased, however, by Tinkoff and brought back on the final climb. Contador then attacked, with only Henao able to follow. Ródriguez and Pinot chased; Kelderman attempted to stay with them but was dropped.

Rosa continued over the final climb and took a solo victory, several minutes ahead of the rest of the field. In the final metres, he stopped, dismounted and crossed the finish line on foot, holding his bike above his head. L'Équipe described his celebration as "unlikely but well deserved", after he had spent most of the stage riding alone. Henao and Contador finished together, two seconds ahead of Ródriguez and Pinot. Kelderman dropped to eighth place after finishing over a minute behind Henao and Contador. Henao took over both the overall lead and the points classification, while Rosa took over the lead of the mountains classification after winning six of the day's seven climbs.

More than thirty riders abandoned the race during the fifth stage. They included Fabio Aru, Dan Martin, Simon Gerrans, Ryder Hesjedal (Trek–Segafredo) and Simon Yates (Orica–GreenEDGE). Many of the retirements came after crashes on the wet roads.

Result of Stage 5
Rank	Rider	Team	Time
1	Diego Rosa (ITA)	Astana	4h 19' 19"
2	Sergio Henao (COL)	Team Sky	+ 3' 13"
3	Alberto Contador (ESP)	Tinkoff	+ 3' 13"
4	Joaquim Rodríguez (ESP)	Team Katusha	+ 3' 15"
5	Thibaut Pinot (FRA)	FDJ	+ 3' 15"
6	Samuel Sánchez (ESP)	BMC Racing Team	+ 3' 40"
7	Nairo Quintana (COL)	Movistar Team	+ 3' 41"
8	Lawson Craddock (USA)	Cannondale	+ 3' 56"
9	Rui Costa (POR)	Lampre–Merida	+ 4' 12"
10	Serge Pauwels (BEL)	Team Dimension Data	+ 4' 12"

General classification after Stage 5
Rank	Rider	Team	Time
1	Sergio Henao (COL)	Team Sky	22h 15' 24"
2	Alberto Contador (ESP)	Tinkoff	+ 6"
3	Thibaut Pinot (FRA)	FDJ	+ 10"
4	Joaquim Rodríguez (ESP)	Team Katusha	+ 12"
5	Samuel Sánchez (ESP)	BMC Racing Team	+ 31"
6	Nairo Quintana (COL)	Movistar Team	+ 38"
7	Lawson Craddock (USA)	Cannondale	+ 1' 00"
8	Wilco Kelderman (NED)	LottoNL–Jumbo	+ 1' 07"
9	Rui Costa (POR)	Lampre–Merida	+ 1' 09"
10	Sébastien Reichenbach (SUI)	FDJ	+ 1' 11"

=== Stage 6 ===
Profile of Stage 6

9 April 2016 – Eibar, 16.5 km (10.3 mi) (ITT)

The final stage of the race was a hilly, 16.5-kilometre (10.3 mi) individual time trial that started and ended in Eibar. The first 1.8 kilometres (1.1 mi) were fairly flat, but there was then a significant climb of 5 kilometres (3.1 mi) at 9.7%. There was then a 6.3-kilometre (3.9 mi) descent, followed by 4 kilometres (2.5 mi) of flat roads to the finish line.

Seventeen of the riders remaining in the race chose not to compete in the final stage. Caleb Fairly (Team Giant–Alpecin) was the first to start and completed the course in 34' 44". The first significant time was set by Adam Yates, who crossed the finish line with a time of 30' 06". This time remained the best time until the eighth-placed rider overnight – Nairo Quintana – set a time of 29' 18". Other well placed riders, including Pinot, Rodríguez and Landa, struggled on the steep climb. At the top of the climb, Quintana changed from a road bicycle to a time trial bicycle. The only rider able to beat Quintana's time was Alberto Contador. He was 23 seconds up at the top of the climb and finished five seconds ahead by the finish line. Cyclingnews.com suggested after the stage that Quintana's bike change may have cost him the stage victory. Henao, who had lost 46 seconds to Contador on the climb, finished 18 seconds behind and fell to second place overall.

Contador therefore won the race, twelve seconds ahead of Henao, with Quintana moving up to third place overall. It was the third time that he had won the Tour of the Basque Country in the final time trial.

Result of Stage 6 (ITT)
Rank	Rider	Team	Time
1	Alberto Contador (ESP)	Tinkoff	29' 13"
2	Nairo Quintana (COL)	Movistar Team	+ 5"
3	Sergio Henao (COL)	Team Sky	+ 18"
4	Adam Yates (GBR)	Orica–GreenEDGE	+ 53"
5	Samuel Sánchez (ESP)	BMC Racing Team	+ 1' 04"
6	Thibaut Pinot (FRA)	FDJ	+ 1' 09"
7	Rui Costa (POR)	Lampre–Merida	+ 1' 16"
8	Joaquim Rodríguez (ESP)	Team Katusha	+ 1' 16"
9	Miguel Ángel López (COL)	Astana	+ 1' 21"
10	Pello Bilbao (ESP)	Caja Rural–Seguros RGA	+ 1' 26"

General classification after Stage 6 (ITT)
Rank	Rider	Team	Time
1	Alberto Contador (ESP)	Tinkoff	22h 44' 43"
2	Sergio Henao (COL)	Team Sky	+ 12"
3	Nairo Quintana (COL)	Movistar Team	+ 37"
4	Thibaut Pinot (FRA)	FDJ	+ 1' 13"
5	Joaquim Rodríguez (ESP)	Team Katusha	+ 1' 22"
6	Samuel Sánchez (ESP)	BMC Racing Team	+ 1' 29"
7	Rui Costa (POR)	Lampre–Merida	+ 2' 19"
8	Simon Špilak (SLO)	Team Katusha	+ 2' 47"
9	Lawson Craddock (USA)	Cannondale	+ 2' 52"
10	Wilco Kelderman (NED)	LottoNL–Jumbo	+ 3' 14"

== Post-race analysis ==
=== Rider reactions ===
Alberto Contador had on various previous occasions announced that the 2016 would be his last as a professional racer. After his victory in the Tour of the Basque Country, however, he said "I'm sure this isn't the last time I come here" and said that he would probably continue beyond the 2016 season. It was his first general classification victory since the 2015 Route du Sud; he dedicated the victory to his fans and to Oleg Tinkov, the owner of the Tinkoff team. Sergio Henao said that he had tried a different tactic in the time trial – holding back early on in order to give more effort later in the stage – and said that he was pleased both with his own performance and with how his team had ridden. He said that he was feeling strong ahead of his main objectives for the season, the Ardennes classics. Quintana said that his bike change in the time trial had helped, but that it was not quite enough to win the stage. He said that he was pleased with how he had ridden the race and in particular with how he had recovered from illness earlier in the week.

=== UCI World Tour standings ===
In the 2016 UCI World Tour season-long competition, Contador's victory moved him from third place to second, 59 points behind his teammate Peter Sagan. Sergio Henao moved from eighth to fourth and Quintana from twelfth to fifth. Spain moved into the lead of the nations' ranking, having previously been fifth. Tinkoff retained their overall lead in the teams' ranking, ahead of Team Sky.

UCI World Tour standings on 9 April 2016
Rank	Rider	Team	Points
1	Peter Sagan (SVK)	Tinkoff	329
2	Alberto Contador (ESP)	Tinkoff	280
3	Richie Porte (AUS)	BMC Racing Team	222
4	Sergio Henao (COL)	Team Sky	204
5	Nairo Quintana (COL)	Movistar Team	178
6	Fabian Cancellara (SUI)	Trek–Segafredo	166
7	Greg Van Avermaet (BEL)	BMC Racing Team	162
8	Sep Vanmarcke (BEL)	LottoNL–Jumbo	141
9	Arnaud Démare (FRA)	FDJ	137
10	Simon Gerrans (AUS)	Orica–GreenEDGE	119

== Classifications ==
In the Tour of the Basque Country, four different jerseys were awarded. The general classification was calculated by adding each cyclist's finishing times on each stage; the leader received a yellow jersey. No bonus seconds were awarded.

The points classification – the leader of which wore a white jersey – was awarded on the basis of positions at stage finishes. The top 15 riders on each stage were awarded points (25 points for first, 20 points for second, 16 for third, 14 for fourth, 12 for fifth, 10 for sixth and one point fewer per place down to a single point for 15th). The rider with the highest number of points overall was the leader of the classification.

There were also two classifications awarded for positions at points in the middle of stages. Each stage (except the individual time trial) included individual sprint points (3, 2 and 1 points respectively for the top three riders); the rider with the highest total led the classification and wore a blue jersey. Each stage also included several categorised climbs, with more points awarded for the most difficult ("first-category") climbs. The rider with the most accumulated points led the classification and wore a red and white jersey.

There was also a classification for teams, in which the times of the best three cyclists from each team on each stage were added together; the team with the lowest total time led the classification.

=== Classification leadership table ===
Classification leadership
Stage	Winner	General classification	Points classification	Mountains classification	Sprints classification	Teams classification
1	Luis León Sánchez	Luis León Sánchez	Luis León Sánchez	Jonathan Lastra	Nicolas Edet	AG2R La Mondiale
2	Mikel Landa	Mikel Landa	Mikel Landa	Nicolas Edet	Nicolas Edet	Team Sky
3	Steve Cummings	Mikel Landa	Simon Gerrans	Stefan Denifl	Stefan Denifl	Team Sky
4	Samuel Sánchez	Wilco Kelderman	Samuel Sánchez	Stefan Denifl	Stefan Denifl	Team Katusha
5	Diego Rosa	Sergio Henao	Sergio Henao	Diego Rosa	Nicolas Edet	Team Sky
6	Alberto Contador	Alberto Contador	Sergio Henao	Diego Rosa	Nicolas Edet	Team Sky
Final		Alberto Contador	Sergio Henao	Diego Rosa	Nicolas Edet	Team Sky

=== Final classifications ===
Final general classification (top 10)
Rank	Rider	Team	Time
1	Alberto Contador (ESP)	Tinkoff	22h 44' 43"
2	Sergio Henao (COL)	Team Sky	+ 12"
3	Nairo Quintana (COL)	Movistar Team	+ 37"
4	Thibaut Pinot (FRA)	FDJ	+ 1' 13"
5	Joaquim Rodríguez (ESP)	Team Katusha	+ 1' 22"
6	Samuel Sánchez (ESP)	BMC Racing Team	+ 1' 29"
7	Rui Costa (POR)	Lampre–Merida	+ 2' 19"
8	Simon Špilak (SLO)	Team Katusha	+ 2' 47"
9	Lawson Craddock (USA)	Cannondale	+ 2' 52"
10	Wilco Kelderman (NED)	LottoNL–Jumbo	+ 3' 14"

Final mountains classification (top 10)
Rank	Rider	Team	Points
1	Diego Rosa (ITA)	Astana	55
2	Stefan Denifl (AUT)	IAM Cycling	53
3	Nicolas Edet (FRA)	Cofidis	28
4	Carlos Verona (ESP)	Etixx–Quick-Step	27
5	Luis Ángel Maté (ESP)	Cofidis	22
6	Jonathan Lastra (ESP)	Caja Rural–Seguros RGA	21
7	Alberto Contador (ESP)	Tinkoff	15
8	Sander Armée (BEL)	Lotto–Soudal	15
9	Dario Cataldo (ITA)	Astana	14
10	Sergio Henao (COL)	Team Sky	13

Final points classification (top 10)
Rank	Rider	Team	Points
1	Sergio Henao (COL)	Team Sky	70
2	Alberto Contador (ESP)	Tinkoff	62
3	Samuel Sánchez (ESP)	BMC Racing Team	61
4	Rui Costa (POR)	Lampre–Merida	51
5	Nairo Quintana (COL)	Movistar Team	47
6	Thibaut Pinot (FRA)	FDJ	37
7	Joaquim Rodríguez (ESP)	Team Katusha	33
8	Wilco Kelderman (NED)	LottoNL–Jumbo	30
9	Fabio Felline (ITA)	Trek–Segafredo	30
10	Mikel Landa (ESP)	Team Sky	26

Result of sprints classification (top 10)
Rank	Rider	Team	Points
1	Nicolas Edet (FRA)	Cofidis	11
2	Diego Rosa (ITA)	Astana	9
3	Stefan Denifl (AUT)	IAM Cycling	9
4	Luis Ángel Maté (ESP)	Cofidis	7
5	Dario Cataldo (ITA)	Astana	6
6	Carlos Verona (ESP)	Etixx–Quick-Step	5
7	Domingos Gonçalves (POR)	Caja Rural–Seguros RGA	4
8	Maxime Monfort (BEL)	Lotto–Soudal	4
9	Daniel Teklehaimanot (ERI)	Team Dimension Data	3
10	Jonathan Lastra (ESP)	Caja Rural–Seguros RGA	3

Result of team classification (top 10)
Rank	Team	Time
1	Team Sky	68h 26' 46"
2	Astana	+ 6' 10"
3	Team Katusha	+ 6' 35"
4	AG2R La Mondiale	+ 12' 32"
5	Cofidis	+ 13' 09"
6	Cannondale	+ 13' 59"
7	Lotto–Soudal	+ 14' 55"
8	Lampre–Merida	+ 16' 59"
9	Movistar Team	+ 17' 04"
10	FDJ	+ 17' 59"
