= 2017 Giro dell'Emilia =

2017 UCI Europe Tour

Race details
- Dates: 30 September 2017
- Stages: 1
- Distance: 223.3 km (138.8 mi)
- Winning time: 5h 31' 50"

Results
	Winner	Giovanni Visconti (ITA)	(Bahrain–Merida)
	Second	Vincenzo Nibali (ITA)	(Bahrain–Merida)
	Third	Rigoberto Urán (COL)	(Cannondale–Drapac)

The 2017 Giro dell'Emilia was the 100th edition of the Giro dell'Emilia road cycling one day race. It was held on 30 September 2017 as part of the 2017 UCI Europe Tour in category 1.HC, over a distance of 223.3 km, starting in Bologna and ending in Madonna di San Luca, Bologna.

The race was won by Giovanni Visconti of Bahrain–Merida.

== Teams ==
Twenty-four teams were invited to take part in the race. These included eleven UCI WorldTeams, nine UCI Professional Continental teams and four UCI Continental teams.

UCI WorldTeams

- Astana
- AG2R La Mondiale
- Bahrain–Merida
- BMC Racing Team
- Cannondale–Drapac
- Team Dimension Data
- FDJ
- Orica–Scott
- Team Sky
- Trek–Segafredo
- UAE Team Emirates

UCI Professional Continental Teams

- Bardiani–CSF
- Caja Rural–Seguros RGA
- CCC–Sprandi–Polkowice
- Cofidis
- Gazprom–RusVelo
- Wilier Triestina–Selle Italia
- Nippo–Vini Fantini
- Wanty–Groupe Gobert
- Androni–Sidermec–Bottecchia

UCI Continental Teams

- Amore & Vita–Selle SMP
- Sangemini–MG.K Vis
- GM Europa Ovini
- Unieuro Trevigiani–Hemus 1896

== Results ==
Result
Rank	Rider	Team	Time
1	Giovanni Visconti (ITA)	Bahrain–Merida	5h 31' 50"
2	Vincenzo Nibali (ITA)	Bahrain–Merida	+ 12"
3	Rigoberto Urán (COL)	Cannondale–Drapac	+ 15"
4	Nicolas Roche (IRL)	BMC Racing Team	+ 19"
5	Gianni Moscon (ITA)	Team Sky	+ 23"
6	Alexis Vuillermoz (FRA)	AG2R La Mondiale	+ 26"
7	Diego Ulissi (ITA)	UAE Team Emirates	+ 26"
8	Thibaut Pinot (FRA)	FDJ	+ 26"
9	Jack Haig (AUS)	Orica–Scott	+ 33"
10	Ben Hermans (BEL)	BMC Racing Team	+ 33"
