= 2010 Tour of Turkey =

Race details
- Dates: 11–18 April 2010
- Stages: 8
- Distance: 1,256.8 km (780.9 mi)
- Winning time: 32h 42' 28"

Results
	Winner	Giovanni Visconti (ITA)	(ISD–NERI)
	Second	Tejay van Garderen (USA)	(Team HTC–Columbia)
	Third	David Moncoutié (FRA)	(Cofidis)
	Points	André Greipel (GER)	(Team HTC–Columbia)
	Mountains	Rémi Pauriol (FRA)	(Cofidis)
	Team	ISD–NERI	

The 2010 Tour of Turkey was the 46th edition of professional road bicycle racing Tour of Turkey.

== Stages ==

=== Stage 1 ===
11 April 2010: Istanbul (prologue), 5.8 km

Stage 1 results

	Cyclist	Team	Time
1	(Germany) André Greipel	Team HTC–Columbia	00:08:40,450
2	(United States) Tejay van Garderen	Team HTC–Columbia	00:08:46
3	(Poland) Maciej Bodnar	Liquigas	00:08:49

General Classification after Stage 1

	Cyclist	Team	Time
1	(Germany) André Greipel	Team HTC–Columbia	00:08:40,450
2	(United States) Tejay van Garderen	Team HTC–Columbia	00:08:46
3	(Poland) Maciej Bodnar	Liquigas	00:08:49

=== Stage 2 ===
12 April 2010: Kuşadası to Turgutreis, 181 km

Stage 2 results

	Cyclist	Team	Time
1	(Germany) André Greipel	Team HTC–Columbia	04:40:33
2	(Italy) Angelo Furlan	Lampre N.G.C	04:40:33
3	(Italy) Claudio Cucinotta	De Rosa – Stac Plastic	04:40:33

General Classification after Stage 2

	Cyclist	Team	Time
1	(Germany) André Greipel	Team HTC–Columbia	04:49:03
2	(United States) Tejay van Garderen	Team HTC–Columbia	04:49:19
3	(Poland) Maciej Bodnar	Liquigas	04:49:22

=== Stage 3 ===
13 April 2010: Bodrum to Marmaris, 166 km

Stage 3 results

	Cyclist	Team	Time
1	(Italy) Giovanni Visconti	Team ISD	04:22:28
2	(Slovakia) Simon Špilak	Lampre N.G.C	04:22:28
3	(Estonia) Rein Taaramäe	Cofidis	04:22:28

General Classification after Stage 3

	Cyclist	Team	Time
1	(Estonia) Rein Taaramäe	Cofidis	09:11:47
2	(Italy) Giovanni Visconti	Team ISD	09:11:48
3	(Germany) André Greipel	Team HTC–Columbia	09:11:53

=== Stage 4 ===
14 April 2010: Marmaris to Pamukkale, 209 km

Stage 4 results

	Cyclist	Team	Time
1	(Italy) Giovanni Visconti	Team ISD	05:46:10
2	(United States) Tejay van Garderen	Team HTC–Columbia	05:46:10
3	(France) David Moncoutié	Cofidis	05:46:10

General Classification after Stage 4

	Cyclist	Team	Time
1	(Italy) Giovanni Visconti	Team ISD	14:57:48
2	(United States) Tejay van Garderen	Team HTC–Columbia	14:58:04
3	(France) David Moncoutié	Cofidis	14:58:15

=== Stage 5 ===
15 April 2010: Denizli to Fethiye, 221 km

Stage 5 results

	Cyclist	Team	Time
1	(Germany) André Greipel	Team HTC–Columbia	06:09:17
2	(Italy) Mattia Gavazzi	Colnago – CSF Inox	06:09:17
3	(Netherlands) Kenny van Hummel	Skil–Shimano	06:09:17

General Classification after Stage 5

	Cyclist	Team	Time
1	(Italy) Giovanni Visconti	Team ISD	21:07:08
2	(United States) Tejay van Garderen	Team HTC–Columbia	21:07:24
3	(France) David Moncoutié	Cofidis	21:07:35

=== Stage 6 ===
16 April 2010: Fethiye to Finike, 194 km

Stage 6 results

	Cyclist	Team	Time
1	(Germany) André Greipel	Team HTC–Columbia	05:01:22
2	(Italy) Davide Cimolai	Liquigas	05:01:22
3	(Italy) Manuel Belletti	Colnago – CSF Inox	05:01:22

General Classification after Stage 6

	Cyclist	Team	Time
1	(Italy) Giovanni Visconti	Team ISD	26:08:30
2	(United States) Tejay van Garderen	Team HTC–Columbia	26:08:53
3	(France) David Moncoutié	Cofidis	26:08:57

=== Stage 7 ===
17 April 2010: Finike to Antalya, 114 km

Stage 7 results

	Cyclist	Team	Time
1	(Italy) Elia Viviani	Liquigas	02:52:24
2	(Italy) Giovanni Visconti	Team ISD	02:52:24
3	(Italy) Andrea Grendene	Lampre N.G.C	02:52:24

General Classification after Stage 7

	Cyclist	Team	Time
1	(Italy) Giovanni Visconti	Team ISD	29:00:48
2	(United States) Tejay van Garderen	Team HTC–Columbia	29:01:17
3	(France) David Moncoutié	Cofidis	29:01:21

=== Stage 8 ===
18 April 2010: Antalya to Alanya, 166 km

Stage 8 results

	Cyclist	Team	Time
1	(Germany) André Greipel	Team HTC–Columbia	03:41:40
2	(Italy) Angelo Furlan	Lampre N.G.C	03:41:40
3	(Netherlands) Kenny van Hummel	Skil–Shimano	03:41:40

General Classification after Stage 8

	Cyclist	Team	Time
1	(Italy) Giovanni Visconti	Team ISD	32:42:28
2	(United States) Tejay van Garderen	Team HTC–Columbia	32:42:57
3	(France) David Moncoutié	Cofidis	32:43:01

== General classification ==
	Cyclist	Team	Time
1	Giovanni Visconti (ITA)	ISD–NERI	32h 42' 28"
2	Tejay van Garderen (USA)	Team HTC–Columbia	+29"
3	David Moncoutié (FRA)	Cofidis	+33"
4	Giampaolo Cheula (ITA)	Footon–Servetto–Fuji	+54"
5	Cristiano Salerno (ITA)	De Rosa – Stac Plastic	+1' 48"
6	Yukihiro Doi (JPN)	Skil–Shimano	+2' 52"
7	Oscar Gatto (ITA)	ISD–NERI	+3' 48"
8	André Greipel (GER)	Team HTC–Columbia	+4' 16"
9	Rémi Pauriol (FRA)	Cofidis	+5' 05"
10	Christophe Kern (FRA)	Cofidis	+5' 13"
