= 2015 Milano–Torino =

96th edition of the Milano–Torino cycling classic

2015 UCI Europe Tour
- Profile of the 2015 Milano–Torino

Race details
- Dates: October 1
- Stages: 1
- Distance: 186 km (115.6 mi)
- Winning time: 4h 27' 51"

Results
	Winner	Diego Rosa (ITA)	(Astana)
	Second	Rafał Majka (POL)	(Tinkoff–Saxo)
	Third	Fabio Aru (ITA)	(Astana)

The 96th edition of the Milano–Torino cycling classic was held on 1 October 2015. It was run over a distance of 186 km, starting near Milan in San Giuliano Milanese and ending near Turin on the Colle di Superga ("Superga Hill"). The route will pass through the plains of Vigevano and Lomellina, then reaching the hills near Casale di Monferrato. The final climb to the Superga Hill will have a mean slope of 9%, with maximal slope of 14% and will likely be the decisive point. The race will be first of the three races of the Trittico d'Autunno, the others being the Gran Piemonte (held on 2 October) and the "monument classic" Giro di Lombardia (held on 4 October). The race was won by Diego Rosa (Astana) ahead of Rafał Majka (Tinkoff–Saxo) and Fabio Aru (Astana). After the early breakaway had been caught, Astana rode hard on the first ascent of the Superga to eliminate a large number of riders. Rosa then attacked with 3 kilometres (1.9 mi) remaining on the final ascent. Although various riders, including Majka, Wout Poels (Team Sky) and Thibaut Pinot (FDJ), attempted to chase him down, Rosa stayed away to take his first win of the season by sixteen seconds.

== Teams ==
A total of 20 teams will take part to the race, 12 World Tour teams and 8 Professional Continental teams.

== result ==
Result
Rank	Rider	Team	Time
1	Diego Rosa (ITA)	Astana	4h 27' 51"
2	Rafał Majka (POL)	Tinkoff–Saxo	+ 16"
3	Fabio Aru (ITA)	Astana	+ 18"
4	Thibaut Pinot (FRA)	FDJ	+ 23"
5	Wout Poels (NED)	Team Sky	+ 32"
6	Damiano Cunego (ITA)	Nippo–Vini Fantini	+ 32"
7	Domenico Pozzovivo (ITA)	AG2R La Mondiale	+ 32"
8	Giovanni Visconti (ITA)	Movistar Team	+ 32"
9	Daniel Moreno (ESP)	Team Katusha	+ 36"
10	Davide Villella (ITA)	Cannondale–Garmin	+ 39"
Source: ProCyclingStats
