= Yolanda Arrieta =

Basque writer (born 1963)

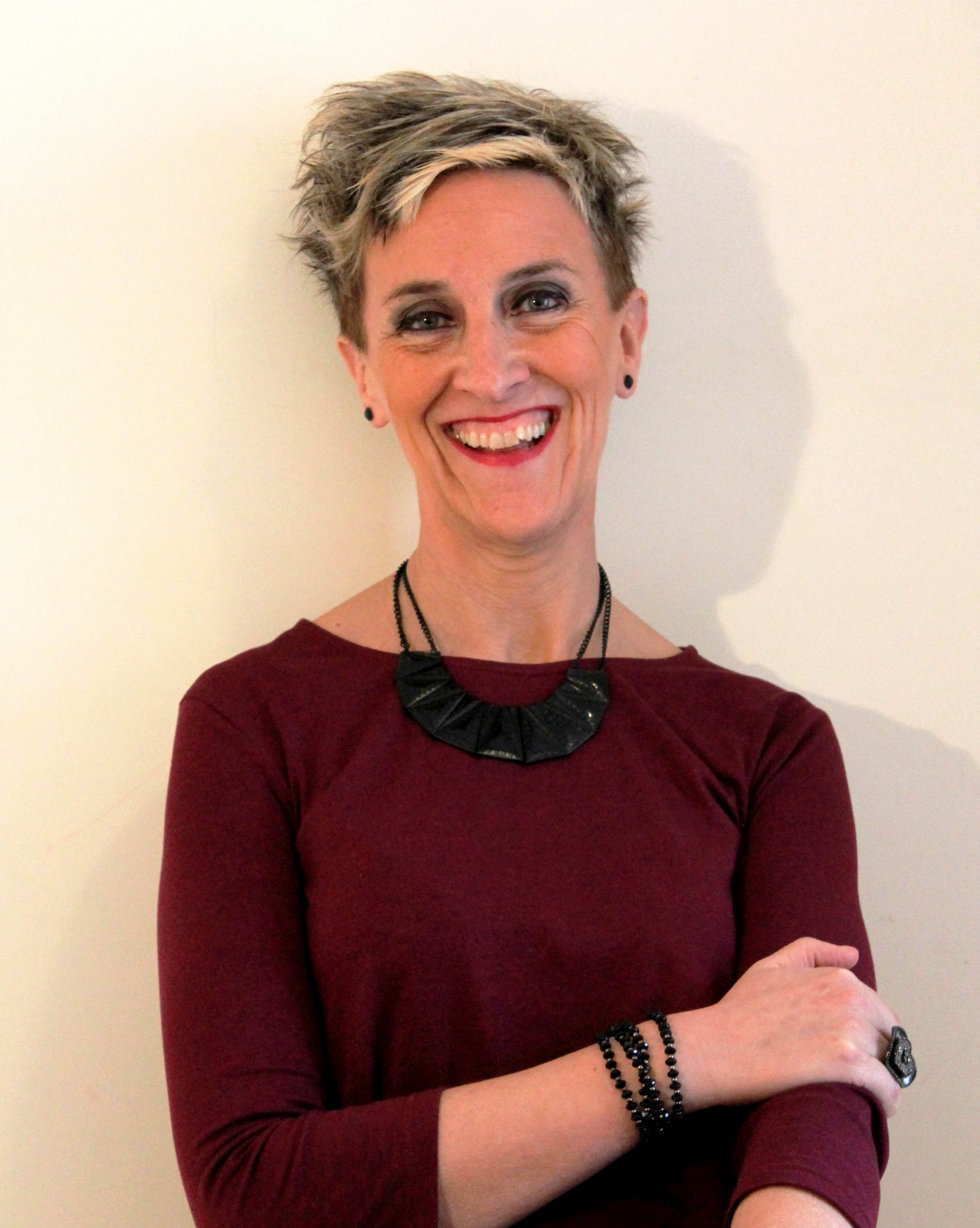
- Born: Yolanda Arrieta Malaxetxebarria; 1963-07-06; Etxebarria, Bizkaia, Spain
- Occupation: writer
- Writing career
- Language: Basque
- Genre: children literature
- Yolanda Arrieta's voice Recorded in June 2017

Yolanda Arrieta Malaxetxeberria (Etxebarria, Biscay, 6 July 1963) is a Basque writer. She completed her teaching studies in the school of teachers of Ezkoriatza, in the speciality of Basque Philosophy. After that, she studied theater at the Antzerti school and finally, she studied Cultural and Social Anthropology, at the Faculty of Philosophy and Educational Sciences of San Sebastián. Her greatest activity has always been literature, mainly as a creative writer and also conducting literary workshops and fostering a taste for Literature and Reading.

She has written books both for children and adults.

Besides her literature work, she has worked for EITB as a scriptwriter and lately she has worked as a guest signer in different basque newspapers (Berria and Deia) and magazines (Argia).

The main theme of her work is based on the fact that there are no small stories and also on the importance of women in the oral transmission of literature.

== Works ==
Her writing list is long. She has published more than fifiteen books. These are some of the last published ones:

=== Novels ===
- Agur, ama! (2009, Aizkorri)
- Ongi etorri! (2009, Galdakaoko Town Hall)
- Itzalpetik (2010, Erein)
- Nitaz ahaztu dira (2010, Erein)
- Amaren urteak (2011, Aizkorri)
- Iturretako ermita (2011, Markina-XemeinTown Hall)
- ABCD berri bat (2011, Mezulari)
- Ai, ai, ai! (2011, Mezulari)
- Basajaun eta Martin (2012, Erein)
- Maddalenen usaina (2014, Ibaizabal)
- Argiaren alaba (2015, Denonartean) Euskadi Saria Award Winner
- Kulun kuttunak (2016, Denonartean)
- Aho bete amets: ahozko haur poesiaren alde (2016, Denonartean)
- Luna-cuna (2017, Elkar)

=== Awards ===
- 1990: I Legazpi Award, Theater mode.
- 1991: Baporea Award
- 1991: Euskadi Theater Award
- 1991: Santurtziko Short Theater Award
- 1991: Pedro Barrutia Theater Award
- 1993: Donostia City Theater Award, Second Prize
- 1997: Irun City Award
- 2006: Max Award
- 2011: Peru Abarka Award
- 2015: Euskadi Literature Award
