= Tejay van Garderen =

American cyclist (born 1988)

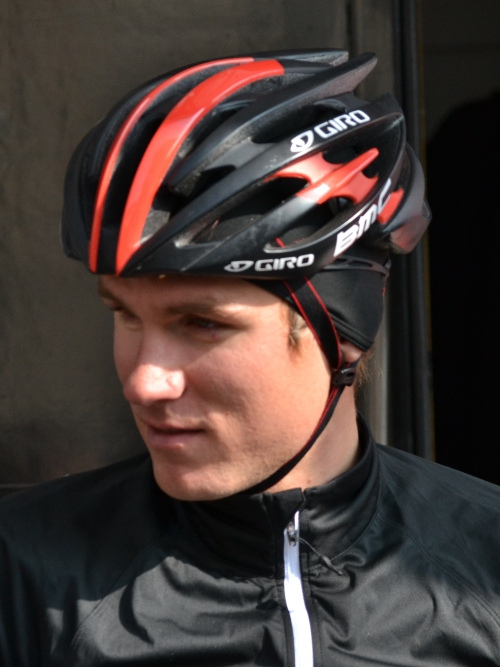
- Van Garderen at the 2013 Paris–Nice

Personal information
- Full name: Tejay van Garderen
- Born: August 12, 1988 (age 38) Tacoma, Washington, U.S.
- Height: 6 ft 1 in (1.86 m)
- Weight: 159 lb (72 kg)

Cycling career
- Sport: Cycling
- Current team: EF Education–EasyPost
- Discipline: Road
- Role: Rider (retired); Directeur sportif
- Rider type: Climber; Time trialist

Amateur teams
- 2004–2005: Rio Grande (Fort Collins, CO)
- 2005–2006: Team 5280 (Boulder, CO)
- 2007: VMG Racing

Professional teams
- 2008–2009: Rabobank Continental Team
- 2010–2011: Team HTC–Columbia
- 2012–2018: BMC Racing Team
- 2019–2021: EF Education First

Managerial team
- 2022–: EF Education–EasyPost

Major wins
- Grand Tours Tour de France Young rider classification (2012) 2 TTT stages (2015, 2018) Giro d'Italia 1 individual stage (2017) Vuelta a España 3 TTT stages (2010, 2015, 2017) Stage races Tour of California (2013) USA Pro Cycling Challenge (2013, 2014)
Medal record
Men's road cycling
Representing BMC Racing Team
World Championships
Gold medal – first place	2014 Ponferranda	Team time trial
Silver medal – second place	2012 Valkenburg	Team time trial
Silver medal – second place	2017 Bergen	Team time trial
Bronze medal – third place	2018 Innsbruck	Team time trial

Tejay van Garderen (born August 12, 1988) is an American former professional road racing cyclist, who rode professionally between 2008 and 2021 for the Rabobank Continental Team, HTC–Highroad, BMC Racing Team and EF Education–Nippo. Following his retirement as a cyclist, van Garderen became a directeur sportif for UCI WorldTeam EF Education–EasyPost.

== Early life ==
Van Garderen was born in Tacoma, Washington, but spent most of his childhood in Bozeman, Montana. His father is Dutch, and he speaks the Dutch language quite well. He began riding at 10, and by 14, he nearly beat two hours at the Mount Evans Hill Climb, a 28-mile (45-kilometre) climb gaining nearly 7,000 feet (2,100 metres). He won 10 junior national titles on the roads and in cyclo-cross. Two of his early teams were the Team Rio Grande Racing developmental squad (2004–2005; Fort Collins, Colorado) and Team 5280 Magazine developmental squad (2005–2006, once part of Garmin–Cervélo; Boulder, Colorado).

== Career ==
=== Under-23 years (2007–2009) ===
Van Garderen's first big senior race was at age 18 in the 2007 Tour of California as a part of the national team. He pulled out on stage 4. He rode in the U.S. and in Europe in 2007, and finished 20th in the Tour de l'Avenir.

Van Garderen joined the Rabobank Continental Team in 2008. He lived in the Netherlands and finished second in the Flèche du Sud and Circuito Montañés. He won a stage of the Tour de l'Avenir and finished 24th in the under-23 race at the UCI Road World Championships in Varese, Italy.

Van Garderen joined Team HTC–Columbia the following year.

=== HTC–Columbia (2010–2011) ===
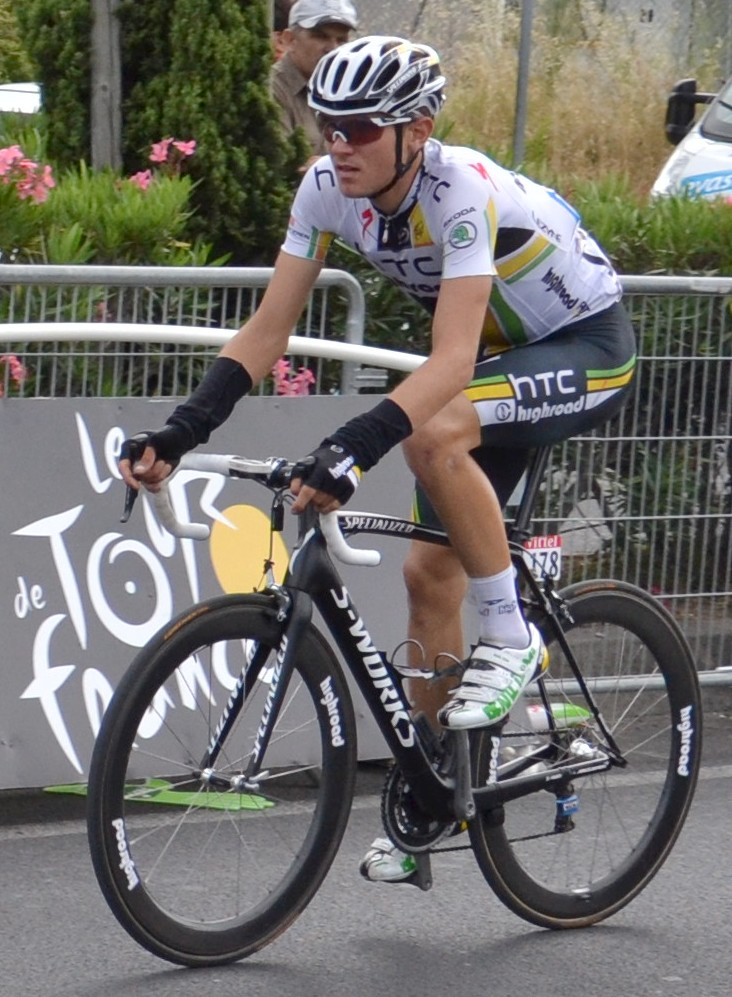
Van Garderen at the 2011 Tour de France

==== 2010 ====
Van Garderen came to a team with the most wins in 2009 thanks to prolific sprinters Mark Cavendish and André Greipel. He finished 9th in his first stage race, the Volta ao Algarve, climbing to 5th place on the third stage to the Alto do Malhão summit. In the Tour of Turkey, he came second on two stages and second overall, 29 seconds behind Giovanni Visconti. Van Garderen supported leader Michael Rogers over the 6th and 8th stages of the Tour of California; he finished 28th overall and Rogers won. Van Garderen started the Critérium du Dauphiné as joint leader of Team HTC–Columbia with Kanstantsin Sivtsov and Peter Velits. After nearly upsetting Alberto Contador in the prologue, he came 4th in the Stage 3 time trial to move to 2nd overall. He lost time on mountain stages and finished 3rd. Van Garderen rode a strong Vuelta a España with having a very strong first 2 weeks of the race. His level of performance dropped after that but was still a valuable domestique to Velits, who went on to third place overall in the race.

==== 2011 ====
In 2011, van Garderen got second place on stage 3 of the Volta ao Algarve and second place in the opening time trial in the Tour de Suisse, behind Fabian Cancellara of Leopard Trek. His strong showing in the Tour of California also earned him the best young rider jersey. He was chosen to be a part of the Tour de France squad. This was van Garderen's first Tour de France and he was riding in support of Tony Martin and Peter Velits. In stage 8, van Garderen won enough points on a Category 2 climb to earn a King of the Mountains jersey and Most Aggressive Rider honors. He was the first American to wear the King of the Mountains jersey in the history of the Tour de France – Greg LeMond briefly led the mountains classification during the 1986 Tour de France, but since he was also the overall leader at the time, he did not wear the mountains jersey. During his dramatic stage 8 ride, he was referred to as the "Bozeman Boss" by commentator Phil Liggett. He would finish in 82nd place. At the Tour of Utah, Van Garderen won the third stage time trial.

=== BMC Racing Team (2012–2018) ===
==== 2012 ====
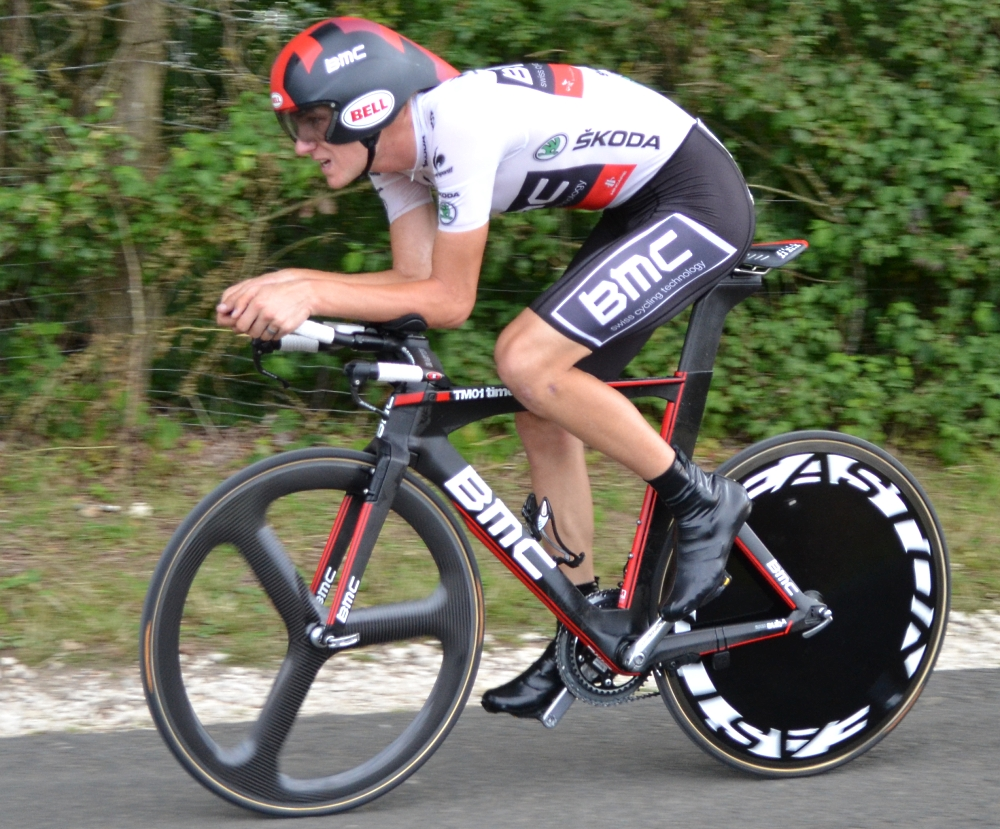
Van Garderen, wearing the white jersey as leader of the young rider classification, during the stage nineteen individual time trial of the 2012 Tour de France.

After HTC–Highroad was disbanded, Van Garderen joined BMC Racing Team along with his HTC–Highroad team-mate Marco Pinotti. Van Garderen won the young rider's jersey at Paris–Nice in early March, having held the jersey for the entire race.

Van Garderen was selected for the Tour de France as one of the main domestiques for defending champion Cadel Evans. He enjoyed a strong first week, coming fourth in the prologue and wearing the white jersey – for the best-placed rider aged 25 or under in the general classification – until stage 7, where he lost time on the first summit finish of the Tour. He regained the jersey with fourth place on Stage 9, an individual time trial. On Stage 11, Van Garderen attempted to help Evans in an unsuccessful long range attack by breaking away from the yellow jersey group minutes before his leader did, but the attempt orchestrated by BMC Racing Team was foiled. He proved stronger than Evans on that day, pacing his leader up the final climb. He would go on to finish in fifth place overall while becoming the third American to win the young rider classification, after Greg LeMond in 1984 and Andrew Hampsten in 1986.

In August, Van Garderen finished second in the USA Pro Cycling Challenge behind Christian Vande Velde (Garmin–Sharp). He had previously won the second stage of the race in a two-man sprint with Vande Velde, earning the yellow jersey in the process. He surrendered the jersey to his fellow countryman the next day, took it back on stage 4 and lost it on stage 6.

==== 2013 ====
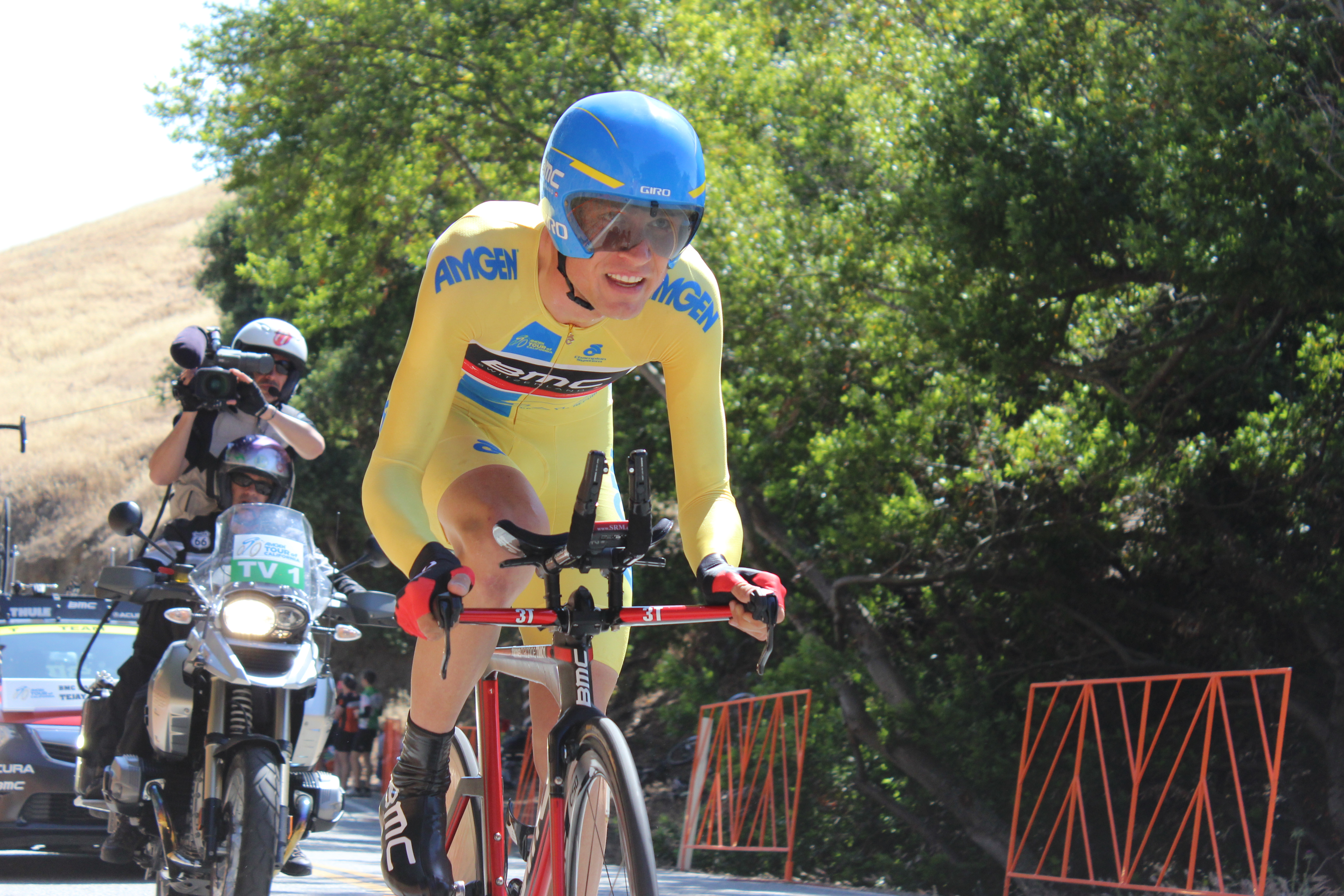
Van Garderen at the 2013 Tour of California

Van Garderen opened his 2013 campaign with the Tour de San Luis, where he finished second in the overall standings. He also showed strong appearances as the European cycling season opened in March, finishing Paris–Nice in fourth, and Critérium International in third place. In May, Van Garderen won the first major stage race of his career, the Tour of California. He performed well in all the key stages, coming in second at stage two's hilltop finish, then winning the individual time trial on stage 6. He topped it off by defending the lead on stage 7, a mountaintop finish to Mount Diablo. He somewhat lacked form at the Tour de France, finishing in 45th position. He was part of the breakaway on the eighteenth stage of the race, finishing at Alpe d'Huez, where he finished second behind Christophe Riblon. He then went on to win the USA Pro Cycling Challenge, which included a lot of high altitude racing across Colorado.

==== 2014 ====
Early in 2014 he won stage 4 of the Volta a Catalunya, a summit finish at the Vallter 2000 ski resort. He ultimately finished the race third overall, seven seconds behind race winner Joaquim Rodríguez. The Tour de France started out with hilly parcours in Yorkshire, with van Garderen finishing ninth on the second stage into Sheffield, won by Vincenzo Nibali. After losing two minutes to Nibali on the fifth stage, which included cobbles – to which he disapproved of – van Garderen lost a further minute two days later following a crash. His BMC Racing Team also lost domestique Darwin Atapuma, who suffered a broken leg in the same crash. Over the remainder of the race, van Garderen placed sixth or higher on five stages, and ultimately finished fifth overall, as the race reached its conclusion in Paris. He repeated his success of the previous year at the USA Pro Cycling Challenge, winning the general classification and two stages, and finished the season with a gold medal in the team time trial at the UCI Road World Championships.

==== 2015 ====
In 2015, van Garderen started his season at the Tour of Oman, where he took second place behind Rafael Valls. He earned his first victory of the year on the fourth stage of the Volta a Catalunya, which was the queen stage. However, he was too far down in the overall standings to affect the general classification. In June, he rode the Critérium du Dauphiné as a preparation for the Tour de France. He battled with Chris Froome who edged him in the overall classification by ten seconds and finished second. In spite of a strong first two weeks, he abandoned the Tour de France during Stage 17 due to illness a day after the second rest day. At the time of his abandon, he was in third place overall.

==== 2016–2018 ====
He chose to not attend the 2016 Summer Olympics over concerns of the zika virus.

He was named in the start list for the 2017 Giro d'Italia. He won stage 18, marking his first stage victory in a Grand Tour. His 2017 Vuelta a España got off to a good start with the BMC Racing Team winning the opening stage, a team time trial. Van Garderen ultimately recorded a 10th-place finish in the general classification, his third top-ten finish at a Grand Tour.

During the 2018 Tour de France he was involved in a rare tie for the Yellow Jersey following a team time trial, which Team BMC won. As there had not yet been an individual time trial to measure rider times to a 1,000th of a second his teammate Greg Van Avermaet was awarded the overall race lead due to his higher finishes within the peloton during the previous stages.

=== EF Education First (2019–2021) ===
Van Garderen moved to EF Education First for the 2019 season. At the Tour of California, he wore the leader's jersey for a few stages and finished 9th. He then performed well in the Critérium du Dauphiné finishing on the podium in 2nd place overall.

Prior to the COVID-19 pandemic, van Garderen intended to target the Giro d'Italia and the Tour de France in 2020.

He announced he would retire after the 2021 United States National Road Race Championships.

== Major results ==
2005
National Junior Road Championships

2nd Road race
3rd Time trial

2006
1st Time trial, National Junior Road Championships
2008
1st Stage 5 (TTT) Volta a Lleida
2nd Overall Flèche du Sud

1st Stage 2

2nd Overall Circuito Montañés
4th Overall Grand Prix Guillaume Tell

1st Stage 4

8th Overall Tour de l'Avenir

1st Stage 9

2009
1st Overall Tour du Haut-Anjou
1st Overall Circuito Montañés
2nd Overall Tour des Pays de Savoie
2nd Overall Tour de l'Avenir
3rd Time trial, National Under-23 Road Championships
3rd Overall Olympia's Tour

1st Prologue (TTT) & Stage 5

6th Overall Istrian Spring Trophy
7th De Vlaamse Pijl
2010
1st Stage 1 (TTT) Vuelta a España
2nd Overall Tour of Turkey
3rd Overall Critérium du Dauphiné
4th Overall Tour de l'Ain

1st Young rider classification

9th Overall Volta ao Algarve
2011
1st Stage 3 (ITT) Tour of Utah
2nd Overall Volta ao Algarve
3rd Overall USA Pro Cycling Challenge

1st Young rider classification

5th Overall Tour of California

1st Young rider classification

Tour de France

Combativity award Stage 8
Held after Stage 8

2012
UCI Road World Championships

2nd Team time trial
4th Time trial

2nd Time trial, National Road Championships
2nd Overall USA Pro Cycling Challenge

1st Stage 2

4th Overall Tour of California
5th Overall Tour de France

1st Young rider classification

5th Overall Paris–Nice

1st Young rider classification

7th Overall Volta ao Algarve
2013
1st Overall Tour of California

1st Stage 6 (ITT)

1st Overall USA Pro Cycling Challenge

1st Stage 5 (ITT)

2nd Overall Tour de San Luis
3rd Overall Critérium International

1st Young rider classification

4th Overall Paris–Nice
7th Overall Tour de Suisse
2014
1st Team time trial, UCI Road World Championships
1st Overall USA Pro Cycling Challenge

1st Stages 3 & 6 (ITT)

2nd Overall Tour of Oman
3rd Overall Volta a Catalunya

1st Stage 4

5th Overall Tour de France
6th Overall Tour of the Basque Country
2015
1st Stage 9 (TTT) Tour de France
1st Stage 1 (TTT) Vuelta a España
1st Stage 4 Volta a Catalunya
2nd Overall Tour of Oman
2nd Overall Critérium du Dauphiné

1st Stage 3 (TTT)

2016
1st Stage 1 (TTT) Tirreno–Adriatico
2nd Overall Vuelta a Andalucía

1st Stage 4 (ITT)

5th Overall Volta a Catalunya
6th Overall Tour de Suisse

1st Stage 7

7th Vuelta a Murcia
10th Overall Tour de Romandie
2017
1st Stage 18 Giro d'Italia
1st Stage 1 (TTT) Tirreno–Adriatico
2nd Team time trial, UCI Road World Championships
5th Overall Volta a Catalunya

1st Stage 2 (TTT)

6th Overall Tour de Romandie
10th Overall Vuelta a España

1st Stage 1 (TTT)

2018
1st Prologue Tour of Utah
1st Stage 3 (TTT) Tour de France
1st Stage 1 (TTT) Tour de Suisse
2nd Overall Tour of California

1st Stage 4 (ITT)

3rd Team time trial, UCI Road World Championships
3rd Overall Volta ao Algarve
8th Tour du Finistère
2019
2nd Overall Critérium du Dauphiné
9th Overall Tour of California
2020
1st Stage 1 (TTT) Tour Colombia
2021
3rd Time trial, National Road Championships

=== General classification results timeline ===
Grand Tour general classification results
Grand Tour	2010	2011	2012	2013	2014	2015	2016	2017	2018	2019	2020	2021
Giro d'Italia	—	—	—	—	—	—	—	20	—	—	—	84
Tour de France	—	82	5	45	5	DNF	29	—	32	DNF	91	—
Vuelta a España	35	—	—	—	—	DNF	DNF	10	—	DNF	113	—
Major stage race general classification results
Race	2010	2011	2012	2013	2014	2015	2016	2017	2018	2019	2020	2021
Paris–Nice	—	31	5	4	DNF	16	—	—	DNF	19	DNF	—
Tirreno–Adriatico	—	—	—	—	—	—	25	21	—	—	—	—
Volta a Catalunya	62	—	DNF	—	3	30	5	5	17	DNF	NH	70
Tour of the Basque Country	—	65	—	DNF	6	11	—	—	—	—	NH	—
Tour de Romandie	—	—	DNF	—	DNF	—	10	6	45	—	NH	57
Critérium du Dauphiné	3	—	14	—	13	2	—	—	—	2	82	—
Tour de Suisse	—	11	—	7	—	—	6	35	37	—	NH	—

Legend
—	Did not compete
DNF	Did not finish
NH	Not held
