= Diego Rosa (cyclist) =

Italian cyclist

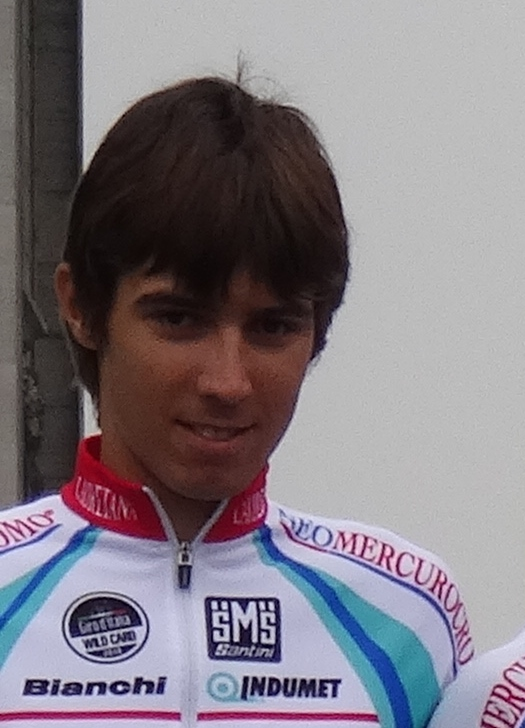
- Rosa in 2014

Personal information
- Full name: Diego Rosa
- Born: 27 March 1989 (age 37) Corneliano d'Alba, Italy
- Height: 1.78 m (5 ft 10 in)
- Weight: 65 kg (143 lb)

Cycling career
- Sport: Cycling
- Discipline: Road
- Role: Rider
- Rider type: Climber

Amateur teams
- 2011: Giant Italia Team
- 2012: Palazzago Elledent Rad

Professional teams
- 2013–2014: Androni Giocattoli–Venezuela
- 2015–2016: Astana
- 2017–2019: Team Sky
- 2020–2021: Arkéa–Samsic
- 2022: Eolo–Kometa

Major wins
- One-day Races and Classics Milano–Torino (2015)

Diego Rosa (born 27 March 1989) is an Italian former racing cyclist, who competed as a professional from 2013 to 2022. He rode in nine Grand Tours and was victorious in the 2015 Milano–Torino.

== Career ==
In August 2014, Astana announced that they had signed Rosa for the 2015 season, with general manager Alexander Vinokourov highlighting his role as a domestique for Fabio Aru. His first professional victory was the 2015 Milano–Torino. In 2016, he won a mountain stage of the Tour of the Basque Country. He celebrated his solo win by stepping off his bike and crossing the finish line by foot, holding his bicycle in the air.

Rosa has competed in eight Grand Tours. In his Grand Tour debut, the 2013 Giro d'Italia, he finished 22nd overall. After not finishing the 2014 Giro d'Italia, he finished in the top 25 in both the 2015 Giro d'Italia and the 2015 Vuelta a España.

He joined Team Sky for the 2017 season.

== Major results ==
=== Mountain bike ===
2011
3rd Nalles
2023
1st Marathon, National Championships
1st Primiero San Martino di Castrozza
UCI XCM World Cup

2nd Morzine-Avoriaz
5th Finale Ligure

2026
4th Marathon, UCI World Championships

=== Road ===
2012
1st Overall Giro del Friuli-Venezia Giulia

1st Stage 3

1st Mountains classification, Giro Ciclistico d'Italia
3rd Trofeo Franco Balestra
5th Trofeo Internazionale Bastianelli
6th Gran Premio San Giuseppe
2013
1st Young rider classification, Tour Méditerranéen
5th Overall Route du Sud
2014
8th Giro dell'Emilia
10th Overall Settimana Internazionale di Coppi e Bartali
2015 (1 pro win)
1st Milano–Torino
5th Giro di Lombardia
5th Strade Bianche
2016 (1)
Tour of the Basque Country

1st Mountains classification
1st Stage 5

2nd Giro di Lombardia
7th Overall Volta a la Comunitat Valenciana
8th Overall Critérium du Dauphiné
10th Liège–Bastogne–Liège
2017
1st Mountains classification, Tour de Pologne
5th Overall Vuelta a Andalucía
2018 (1)
1st Overall Settimana Internazionale Coppi e Bartali

1st Stage 1b (TTT)

2019
2nd Memorial Marco Pantani
3rd Overall Tour of Guangxi
2020
3rd Trofeo Laigueglia
4th Trofeo Serra de Tramuntana
5th Pollença–Andratx
10th Strade Bianche
2022
Giro d'Italia

Held after Stages 9–14
Combativity award Stage 6

==== Grand Tour general classification results timeline ====
Grand Tour	2013	2014	2015	2016	2017	2018	2019	2020	2021	2022
Giro d'Italia	23	DNF	23	—	55	—	—	—	—	77
Tour de France	—	—	—	37	—	—	—	DNF	—	—
Vuelta a España	—	—	20	—	53	—	—	—	—	—

==== Classics results timeline ====
Monument	2013	2014	2015	2016	2017	2018	2019	2020	2021	2022
Milan–San Remo	122	66	—	—	—	—	—	—	—	46
Tour of Flanders	Did not contest during his career									
Paris–Roubaix	Did not contest during his career									
Liège–Bastogne–Liège	—	—	—	10	79	—	—	—	52	—
Giro di Lombardia	29	38	5	2	17	86	DNF	—	—	—
Classic	2013	2014	2015	2016	2017	2018	2019	2020	2021	2022
Strade Bianche	—	66	5	—	83	—	24	10	57	—
Amstel Gold Race	—	—	57	22	—	—	67	NH	—	—
La Flèche Wallonne	—	—	—	20	30	—	DNF	—	106	—
Grand Prix Cycliste de Québec	—	—	—	37	—	—	—	Not held		—
Grand Prix Cycliste de Montréal	—	—	—	34	—	—	—	Not held		—
Milano–Torino	30	11	1	21	22	92	20	—	—	—

Legend
—	Did not compete
DNF	Did not finish
DNS	Did not start
NH	Not held
