= 2010 Critérium du Dauphiné =

2010 UCI World Ranking, race 15 of 26
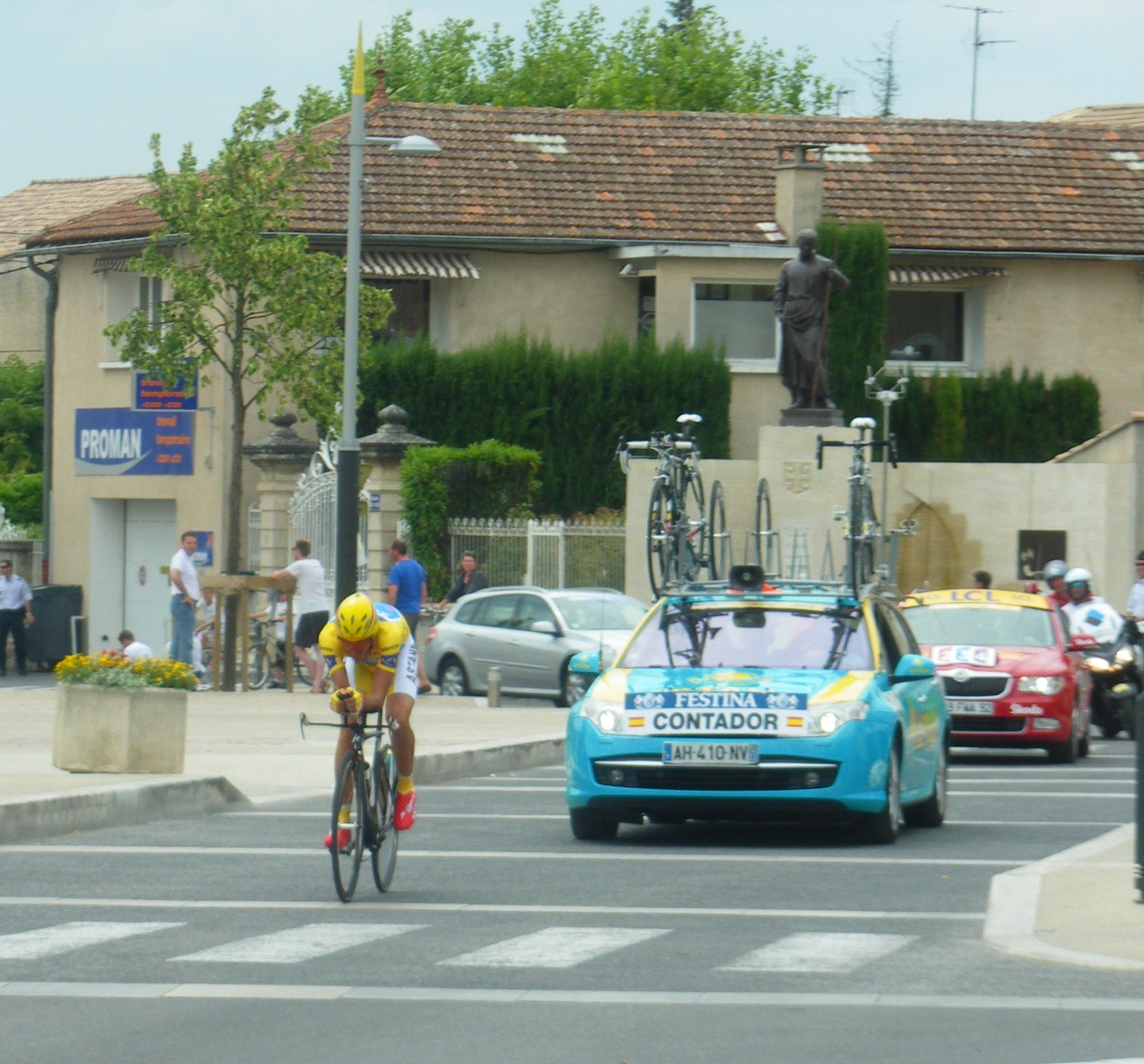
- Alberto Contador in the race leader's yellow jersey, during the Stage 3 individual time trial

Race details
- Dates: 6–13 June 2010
- Stages: 7+prologue
- Distance: 1,080 km (670 mi)
- Winning time: 28h 06' 28"

Results
Jersey awarded to the overall winner	Winner	Janez Brajkovič (SVN)	(Team RadioShack)
	Second	Alberto Contador (ESP)	(Astana)
	Third	Tejay van Garderen (USA)	(Team HTC–Columbia)
Jersey awarded to the points classification winner	Points	Alberto Contador (ESP)	(Astana)
Jersey awarded to the mountains classification winner	Mountains	Egoi Martínez (ESP)	(Euskaltel–Euskadi)
	Team	(Spain) Euskaltel–Euskadi	

The 2010 Critérium du Dauphiné was the 62nd edition of the Critérium du Dauphiné (formerly Critérium du Dauphiné Libéré) stage race, and the first since it was renamed. It took place from 6–13 June, and was part of both the 2010 UCI ProTour and World Calendar. It began in Evian-les-Bains with an individual time trial, and ended in Sallanches.

The race was won by Slovenia's Janez Brajkovič, riding for Team RadioShack. Second in the general classification was Alberto Contador of Astana, while Tejay van Garderen finished third for Team HTC–Columbia. Contador won the points classification on a tie-break with Brajkovič, Euskaltel–Euskadi's Egoi Martínez won the mountains classification and Euskaltel-Euskadi also won the teams classification.

== Teams ==
As the Dauphiné Libéré was a UCI ProTour event, the 18 ProTour teams are invited automatically, plus an additional 4 non pro tour teams. They were:

- Ag2r–La Mondiale
- Astana
- Bbox Bouygues Telecom
- Caisse d'Epargne
- Cervélo TestTeam
- Cofidis
- Euskaltel–Euskadi
- Footon–Servetto–Fuji
- Française des Jeux
- Garmin–Transitions
- Lampre–Farnese Vini
- Liquigas–Doimo
- Omega Pharma–Lotto
- Quick-Step
- Rabobank
- Saur–Sojasun
- Team HTC–Columbia
- Team Katusha
- Team Milram
- Team RadioShack
- Team Saxo Bank
- Team Sky

== Pre-race favourites ==
The winner of the event for the previous two years, Alejandro Valverde, had been widely tipped to do well in the event, but was banned from all of UCI registered races for 19 months from a few days prior to the event. Two time Tour de France winner Alberto Contador started the race as favourite, but emphasized that his priority was to use the race as preparation for the Tour de France, without particular concern to win it.

== Route ==
Stage characteristics and winners
Stage	Date	Course	Distance	Type	Winner
P	6 June	Évian-les-Bains	6.8 km (4.2 mi)	Individual time trial	Alberto Contador (ESP)
1	7 June	Évian-les-Bains to Saint-Laurent-du-Pont	191 km (119 mi)	Hilly stage	Grega Bole (SLO)
2	8 June	Annonay to Bourg-Saint-Andéol	177 km (110 mi)	Hilly stage	Juan José Haedo (ARG)
3	9 June	Monteux to Sorgues	49 km (30 mi)	Individual time trial	Janez Brajkovič (SLO)
4	10 June	Saint-Paul-Trois-Châteaux to Risoul	210 km (130 mi)	High mountain stage	Nicolas Vogondy (FRA)
5	11 June	Serre-Chevalier to Grenoble	143.5 km (89.2 mi)	High mountain stage	Daniel Navarro (ESP)
6	12 June	Crolles to Alpe d'Huez	151.5 km (94.1 mi)	High mountain stage	Alberto Contador (ESP)
7	13 June	Allevard to Sallanches	148 km (92 mi)	Hilly stage	Edvald Boasson Hagen (NOR)

== Stages ==
=== Prologue ===
6 June 2010 – Evian-les-Bains, 6.8 km (4.2 mi) (Individual time trial)

Stage and General Classification after Prologue

	Rider	Team	Time
1	Alberto Contador (ESP)	Astana	8' 34"
2	Tejay van Garderen (USA)	Team HTC–Columbia	+ 2"
3	Janez Brajkovič (SLO)	Team RadioShack	+ 5"
4	Geraint Thomas (GBR)	Team Sky	+ 10"
5	Dario Cataldo (ITA)	Quick-Step	+ 12"
6	Rémi Pauriol (FRA)	Cofidis	+ 12"
7	Adriano Malori (ITA)	Lampre–Farnese Vini	+ 12"
8	Patrick Gretsch (GER)	Team HTC–Columbia	+ 13"
9	Paul Martens (GER)	Rabobank	+ 13"
10	Jérôme Coppel (FRA)	Saur–Sojasun	+ 14"

=== Stage 1 ===
7 June 2010 – Evian-les-Bains to Saint-Laurent-du-Pont, 191 km (118.7 mi)

Stage 1 Result

	Rider	Team	Time
1	Grega Bole (SLO)	Lampre–Farnese Vini	4h 47' 24"
2	Peter Velits (SVK)	Team HTC–Columbia	+ 0"
3	Geraint Thomas (GBR)	Team Sky	+ 0"
4	Steve Chainel (FRA)	Bbox Bouygues Telecom	+ 0"
5	Christophe Riblon (FRA)	Ag2r–La Mondiale	+ 0"
6	Christian Knees (GER)	Team Milram	+ 0"
7	Stefan Denifl (AUT)	Cervélo TestTeam	+ 0"
8	Maxime Bouet (FRA)	Ag2r–La Mondiale	+ 0"
9	Arkaitz Durán (ESP)	Footon–Servetto–Fuji	+ 0"
10	Julien El Fares (FRA)	Cofidis	+ 0"

General Classification after Stage 1

	Rider	Team	Time
1	Alberto Contador (ESP)	Astana	4h 55' 58"
2	Tejay van Garderen (USA)	Team HTC–Columbia	+ 2"
3	Janez Brajkovič (SLO)	Team RadioShack	+ 5"
4	Geraint Thomas (GBR)	Team Sky	+ 10"
5	Dario Cataldo (ITA)	Quick-Step	+ 12"
6	Rémi Pauriol (FRA)	Cofidis	+ 12"
7	Paul Martens (GER)	Rabobank	+ 13"
8	Jérôme Coppel (FRA)	Saur–Sojasun	+ 14"
9	Christophe Riblon (FRA)	Ag2r–La Mondiale	+ 14"
10	Gorka Verdugo (ESP)	Euskaltel–Euskadi	+ 15"

=== Stage 2 ===
8 June 2010 – Annonay to Bourg-Saint-Andéol, 177 km (110.0 mi)

Stage 2 Result

	Rider	Team	Time
1	Juan José Haedo (ARG)	Team Saxo Bank	4h 24' 10"
2	Martin Reimer (GER)	Cervélo TestTeam	+ 0"
3	Grega Bole (SLO)	Lampre–Farnese Vini	+ 0"
4	Sébastien Chavanel (FRA)	Française des Jeux	+ 0"
5	Roger Kluge (GER)	Team Milram	+ 0"
6	Andreas Stauff (GER)	Quick-Step	+ 0"
7	Jérémie Galland (FRA)	Saur–Sojasun	+ 0"
8	Samuel Dumoulin (FRA)	Cofidis	+ 0"
9	Geraint Thomas (GBR)	Team Sky	+ 0"
10	Michel Kreder (NLD)	Garmin–Transitions	+ 0"

General Classification after Stage 2

	Rider	Team	Time
1	Alberto Contador (ESP)	Astana	9h 20' 08"
2	Tejay van Garderen (USA)	Team HTC–Columbia	+ 2"
3	Janez Brajkovič (SLO)	Team RadioShack	+ 5"
4	Geraint Thomas (GBR)	Team Sky	+ 10"
5	Dario Cataldo (ITA)	Quick-Step	+ 12"
6	Rémi Pauriol (FRA)	Cofidis	+ 12"
7	Jérôme Coppel (FRA)	Saur–Sojasun	+ 14"
8	Christophe Riblon (FRA)	Ag2r–La Mondiale	+ 14"
9	Gorka Verdugo (ESP)	Euskaltel–Euskadi	+ 15"
10	David Millar (GBR)	Garmin–Transitions	+ 15"

=== Stage 3 ===
9 June 2010 – Monteux to Sorgues, 49 km (30.4 mi) (individual time trial)

Stage 3 Result

	Rider	Team	Time
1	Janez Brajkovič (SLO)	Team RadioShack	1h 01' 51"
2	David Millar (GBR)	Garmin–Transitions	+ 26"
3	Edvald Boasson Hagen (NOR)	Team Sky	+ 43"
4	Tejay van Garderen (USA)	Team HTC–Columbia	+ 53"
5	Denis Menchov (RUS)	Rabobank	+ 55"
6	Alberto Contador (ESP)	Astana	+ 1' 46"
7	Geraint Thomas (GBR)	Team Sky	+ 1' 56"
8	Christian Knees (GER)	Team Milram	+ 2' 09"
9	László Bodrogi (FRA)	Team Katusha	+ 2' 14"
10	Patrick Gretsch (GER)	Team HTC–Columbia	+ 2' 15"

General Classification after Stage 3

	Rider	Team	Time
1	Janez Brajkovič (SLO)	Team RadioShack	10h 22' 04"
2	David Millar (GBR)	Garmin–Transitions	+ 36"
3	Tejay van Garderen (USA)	Team HTC–Columbia	+ 50"
4	Alberto Contador (ESP)	Astana	+ 1' 41"
5	Geraint Thomas (GBR)	Team Sky	+ 2' 01"
6	Christian Knees (GER)	Team Milram	+ 2' 20"
7	Vladimir Gusev (RUS)	Team Katusha	+ 2' 45"
8	Denis Menchov (RUS)	Rabobank	+ 2' 47"
9	Gorka Verdugo (ESP)	Euskaltel–Euskadi	+ 2' 49"
10	Christophe Riblon (FRA)	Ag2r–La Mondiale	+ 2' 53"

=== Stage 4 ===
10 June 2010 – Saint-Paul-Trois-Châteaux to Risoul, 210 km (130.5 mi)

Stage 4 Result

	Rider	Team	Time
1	Nicolas Vogondy (FRA)	Bbox Bouygues Telecom	6h 03' 25"
2	Romain Sicard (FRA)	Euskaltel–Euskadi	+ 12"
3	Janez Brajkovič (SLO)	Team RadioShack	+ 15"
4	Alberto Contador (ESP)	Astana	+ 15"
5	Rein Taaramäe (EST)	Cofidis	+ 18"
6	Pierre Rolland (FRA)	Bbox Bouygues Telecom	+ 18"
7	Jurgen Van den Broeck (BEL)	Omega Pharma–Lotto	+ 18"
8	Eros Capecchi (ITA)	Footon–Servetto–Fuji	+ 18"
9	Rémi Pauriol (FRA)	Cofidis	+ 23"
10	Denis Menchov (RUS)	Rabobank	+ 23"

General Classification after Stage 4

	Rider	Team	Time
1	Janez Brajkovič (SLO)	Team RadioShack	16h 25' 44"
2	Tejay van Garderen (USA)	Team HTC–Columbia	+ 1' 15"
3	Alberto Contador (ESP)	Astana	+ 1' 41"
4	David Millar (GBR)	Garmin–Transitions	+ 1' 56"
5	Nicolas Vogondy (FRA)	Bbox Bouygues Telecom	+ 2' 43"
6	Denis Menchov (RUS)	Rabobank	+ 2' 55"
7	Jurgen Van den Broeck (BEL)	Omega Pharma–Lotto	+ 3' 06"
8	Christian Knees (GER)	Team Milram	+ 3' 10"
9	Rein Taaramäe (EST)	Cofidis	+ 3' 28"
10	Gorka Verdugo (ESP)	Euskaltel–Euskadi	+ 3' 29"

=== Stage 5 ===
11 June 2010 – Serre-Chevalier to Grenoble, 143.5 km (89.2 mi)

Stage 5 Result

	Rider	Team	Time
1	Daniel Navarro (ESP)	Astana	3h 26' 16"
2	Eros Capecchi (ITA)	Footon–Servetto–Fuji	+ 34"
3	Thibaut Pinot (FRA)	Française des Jeux	+ 34"
4	Dimitri Champion (FRA)	Ag2r–La Mondiale	+ 1' 39"
5	Egoi Martínez (ESP)	Euskaltel–Euskadi	+ 1' 39"
6	Christophe Moreau (FRA)	Caisse d'Epargne	+ 1' 39"
7	Blel Kadri (FRA)	Ag2r–La Mondiale	+ 2' 40"
8	Pierre Rolland (FRA)	Bbox Bouygues Telecom	+ 2' 40"
9	Luis Pasamontes (ESP)	Caisse d'Epargne	+ 2' 40"
10	Christophe Riblon (FRA)	Ag2r–La Mondiale	+ 2' 40"

General Classification after Stage 5

	Rider	Team	Time
1	Janez Brajkovič (SLO)	Team RadioShack	19h 55' 04"
2	Tejay van Garderen (USA)	Team HTC–Columbia	+ 1' 15"
3	Alberto Contador (ESP)	Astana	+ 1' 41"
4	David Millar (GBR)	Garmin–Transitions	+ 1' 56"
5	Nicolas Vogondy (FRA)	Bbox Bouygues Telecom	+ 2' 43"
6	Denis Menchov (RUS)	Rabobank	+ 2' 55"
7	Christophe Riblon (FRA)	Ag2r–La Mondiale	+ 3' 05"
8	Jurgen Van den Broeck (BEL)	Omega Pharma–Lotto	+ 3' 06"
9	Christian Knees (GER)	Team Milram	+ 3' 10"
10	Rein Taaramäe (EST)	Cofidis	+ 3' 28"

=== Stage 6 ===
12 June 2010 – Crolles to Alpe d'Huez, 151.5 km (94.1 mi)

Stage 6 Result

	Rider	Team	Time
1	Alberto Contador (ESP)	Astana	4h 31' 01"
2	Janez Brajkovič (SLO)	Team RadioShack	+ 0"
3	Sylwester Szmyd (POL)	Liquigas–Doimo	+ 17"
4	Jérôme Coppel (FRA)	Saur–Sojasun	+ 24"
5	Jurgen Van den Broeck (BEL)	Omega Pharma–Lotto	+ 40"
6	Christophe Moreau (FRA)	Caisse d'Epargne	+ 1' 17"
7	Christophe Riblon (FRA)	Ag2r–La Mondiale	+ 1' 18"
8	Samuel Sánchez (ESP)	Euskaltel–Euskadi	+ 1' 18"
9	Nicolas Vogondy (FRA)	Bbox Bouygues Telecom	+ 1' 18"
10	Chris Horner (USA)	Team RadioShack	+ 1' 26"

General Classification after Stage 6

	Rider	Team	Time
1	Janez Brajkovič (SLO)	Team RadioShack	24h 26' 05"
2	Alberto Contador (ESP)	Astana	+ 1' 41"
3	Tejay van Garderen (USA)	Team HTC–Columbia	+ 2' 41"
4	Jurgen Van den Broeck (BEL)	Omega Pharma–Lotto	+ 3' 46"
5	Nicolas Vogondy (FRA)	Bbox Bouygues Telecom	+ 4' 01"
6	Jérôme Coppel (FRA)	Saur–Sojasun	+ 4' 17"
7	Christophe Riblon (FRA)	Ag2r–La Mondiale	+ 4' 23"
8	Pierre Rolland (FRA)	Bbox Bouygues Telecom	+ 5' 54"
9	Chris Horner (USA)	Team RadioShack	+ 6' 10"
10	Sylwester Szmyd (POL)	Liquigas–Doimo	+ 6' 33"

=== Stage 7 ===
13 June 2010 – Allevard to Sallanches, 148 km (92.0 mi)

Stage 7 Result

	Rider	Team	Time
1	Edvald Boasson Hagen (NOR)	Team Sky	3h 39' 43"
2	Arkaitz Durán (ESP)	Footon–Servetto–Fuji	+ 27"
3	Egor Silin (RUS)	Team Katusha	+ 32"
4	Christophe Le Mével (FRA)	Française des Jeux	+ 34"
5	Tejay van Garderen (USA)	Team HTC–Columbia	+ 40"
6	Alberto Contador (ESP)	Astana	+ 40"
7	Christophe Riblon (FRA)	Ag2r–La Mondiale	+ 40"
8	Jurgen Van den Broeck (BEL)	Omega Pharma–Lotto	+ 40"
9	Jérôme Coppel (FRA)	Saur–Sojasun	+ 40"
10	Janez Brajkovič (SLO)	Team RadioShack	+ 40"

Final General Classification

	Rider	Team	Time
1	Janez Brajkovič (SLO)	Team RadioShack	28h 06' 28"
2	Alberto Contador (ESP)	Astana	+ 1' 41"
3	Tejay van Garderen (USA)	Team HTC–Columbia	+ 2' 41"
4	Jurgen Van den Broeck (BEL)	Omega Pharma–Lotto	+ 3' 46"
5	Jérôme Coppel (FRA)	Saur–Sojasun	+ 4' 17"
6	Nicolas Vogondy (FRA)	Bbox Bouygues Telecom	+ 4' 23"
7	Christophe Riblon (FRA)	Ag2r–La Mondiale	+ 4' 23"
8	Pierre Rolland (FRA)	Bbox Bouygues Telecom	+ 6' 16"
9	Chris Horner (USA)	Team RadioShack	+ 6' 20"
10	Sylwester Szmyd (POL)	Liquigas–Doimo	+ 6' 57"

== Classification leadership ==
Stage	Winner	General classification	Mountains classification	Points classification	Team Classification
P	Alberto Contador	Alberto Contador	Alberto Contador	Alberto Contador	Team HTC–Columbia
1	Grega Bole	Alberto Contador	Mathieu Ladagnous	Geraint Thomas	Quick-Step
2	Juan José Haedo	Alberto Contador	Bram Tankink	Grega Bole	Quick-Step
3	Janez Brajkovič	Janez Brajkovič	Bram Tankink	Geraint Thomas	Team HTC–Columbia
4	Nicolas Vogondy	Janez Brajkovič	Bram Tankink	Janez Brajkovič	Team Katusha
5	Daniel Navarro	Janez Brajkovič	Eros Capecchi	Geraint Thomas	Astana
6	Alberto Contador	Janez Brajkovič	Egoi Martínez	Janez Brajkovič	Euskaltel–Euskadi
7	Edvald Boasson Hagen	Janez Brajkovič	Egoi Martínez	Alberto Contador	Euskaltel–Euskadi
Final		Janez Brajkovič	Egoi Martínez	Alberto Contador	Euskaltel–Euskadi

== Final standings ==
=== General Classification ===
#	Rider	Team	Time
1	Janez Brajkovič (SLO)	Team RadioShack	28h 06' 28"
2	Alberto Contador (ESP)	Astana	+ 1' 41"
3	Tejay van Garderen (USA)	Team HTC–Columbia	+ 2' 41"
4	Jurgen Van den Broeck (BEL)	Omega Pharma–Lotto	+ 3' 46"
5	Jérôme Coppel (FRA)	Saur–Sojasun	+ 4' 17"
6	Nicolas Vogondy (FRA)	Bbox Bouygues Telecom	+ 4' 23"
7	Christophe Riblon (FRA)	Ag2r–La Mondiale	+ 4' 23"
8	Pierre Rolland (FRA)	Bbox Bouygues Telecom	+ 6' 16"
9	Chris Horner (USA)	Team RadioShack	+ 6' 20"
10	Sylwester Szmyd (POL)	Liquigas–Doimo	+ 6' 57"

=== Teams Classification ===
#	Team	Time
1	Euskaltel–Euskadi	84h 39' 25"
2	Astana	+ 4' 03"
3	Ag2r–La Mondiale	+ 4' 45"
4	Française des Jeux	+ 6' 46"
5	Team Katusha	+ 13' 12"
6	Bbox Bouygues Telecom	+ 13' 38"
7	Team HTC–Columbia	+ 14' 04"
8	Caisse d'Epargne	+ 21' 24"
9	Team Sky	+ 25' 37"
10	Cofidis	+ 26' 08"

=== Mountains Classification ===
#	Rider	Team	Points
1	Egoi Martínez (ESP)	Euskaltel–Euskadi	55
2	Janez Brajkovič (SLO)	Team RadioShack	33
3	Alberto Contador (ESP)	Astana	32
4	Cyril Gautier (FRA)	Bbox Bouygues Telecom	29
5	Thibaut Pinot (FRA)	Française des Jeux	26
6	Stefan Denifl (AUT)	Cervélo TestTeam	24
7	Bram Tankink (NED)	Rabobank	23
8	Guillaume Bonnafond (FRA)	Ag2r–La Mondiale	22
9	Christophe Moreau (FRA)	Caisse d'Epargne	22
10	Nicolas Vogondy (FRA)	Bbox Bouygues Telecom	21

=== Points Classification ===
#	Rider	Team	Points
1	Alberto Contador (ESP)	Astana	98
2	Janez Brajkovič (SLO)	Team RadioShack	98
3	Tejay van Garderen (USA)	Team HTC–Columbia	72
4	Grega Bole (SLO)	Lampre–Farnese Vini	71
5	Geraint Thomas (GBR)	Team Sky	70
6	Christophe Riblon (FRA)	Ag2r–La Mondiale	69
7	Jurgen Van den Broeck (BEL)	Omega Pharma–Lotto	51
8	Nicolas Vogondy (FRA)	Bbox Bouygues Telecom	48
9	Christophe Moreau (FRA)	Caisse d'Epargne	48
10	Nicolas Vogondy (FRA)	Bbox Bouygues Telecom	47
