= Etxebarria =

- Municipality
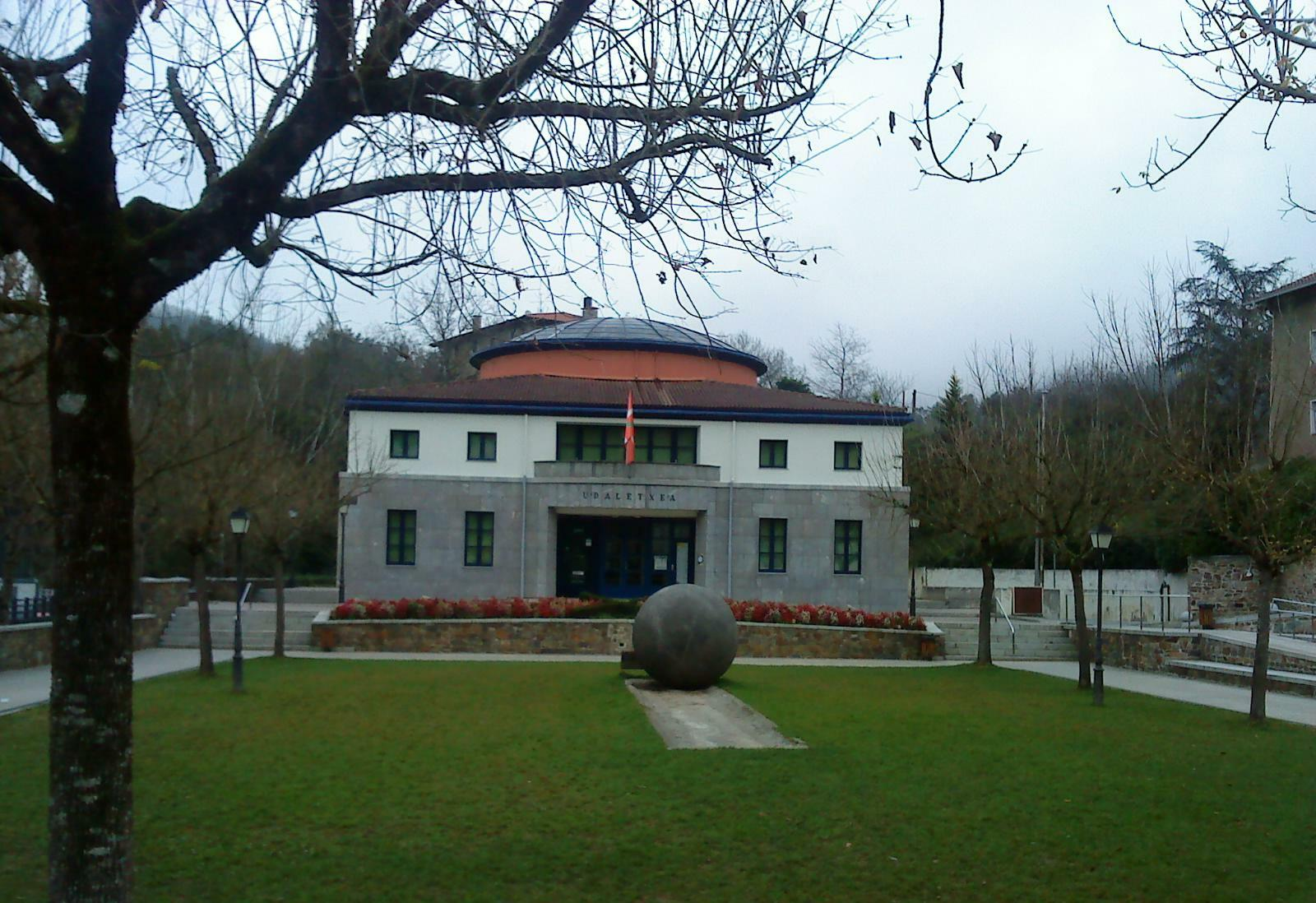
- Etxebarria town hall

- Flag Coat of arms

- Location of Etxebarria within the Basque Country Etxebarria (Spain)
- Coordinates: 43°15′15″N 2°28′38″W
- Country: Spain
- Autonomous community: Basque Country
- Province: Biscay
- Comarca: Lea-Artibai

Government
  - Mayor: Jesús Iriondo (EAJ-PNV)

Area
  - Total: 18.1 km^{2} (7.0 sq mi)
- Elevation: 105 m (344 ft)

Population (2025-01-01)
  - Total: 791
  - Density: 43.7/km^{2} (113/sq mi)
- Demonym: Basque: etxebarritarra
- Time zone: UTC+1 (CET)
  - Summer (DST): UTC+2 (CEST)
- Postal code: 48277
- Official language(s): Basque; Spanish
- Website: Official website

Etxebarria is a town and municipality located in the province of Biscay, in the autonomous community of Basque Country, northern Spain.

== See also ==
Javier, Etxebarri, Etxeberria, and Chávarri are names with the same Basque etymons.

== Notable people ==
- Yolanda Arrieta
