= Lesaka =

- Municipality
- Lesaka
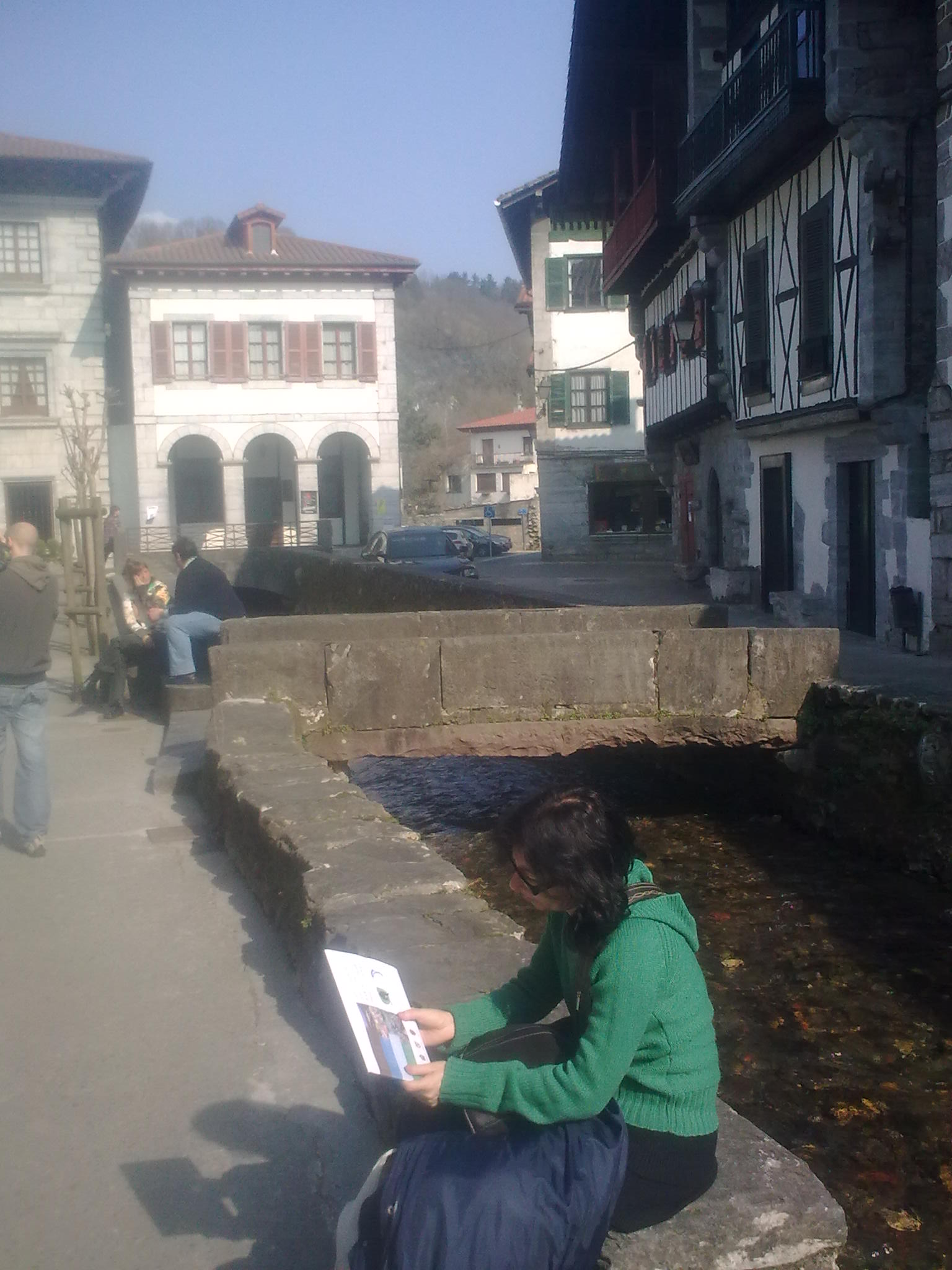
- Lesaka, the lower square where they dance in the festivities of July 7th

- Flag Coat of arms

- Location of Lesaka within Navarre Lesaka (Spain)
- Coordinates: 43°14′50″N 1°42′10″W
- Country: Spain
- Autonomous community: Navarre
- Province: Navarre
- Comarca / Eskualdea: Bortziriak
- Founded: 1402

Government
  - Mayor: José Luis Etxegarai (Geroa Bai)

Area
  - Total: 55.54 km^{2} (21.44 sq mi)
- Elevation: 77 m (253 ft)

Population (2025-01-01)
  - Total: 2,721
  - Density: 48.99/km^{2} (126.9/sq mi)
- Demonym: Lesakarra
- Time zone: UTC+1 (CET)
  - Summer (DST): UTC+2 (CEST)
- Postal code: 31770
- Official language(s): Basque, Spanish
- Website: Official website

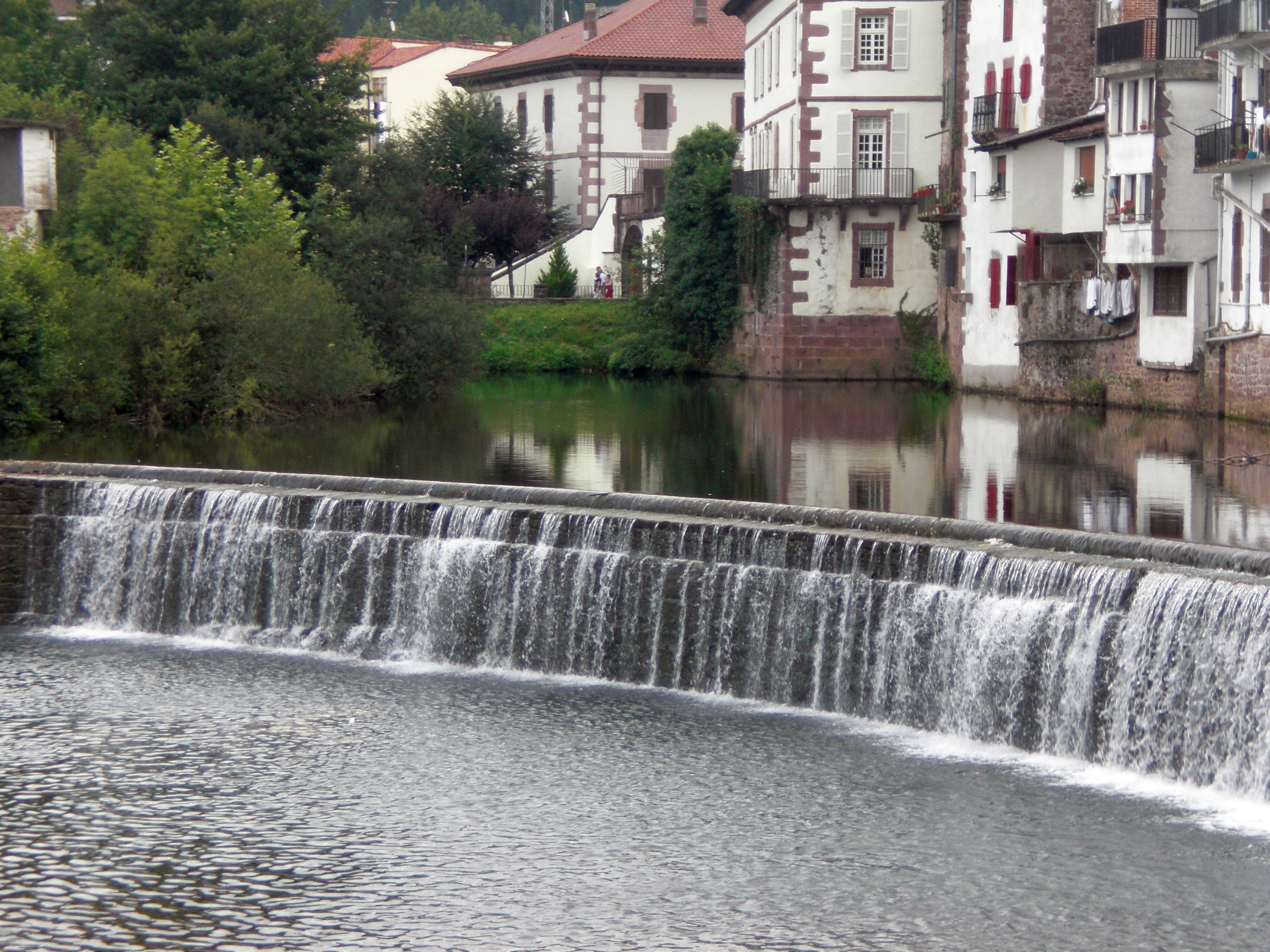
The river Onin and Lesaka.

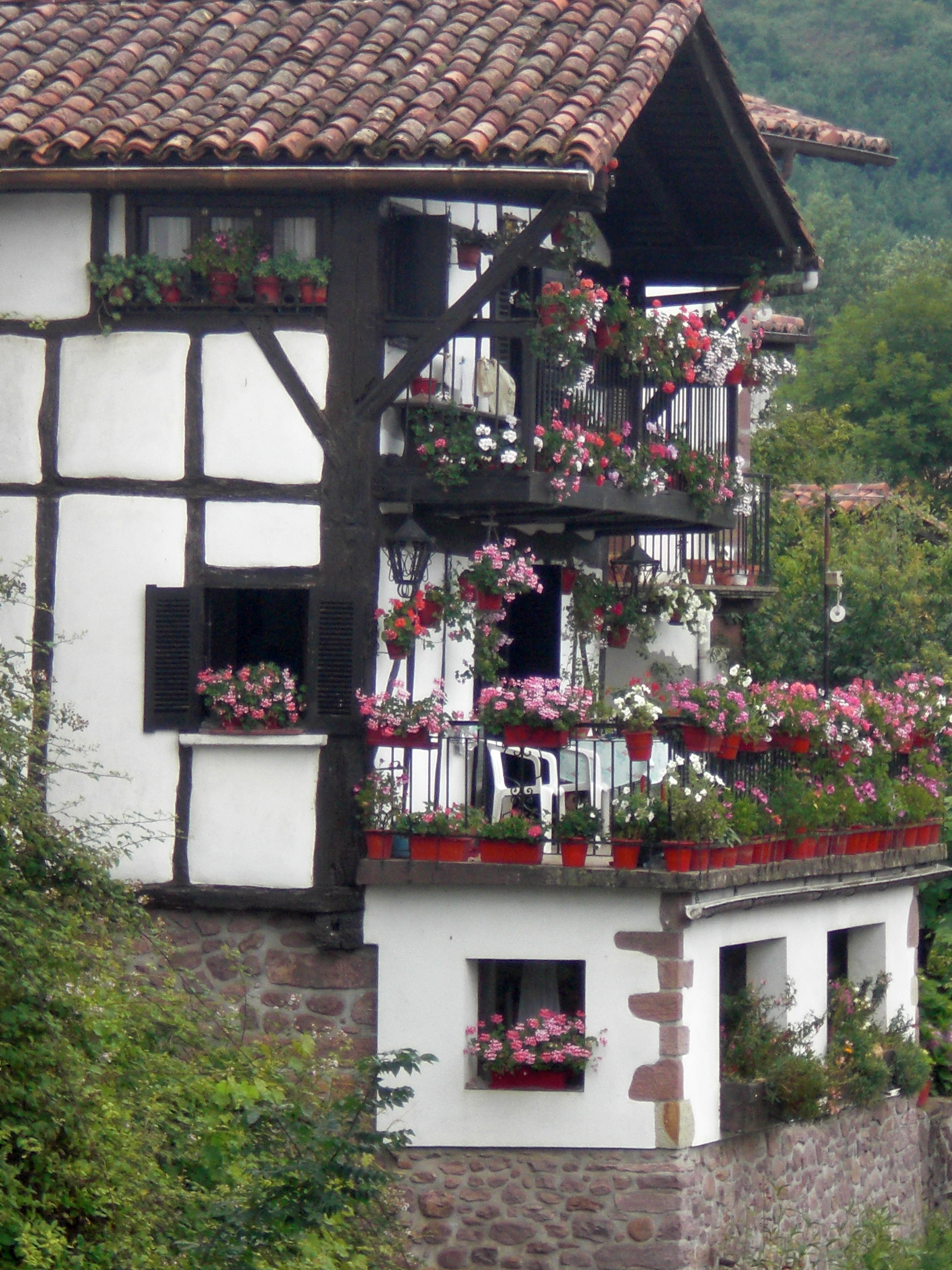
House in Lesaka

Lesaka is a town and municipality in the province and autonomous community of Navarre, in Spain. It is situated in the merindad of Iruña, in the region of Bortziriak (Five Villas) and to 75 km of the capital of the community, Iruña/Pamplona. The population in 2014 was of 2742 inhabitants.

The population centres in Lesaka are the following: Alkaiaga, Auzoberri, Biurrana, Kaztazpegi, Endara, Endarlaza, Frain, Izotzaldea, Lesaka centre, Navaz, Otsango Auzoa, Zala, and Zalain.
