= Giovanni Visconti (cyclist) =

Italian road bicycle racer

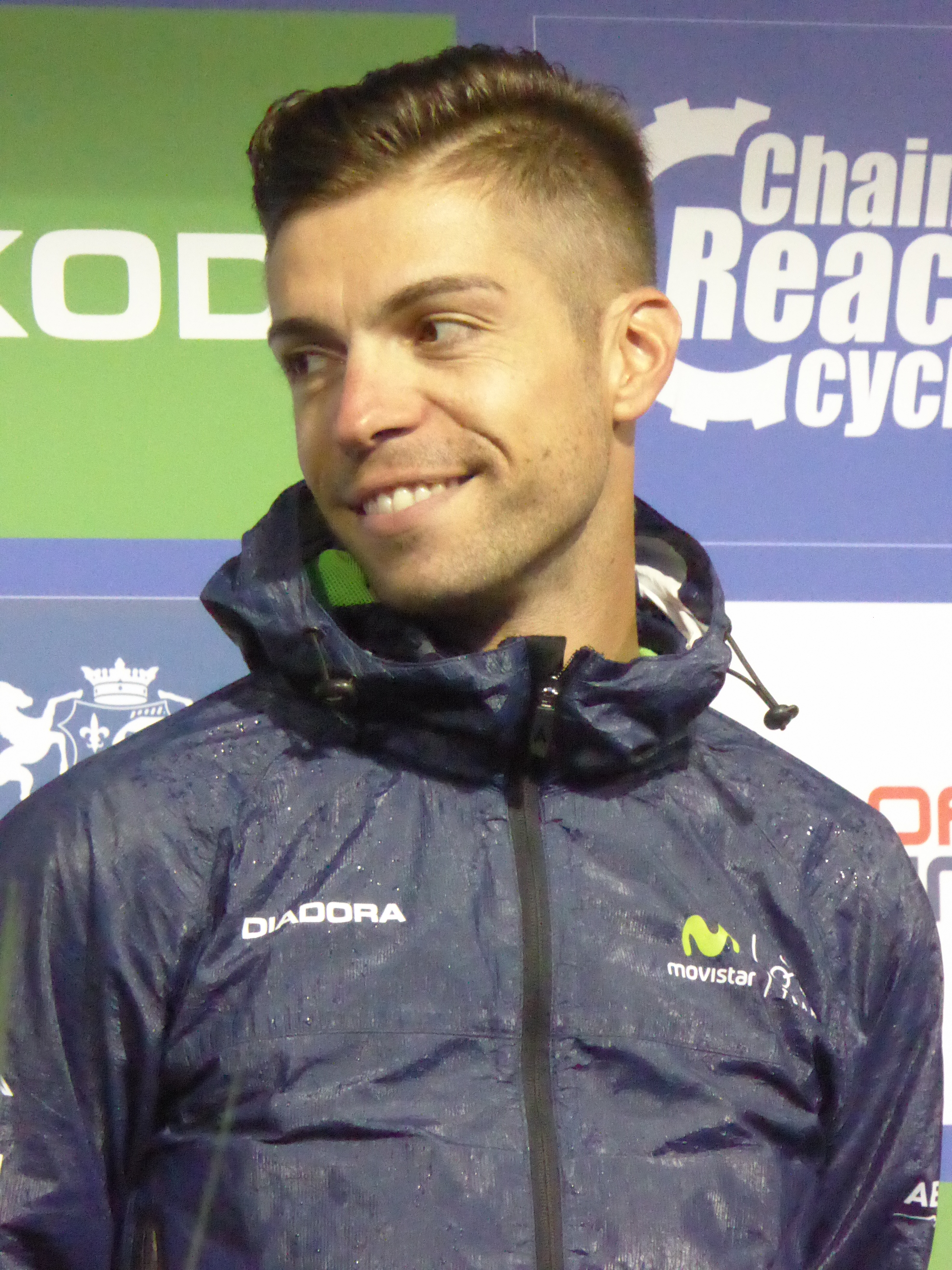
- Visconti at the 2016 Tour of Britain.

Personal information
- Full name: Giovanni Visconti
- Nickname: Visco
- Born: 13 January 1983 (age 43) Turin, Italy
- Height: 1.75 m (5 ft 9 in)
- Weight: 63 kg (139 lb)

Cycling career
- Sport: Cycling
- Current team: Retired
- Discipline: Road
- Role: Rider
- Rider type: Puncheur

Amateur teams
- 2002: Casprini
- 2003–2004: Finauto
- 2004: De Nardi–Piemme Telekom (stagiaire)

Professional teams
- 2005: Domina Vacanze
- 2006: Team Milram
- 2007–2008: Quick-Step–Innergetic
- 2009–2011: ISD
- 2012–2016: Movistar Team
- 2017–2018: Bahrain–Merida
- 2019–2020: Neri Sottoli–Selle Italia–KTM
- 2021–2022: Bardiani–CSF–Faizanè

Major wins
- Grand Tours Giro d'Italia Mountains classification (2015) 2 individual stages (2013) Stage races Tour of Turkey (2010) One-day races and Classics National Road Race Championships (2007, 2010, 2011) Giro dell'Emilia (2017) GP de Fourmies (2008) Other UCI Europe Tour (2008–09, 2009–10, 2010–11)

Giovanni Visconti (born 13 January 1983) is a former Italian professional road racing cyclist, who last rode for UCI ProTeam Bardiani–CSF 7 Saber.

== Professional career ==
=== Early career ===
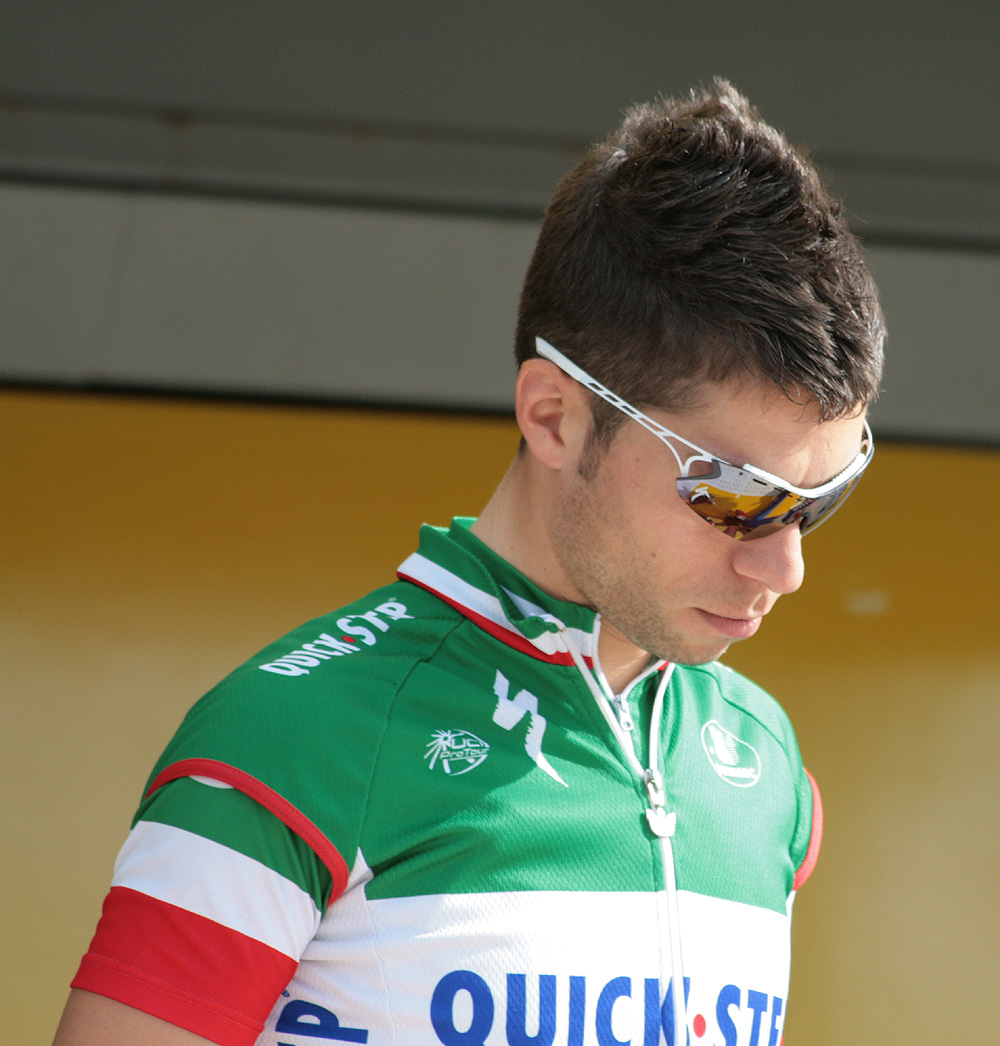
Visconti, wearing the Italian national champion's jersey, at the 2008 Liège–Bastogne–Liège

Born in Turin, Visconti won his first race in 2006 at the Coppa Sabatini. One year later, he won the Italian National Road Race Championships on 1 July 2007, beating Paolo Bossoni (Lampre–Fondital) and Davide Rebellin (Gerolsteiner) at the end in a sprint. At 12 kilometres (7.5 miles) to go Rebellin accelerated and left the main field, closely followed by Visconti, Bossoni, and Christian Murro (Tenax–Menikini). The four were able to keep the peloton away until the final meters.

In 2010, Visconti won the 2.HC Tour of Turkey overall classification after pocketing two stages along the way. He stood on the podium with Tejay van Garderen of Team HTC–Columbia and David Moncoutié of Cofidis. Racing himself for ISD–NERI at the time, he said after the win: "Look at the teams we've beaten: HTC-Columbia and Cofidis, not bad for a team like ours, isn't it?"

=== Movistar Team (2012–16) ===
In April 2012, now riding for Movistar Team, Visconti took his first victory of the season at the Klasika Primavera by outsprinting his own teammate Alejandro Valverde and Euskaltel–Euskadi's Igor Antón. Four Movistar Team riders finished in the first five positions. In May, Visconti had to withdraw from the Giro d'Italia during the fifteenth stage due to shortness of breath. He was told by his entourage that the event had all the symptoms of a panic attack. He came back to racing and signed a victory at the Circuito de Getxo, where his puncheur qualities served him well on the final climb, where he outsprinted Danilo Di Luca. He went to the Vuelta a Burgos and finished seventh overall thanks to consistent placings, especially in the queen stage to the Lagunas de Neila where he was eighth. In December, it has been announced by the Italian National Olympic Committee that Visconti was suspended for 3 months and would have to pay a 10,000 Euros fine since he worked with doctor Michele Ferrari, who had been banned for life for doping athletes. Visconti has denied Ferrari had ever supplied him with doping products. The suspension started retroactively on 10 October 2012.

In 2015, Visconti won the best climber's jersey of the Giro d'Italia, thanks to attacks in the final stages of the race. He qualified his conquest of the blue jersey as "a consolation" since he was going for stage wins that did not materialize during those attacks. He was named in the start list for the 2015 Vuelta a España.

== Major results ==
2003
1st Road race, UEC European Under-23 Road Championships
1st Road race, National Under-23 Road Championships
1st GP Inda-Trofeo Aras Frattini
1st Trofeo Gianfranco Bianchin
1st GP Kranj
5th Gran Premio Industrie del Marmo
2004
1st GP Kranj
1st Ronde van Vlaanderen Beloften
Giro delle Regioni

1st Stages 2 & 4b

2nd Menton–Savona
7th Road race, UCI Under-23 Road World Championships
8th Gran Premio Industrie del Marmo
2005
3rd Firenze–Pistoia
4th Overall Uniqa Classic
4th GP Industria & Artigianato di Larciano
4th Giro del Veneto
4th Coppa Placci
5th Coppa Ugo Agostoni
7th Trofeo Città di Castelfidardo
8th Trofeo Melinda
10th Gran Premio Nobili Rubinetterie
2006
1st Coppa Sabatini
2nd Trofeo Melinda
2nd Gran Premio Industria e Commercio di Prato
4th Trofeo Laigueglia
4th Coppa Placci
5th Overall Brixia Tour
8th Memorial Marco Pantani
2007
1st Road race, National Road Championships
1st Coppa Sabatini
1st Stage 2a Brixia Tour
3rd Firenze–Pistoia
4th Grand Prix de Wallonie
9th Clásica de San Sebastián
9th Giro di Lombardia
2008
1st Grand Prix de Fourmies
1st Stage 3 Vuelta a Andalucía
2nd Road race, National Road Championships
2nd Trofeo Pollença
2nd Grand Prix Pino Cerami
2nd Grand Prix de Wallonie
2nd Memorial Cimurri
2nd Japan Cup
4th Brabantse Pijl
4th Giro di Lombardia
5th Coppa Ugo Agostoni
9th Tre Valli Varesine
2009
1st UCI Europe Tour
1st Coppa Ugo Agostoni
1st Trofeo Melinda
1st Gran Premio Industria e Commercio di Prato
1st Stage 2 Tour of Slovenia
2nd Gran Premio Bruno Beghelli
2nd Coppa Sabatini
2nd Memorial Marco Pantani
3rd Gran Premio Industria e Commercio Artigianato Carnaghese
5th Overall Giro di Sardegna
5th Overall Settimana Internazionale di Coppi e Bartali

1st Stage 1b (TTT)

6th Giro del Friuli
6th Monte Paschi Strade Bianche
6th Giro della Romagna
6th Memorial Cimurri
8th Gran Premio Nobili Rubinetterie
8th Japan Cup
9th Coppa Bernocchi
9th Giro del Veneto
2010
1st UCI Europe Tour
1st Road race, National Road Championships
1st Overall Tour of Turkey

1st Stages 3 & 4

1st Classica Sarda
1st Stage 1 Tour de Luxembourg
1st Stage 1 (TTT) Brixia Tour
2nd Overall Tour of Slovenia
2nd Gran Premio Città di Camaiore
3rd Trofeo Melinda
3rd Giro della Romagna
3rd Coppa Sabatini
4th Giro dell'Appennino
4th Gran Premio Industria e Commercio di Prato
5th Grand Prix de Wallonie
7th Tre Valli Varesine
8th Trofeo Matteotti
10th Overall Giro di Sardegna
2011
1st UCI Europe Tour
1st Road race, National Road Championships
1st Gran Premio dell'Insubria-Lugano
1st Gran Premio Industria e Commercio Artigianato Carnaghese
1st Stage 4 Settimana Ciclistica Lombarda
2nd Overall Giro di Padania
2nd GP Industria & Artigianato di Larciano
2nd Grand Prix of Aargau Canton
3rd Overall Tour of Oman
3rd Gran Premio di Lugano
3rd Gran Premio Bruno Beghelli
3rd Coppa Bernocchi
4th Overall Settimana Internazionale di Coppi e Bartali

1st Points classification
1st Stage 5

4th Memorial Marco Pantani
4th Coppa Sabatini
6th Hel van het Mergelland
6th Grand Prix Pino Cerami
7th Giro di Lombardia
8th Montepaschi Strade Bianche
8th Giro dell'Appennino
2012
1st Klasika Primavera
1st Circuito de Getxo
3rd Memorial Marco Pantani
4th Coppa Sabatini
5th Gran Premio Industria e Commercio di Prato
7th Overall Vuelta a Burgos
7th Clásica de Almería
7th Coppa Ugo Agostoni
7th Giro dell'Emilia
8th Coppa Bernocchi
9th Gran Piemonte
10th Gent–Wevelgem
2013
Giro d'Italia

1st Stages 15 & 17
Held after Stages 1–2 & 4–8

7th Roma Maxima
9th Gran Premio Nobili Rubinetterie
2014
7th Circuito de Getxo
9th Clásica de San Sebastián
2015
1st Mountains classification, Giro d'Italia
2nd Memorial Marco Pantani
6th Trofeo Serra de Tramuntana
8th Trofeo Andratx-Mirador d'es Colomer
8th Klasika Primavera
8th Milano–Torino
2016
1st Klasika Primavera
3rd Overall Giro di Toscana

1st Stage 1

3rd GP Industria & Artigianato di Larciano
4th GP Miguel Induráin
4th Coppa Ugo Agostoni
5th Tre Valli Varesine
8th Overall Tour du Haut Var
8th Amstel Gold Race
10th Trofeo Pollenca-Port de Andratx
2017
1st Giro dell'Emilia
2nd Overall Tour of Slovenia
2nd Overall Giro della Toscana
9th Overall Tour of Oman
2018
Tour of Austria

1st Points classification
1st Stages 2, 4 & 8

2nd Road race, National Road Championships
2nd Trofeo Matteotti
4th Giro della Toscana
5th Strade Bianche
5th Gran Premio di Lugano
6th GP Industria & Artigianato di Larciano
9th Tre Valli Varesine
2019
1st Giro della Toscana
1st Stage 3 Tour of Austria
1st Mountains classification, Settimana Internazionale di Coppi e Bartali
2nd Overall Tour of Slovenia

1st Stage 4

2nd Tre Valli Varesine
5th Overall Giro di Sicilia
5th Overall Tour de Hongrie
5th Coppa Agostoni
5th La Drôme Classic
6th GP Industria & Artigianato di Larciano
6th Memorial Marco Pantani
8th Gran Piemonte
2020
9th Giro dell'Emilia
9th Giro dell'Appennino
Giro d'Italia

Held after Stages 15–16

=== Grand Tour general classification results timeline ===
Grand Tour	2007	2008	2009	2010	2011	2012	2013	2014	2015	2016	2017	2018	2019	2020	2021
Giro d'Italia	77	42	76	—	49	DNF	35	—	18	13	DNF	38	—	DNF	95
Tour de France	—	—	—	—	—	—	—	37	—	—	—	—	—	—	—
Vuelta a España	—	—	—	—	—	—	—	—	19	—	46	—	—	—	—

Legend
—	Did not compete
DNF	Did not finish
