= Adam Yates =

English racing cyclist

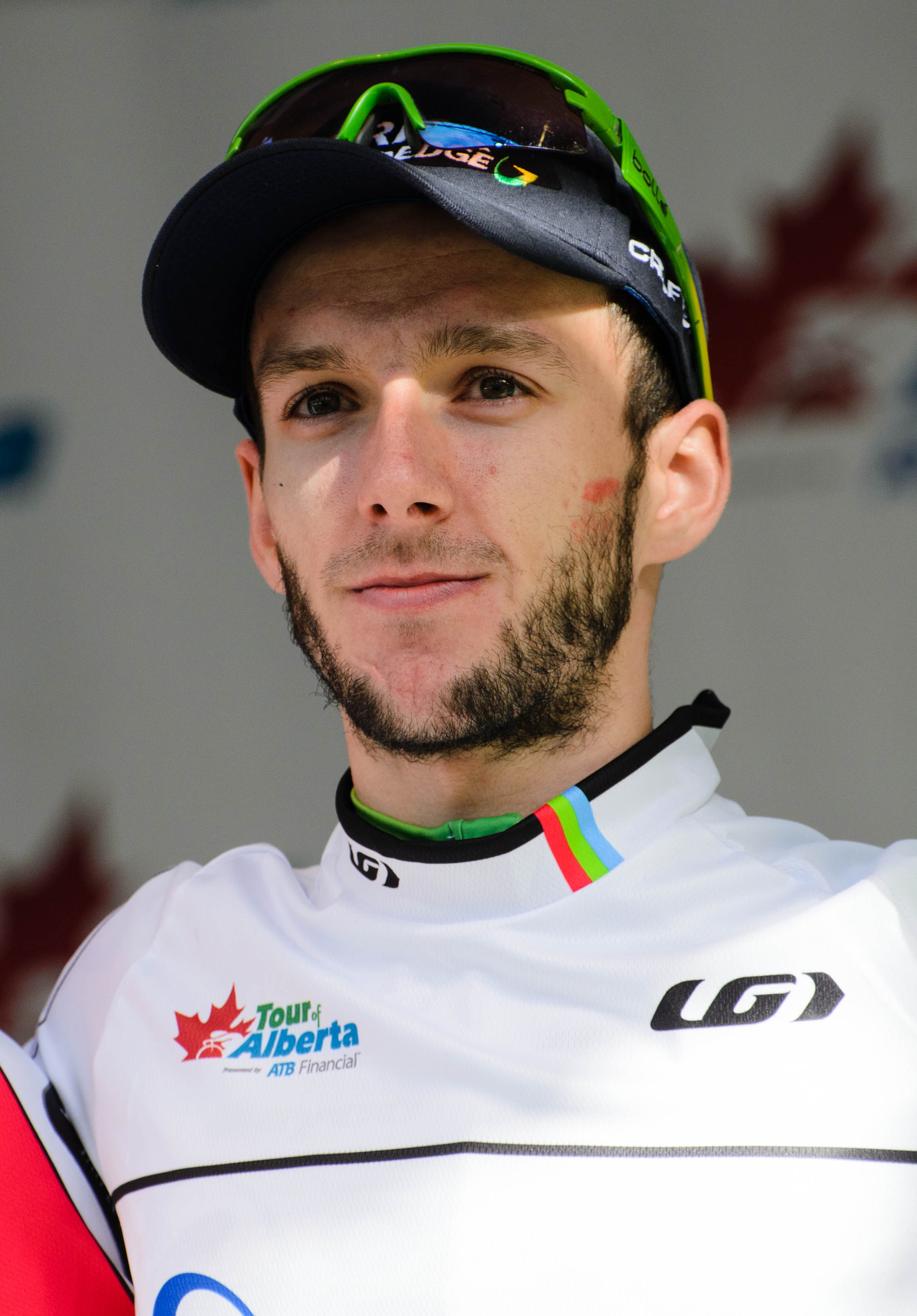
- Yates at the 2015 Tour of Alberta

Personal information
- Full name: Adam Richard Yates
- Nickname: The Shadow
- Born: 7 August 1992 (age 34) Bury, England
- Height: 1.73 m (5 ft 8 in)
- Weight: 58 kg (128 lb; 9 st 2 lb)

Cycling career
- Sport: Cycling
- Current team: UAE Team Emirates XRG
- Discipline: Road
- Role: Rider
- Rider type: Climber

Amateur teams
- 2011–2012: UVCA Troyes
- 2013: CC Etupes

Professional teams
- 2014–2020: Orica–GreenEDGE
- 2021–2022: INEOS Grenadiers
- 2023–: UAE Team Emirates

Major wins
- Grand Tours Tour de France Young rider classification (2016) 1 individual stage (2023) Vuelta a España 1 individual stage (2024) Stage races Tour de Romandie (2023) Tour de Suisse (2024) Volta a Catalunya (2021) UAE Tour (2020) Tour of Oman (2024, 2025) Deutschland Tour (2022) Tour of Turkey (2014) One-day races and Classics Clásica de San Sebastián (2015) GP de Montréal (2023) GP Industria & Artigianato (2014, 2017)

Adam Richard Yates (born 7 August 1992) is a British professional road and track racing cyclist who rides for UCI WorldTeam UAE Team Emirates XRG. Yates placed third overall at the 2023 Tour de France. In 2016 he became the first British rider to win the young rider classification, one year ahead of his twin brother Simon Yates.

Yates has taken more than twenty wins during his professional career, including overall victories at the 2021 Volta a Catalunya, the 2023 Tour de Romandie and the 2024 Tour de Suisse. He has also won a stage at the Tour de France, in 2023, and the one-day races Clásica de San Sebastián (2015) and the Grand Prix Cycliste de Montréal (2023).

== Early life and amateur career ==
Yates grew up in Bury in Greater Manchester and attended Derby High School.

Adam and Simon Yates took up cycling after their father John was injured in a collision with a car while riding – during his recovery he took the twins to Manchester Velodrome to track sessions run by his cycling club, Bury Clarion, to keep in touch with the other members. Both brothers soon started riding on the road for Bury Clarion and on the track for Eastlands Velo. Whilst Simon was selected for the British Cycling Olympic Academy programme, Adam pursued his road racing career in France with financial help from the Dave Rayner Fund.

Yates finished second by just 55 seconds to Spanish rider Rubén Fernández in the general classification of the 2013 Tour de l'Avenir while representing the British national team.

== Professional career ==
=== Orica–GreenEDGE (2014–2020) ===
==== 2014 ====
Having spent a successful season with French amateur team CC Etupes, he joined the Australian UCI World Tour team Orica–GreenEDGE along with his brother in 2014. In his first professional race, the Tour de San Luis in Argentina, Yates finished eleventh overall and first in the young rider classification.

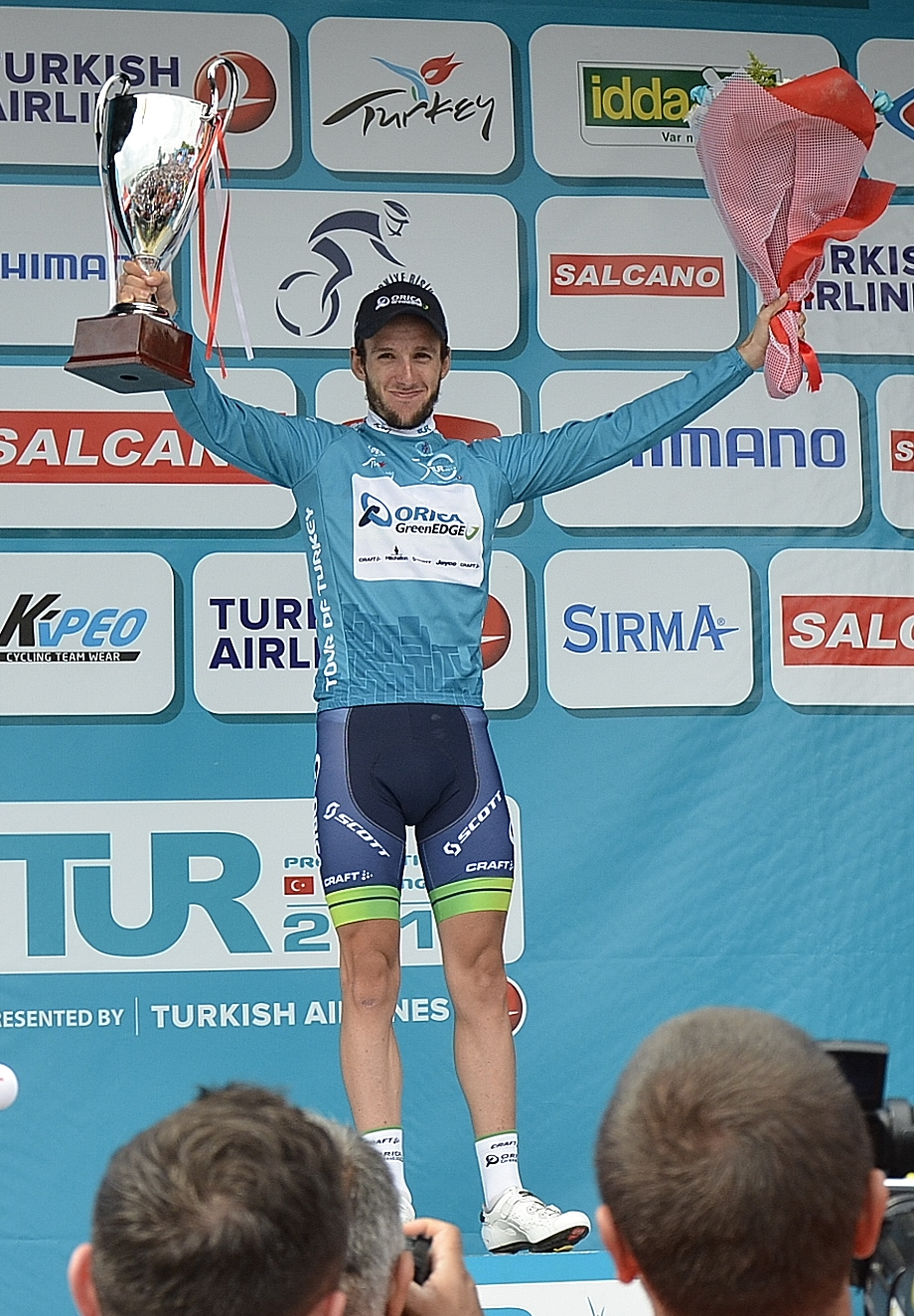
Yates at the 2014 Tour of Turkey, where he achieved his first professional victories

Yates's breakthrough results came at the Tour of Turkey in late April and early May 2014. He had been one of the team's protected riders for the general classification, along with his brother. On the third stage, he became the de facto team leader after Simon crashed out of the race. Yates was the only person to follow an attack by Rein Taaramäe on the final climb to Elmalı, and ultimately finished the stage in second place, six seconds down on Taaramäe after he had attacked again in the closing metres. After two stages that suited the sprinters, Yates achieved his first professional victory on the sixth stage, finishing at the House of the Virgin Mary in Selçuk. A reduced peloton had formed on the final climb from which Yates attacked with around a kilometre remaining. Yates held off the chasers – led home by Davide Formolo and Davide Rebellin, two seconds in arrears – and was able to take the leader's blue jersey from Taaramäe, who crossed the line seven seconds behind Yates. Yates held the race lead until its conclusion in Istanbul two days later; he extended his lead by a further four seconds on the final stage, as there was a split on the run-in, with only a 28-rider group being given the same time as stage winner, Mark Cavendish. He later described the victory – the first British overall win at the Tour of Turkey – as "unexpected", having set out with the ambition of winning stages.

Yates next competed at the Tour of California. After being passed on the road by Bradley Wiggins (Team Sky) on Stage 2, the 20-kilometre (12-mile) individual time trial around Folsom, he finished fourth on Stage 3, which finished on Mount Diablo, and fourth on Stage 6, which finished on Mountain High. Yates finished fifth overall in the general classification, 2 minutes and 14 seconds behind the winner, Wiggins. Yates's good form continued at the Critérium du Dauphiné, where he placed eighth on the first mountain top finish on Stage 2. He finished third on Stage 5 after launching a late attack with Wilco Kelderman (Belkin Pro Cycling), and again finished third on Stage 8, a mountain-top finish at Courchevel. Yates finished the UCI World Tour race sixth overall. Orica–GreenEDGE decided not to select Yates for the Tour de France. He returned to racing at the GP Industria & Artigianato di Larciano in July, which he won to take his first one-day professional victory. Yates made the lead group at the Clásica de San Sebastián with Alejandro Valverde (Movistar Team), Bauke Mollema (Belkin Pro Cycling), Joaquim Rodríguez (Team Katusha) and Mikel Nieve (Team Sky), but crashed heavily on a descent with 3.5 kilometres (2.2 miles) remaining, missing out on the chance of his first World Tour victory. He made his Grand Tour debut at the Vuelta a España, finishing 82nd overall.

==== 2015 ====
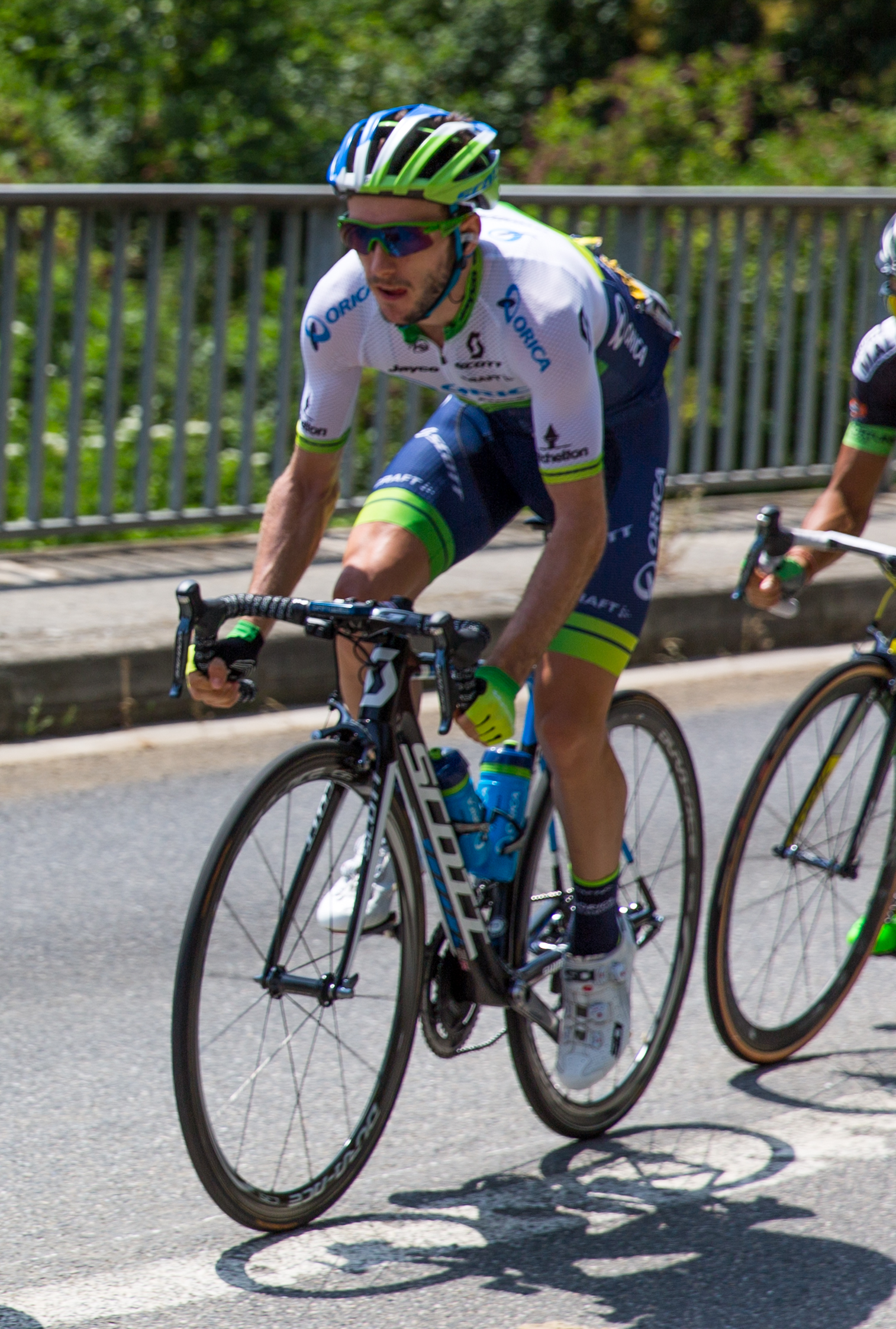
Yates at the 2015 Tour de France

Having finished ninth at Tirreno–Adriatico, Yates was named in the start list for the Tour de France. He finished seventh on Stage 8, which finished on the Mûr-de-Bretagne, and seventh on the first mountain stage, Stage 10, which finished on the Col de la Pierre St Martin in the Pyrenees. He added a further top-10 stage finish at the Pra-Loup ski resort, as he finished 50th overall. The week following the Tour de France, Yates took his biggest victory to that point by winning the Clásica de San Sebastián one-day race, after attacking on the final climb as leader Greg Van Avermaet of BMC Racing Team was involved in a crash with a race motorcycle, and holding off the chasers on the descent into San Sebastián. In the confusion after Van Avermaet's crash Yates did not realise he had won, so did not initially celebrate when crossing the finishing line. In September, Yates recorded podium finishes in two Canadian races held in consecutive weeks; he finished second overall to Bauke Mollema at the Tour of Alberta – winning the young rider classification in the process – before losing a sprint à deux against Tim Wellens at the Grand Prix Cycliste de Montréal, a result that still left him "pretty happy".

==== 2016 ====
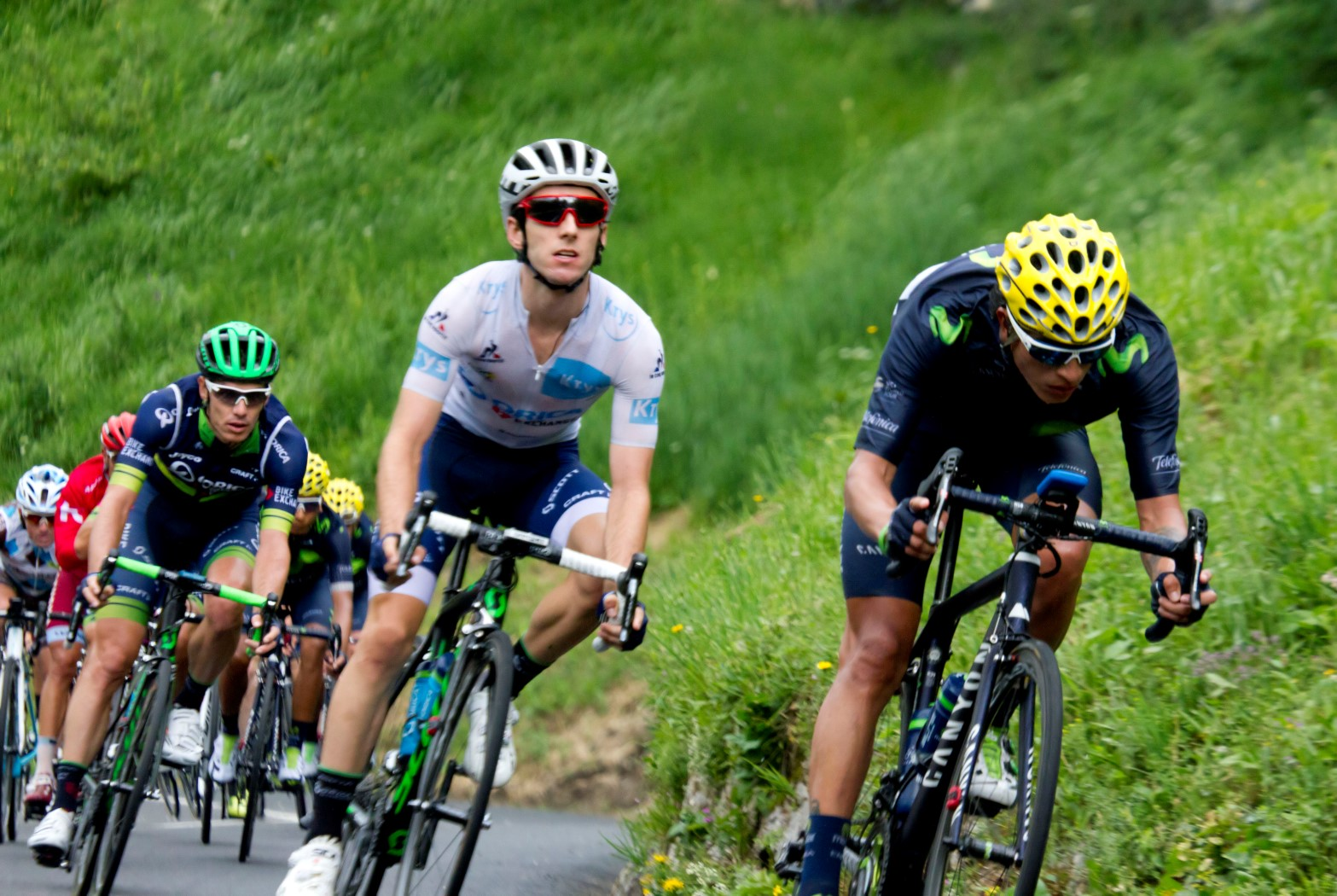
Yates (centre) wearing the white jersey as young rider classification leader, at the 2016 Tour de France

Yates was selected to ride the Tour de France for the second successive year, with his season's best result to that point being a fourth-place overall finish at the Tour de Yorkshire. On Stage 7, Yates broke clear of the leading group of general classification contenders on the descent of the Col d'Aspin, but was involved in an accident when the inflatable arch marking 1 kilometre (0.62 miles) remaining of the stage – the flamme rouge – deflated as he rode underneath it. Yates suffered cuts to his chin requiring stitches, but after the stage results were revised to give him the 7 second advantage he had over the peloton with 3 kilometres (1.9 miles) to go, Yates rose to second overall and took the white jersey as leader of the Young rider classification from Julian Alaphilippe (Etixx–Quick-Step). On Stage 9, at the race's first mountain top finish in Andorra, Yates finished tenth, leading home a select group of general classification contenders including Chris Froome (Team Sky), Nairo Quintana (Movistar Team), Richie Porte (BMC Racing Team) and Dan Martin (Etixx–Quick-Step). This meant Yates sat second overall going into the first rest day, 16 seconds behind Froome, and led the young rider classification by 39 seconds. Yates was thought to have moved into the yellow jersey on stage 12, which finished at Mont Ventoux, following an incident with a motorcycle on the final climb which delayed Froome, Porte and Bauke Mollema; the race jury later decided to give those riders the same time as Mollema – who finished 19 seconds ahead of Yates, meaning Froome actually extended his lead. Yates ultimately finished the Tour de France in 4th place, 21 seconds from a podium finish; he did, however, win the white jersey with a margin of 2 minutes, 16 seconds over Louis Meintjes (Lampre–Merida).

==== 2017–2018 ====
Yates started 2017 with a victory in March's GP Industria & Artigianato di Larciano for the second time in his career, ahead of Richard Carapaz and Rigoberto Urán. He had to abandon his next start – at Tirreno–Adriatico – while in second place overall, and he then finished in fourth place overall at the Volta a Catalunya, before making his first start at the Giro d'Italia. He ran as high as third overall following the first summit finish at Mount Etna on stage four, but lost almost five minutes five stages later on the stage to Blockhaus following a crash with a police motorbike, and dropped outside of the top ten. He worked his way back up to eighth, but lost a position to Bob Jungels on the final day individual time trial, which also determined the winner of the young rider classification. He rode the Vuelta a España for the first time since 2014, running as high as eighth overall – before losing more than nine minutes on stage eleven, which finished at the Calar Alto Observatory, removing him from overall contention. He finished the season with a second-place finish to Urán at Milano–Torino, who had attacked on the final ascent of the Superga climb.

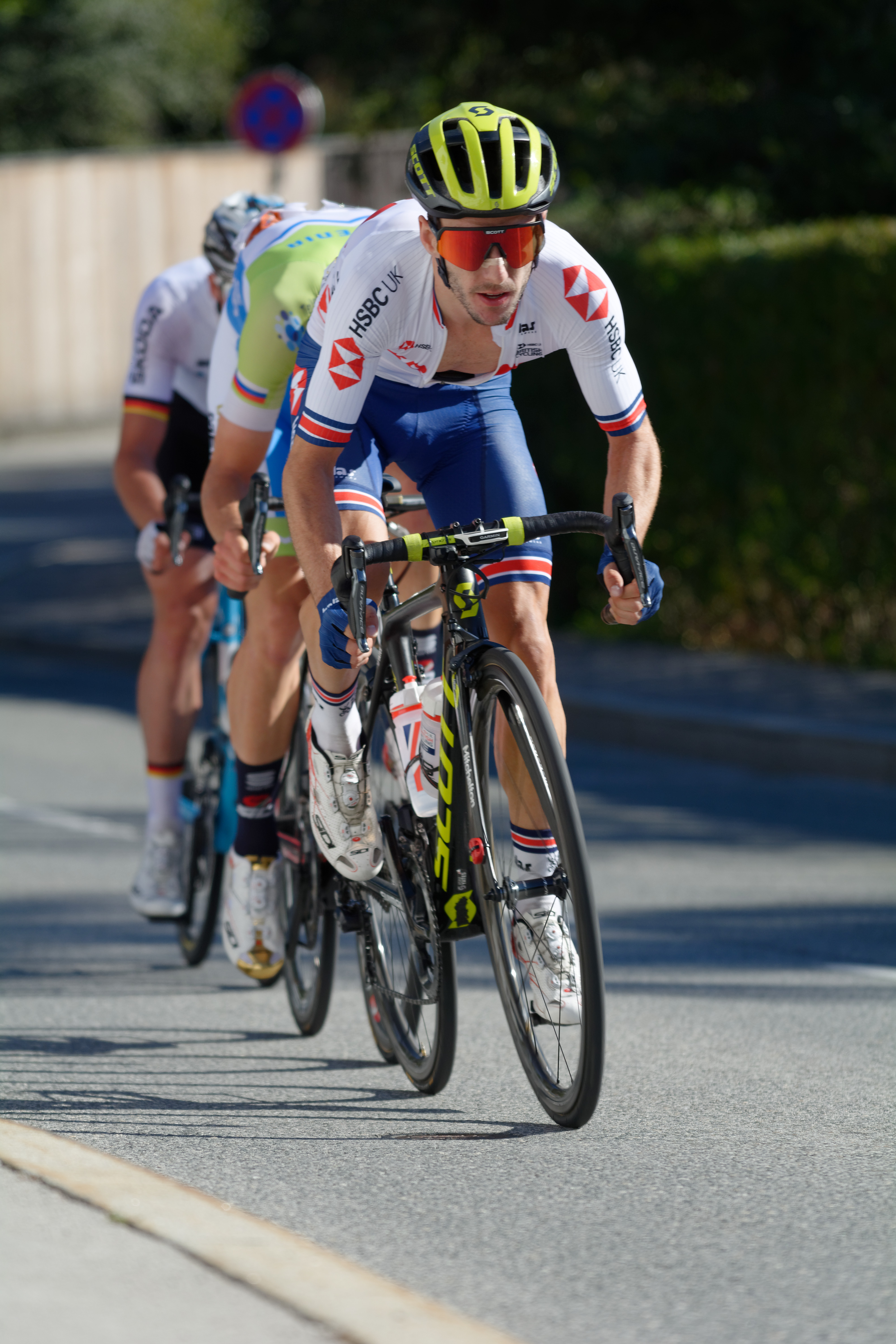
Yates riding for Great Britain at the 2018 UCI Road World Championships

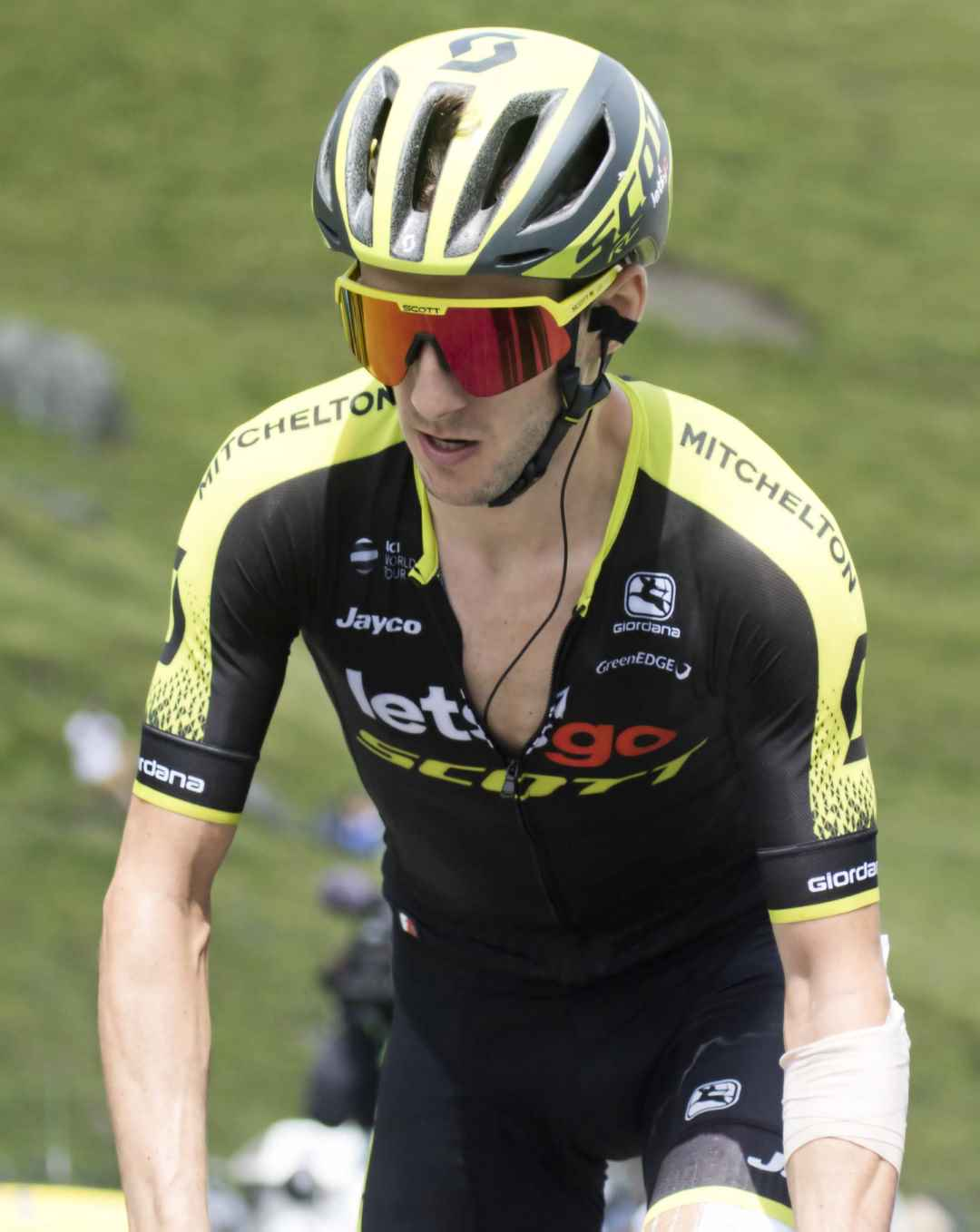
Yates at the 2018 Tour de France, where he was team leader for Mitchelton–Scott.

Having finished fourth overall at his first start of 2018, the Volta a la Comunitat Valenciana, Yates won a stage at March's Tirreno–Adriatico, attacking with around 4 kilometres (2.5 miles) remaining on the fifth stage, as he ultimately finished the race in fifth overall. After another fourth-place overall finish at the Tour of California following a two-month injury layoff, Yates came second in the general classification at the Critérium du Dauphiné, having won stage 7. He was Mitchelton–Scott's leader at the Tour de France but finished 29th in the general classification. He came third on stage 16, having crashed while in the lead on the final descent and was passed by mountains jersey wearer Julian Alaphilippe. He then rode the Vuelta a España in support of his brother Simon Yates, with both riders competing at the same Grand Tour for just the third time. Simon Yates ultimately became the second British rider to win the race overall, finishing 1 minute, 46 seconds clear of second-placed Enric Mas.

==== 2019–2020 ====
Yates finished second in the general classification at the 2019 Volta a Catalunya and won stage 3. Prior to this, he had finished second at Tirreno–Adriatico, losing the race by one second to Primož Roglič in a final stage individual time trial, and had also won a stage at the Volta a la Comunitat Valenciana. He won the final stage of the Tour of the Basque Country following a 3.5-kilometre (2.2-mile) solo move, as he finished fifth overall and won the mountains classification. Yates then recorded his best Monument result to that point, with a fourth-place finish at Liège–Bastogne–Liège, missing out on a podium in a sprint to Max Schachmann. He led the Critérium du Dauphiné for three days, and was within eight seconds of race leader Jakob Fuglsang going into the final day, but withdrew from the race due to illness. Yates was again the team leader for Mitchelton–Scott at the Tour de France, supported by his brother, but he repeated his 29th-place finish. He concluded his season in October with a stage win, the general classification and the mountains classification at the CRO Race, and a third-place finish at Milano–Torino.

Yates started his 2020 campaign at the UAE Tour, where he won the third stage – finishing at Jebel Hafeet – by more than a minute, to take the lead in the general classification. He then finished third on the fifth stage, which also finished on the same climb, behind Tadej Pogačar and Alexey Lutsenko. However, the race was then abandoned due to multiple positive tests for COVID-19, with Yates designated as the winner. With racing then suspended until August, the next race for Yates came at the Critérium du Dauphiné, ahead of the Tour de France. Yates took the yellow jersey in the latter for the first time in his career on stage five – becoming the ninth British rider to do so – after erstwhile leader Julian Alaphilippe received a post-stage time penalty for an illegal feed. He held the lead for four days, before losing almost a minute on stage nine, ceding the jersey to Roglič; he ultimately finished the race in ninth place overall, his first top-ten finish at the race since 2016.

=== Ineos Grenadiers (2021–2022) ===
In August 2020, Yates signed a two-year contract with INEOS Grenadiers, from the 2021 season.

==== 2021 ====
For the second consecutive year, he started his season with the UAE Tour, leading the INEOS Grenadiers team. Having made the lead group during the crosswinds on the opening stage, Yates finished second to Tadej Pogačar on the third stage after a sprint à deux on the summit finish at Jebel Hafeet. Yates maintained second overall for the remainder of the race, despite a crash on the final day. He then contested the Volta a Catalunya, winning at the Vallter 2000 ski resort for the second time in as many editions of the race, to take a 45-second overall lead ahead of teammate Richie Porte. Yates held this lead over Porte for the remainder of the race, with Geraint Thomas ultimately completing a podium lockout for the INEOS Grenadiers. Yates recorded a fourth-place overall finish at the Tour of the Basque Country, but rode neither the Giro d'Italia nor the Tour de France, as his focus was on the Vuelta a España.

He finished in ninth place in the road race at the COVID-19 pandemic-delayed Tokyo Olympics, as the last rider in the eight-rider chase group that determined the silver and bronze medals behind race winner Richard Carapaz. Riding the Vuelta a España for the first time since 2018, Yates moved into the top ten overall after stage seven, remaining there for the rest of the race; he went into the final 34-kilometre (21-mile) individual time trial stage exactly one minute from a podium finish, but lost further time to Jack Haig and ultimately finished fourth overall, his joint-best result in a Grand Tour to that point. In October he competed in the autumn Italian classics, finishing fourth in the Giro dell'Emilia, second in Milano–Torino, and third in Il Lombardia, where he outsprinted Primož Roglič in the chase group behind winner Pogačar and runner-up Fausto Masnada to take his first podium in a cycling monument. Following the end of his season, he ran the Barcelona Marathon the following month, completing the course in 2 hours, 58 minutes and 44 seconds.

==== 2022 ====
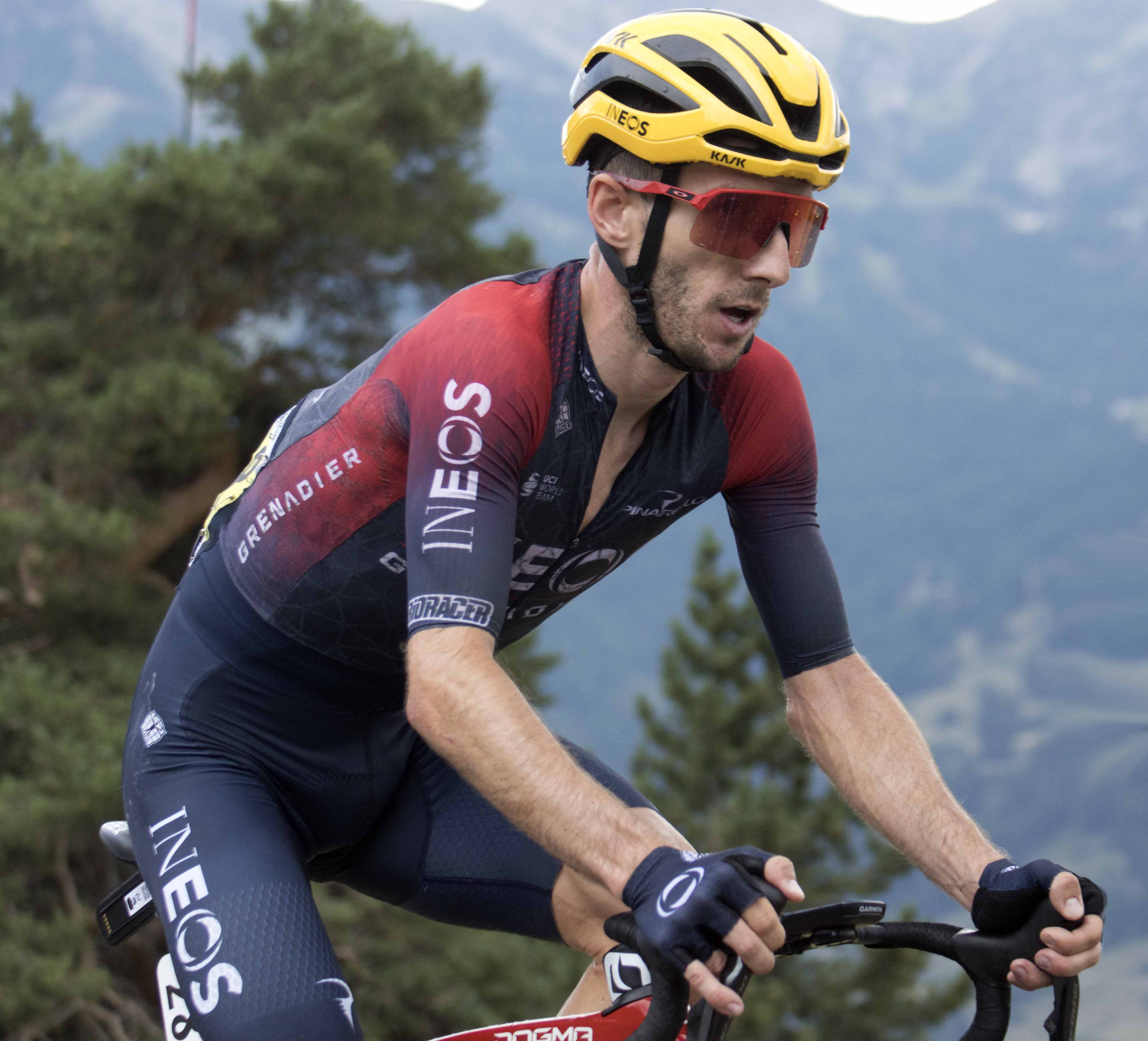
Yates at the 2022 Tour de France

Just as was the case in 2021, Yates finished second to Tadej Pogačar at the UAE Tour, with a pair of second-place stage finishes (both to Pogačar) on uphill finishes at Jebel Jais and Jebel Hafeet. He finished fourth overall at Paris–Nice, but withdrew from his next two starts at the Tour of the Basque Country, and the Tour de Suisse (due to a positive test for COVID-19). This affected his preparations for the Tour de France, but he worked his way into the top-five overall as the race headed into the Vosges and Alps. He dropped from fifth to tenth in the Pyrenees over consecutive days due to sickness, but ultimately finished the race in ninth overall, following the disqualification of Nairo Quintana. His final stage race of the season was at the Deutschland Tour in August, where he won the penultimate stage and the general classification. He concluded the season with five one-day races in Canada and Italy, recording a best finish of fourth place at the Grand Prix Cycliste de Montréal.

=== UAE Team Emirates (2023–) ===
==== 2023 ====
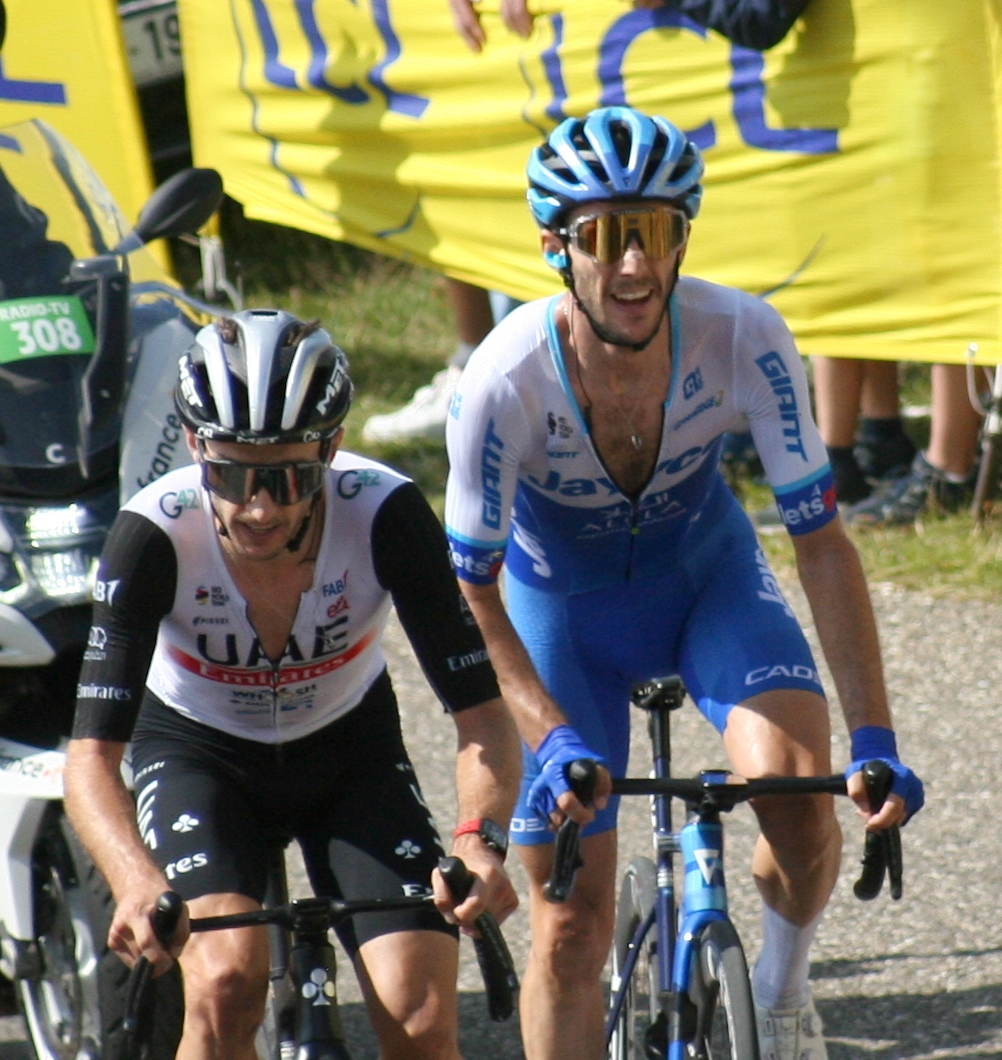
Adam Yates leading his brother Simon Yates at the 2023 Tour de France. On the opening stage of the race, they finished first and second in Bilbao, becoming the third pair of brothers to record such a result at the Tour de France.

Yates transferred to UAE Team Emirates for the 2023 season, having signed a three-year contract with the team. He made his first start with the team (as team leader) at the UAE Tour, with two-time defending race winner Tadej Pogačar electing to ride in Spain instead. Yates won the final stage of the race, finishing at Jebel Hafeet; he moved up from tenth overall to a podium finish, exactly one minute behind race winner Remco Evenepoel. On the penultimate stage of the Tour de Romandie, his teammate and race leader Juan Ayuso was dropped around halfway up the final climb to Thyon, and Yates attacked with around 4 kilometres (2.5 miles) remaining; he ultimately won the stage by 7 seconds, ahead of Thibaut Pinot, and took the race lead by 19 seconds, ahead of Matteo Jorgenson – a margin he would hold onto through the final stage into Geneva. He then finished second overall at the Critérium du Dauphiné, but was more than two minutes down on the race winner, Jonas Vingegaard.

At the Tour de France, Yates and Pogačar were designated as co-team leaders for UAE Team Emirates, with Pogačar having missed six weeks of racing due to injuries suffered at Liège–Bastogne–Liège. On the opening stage held in and around Bilbao in the Basque Country, the Yates brothers joined forces on the descent from the Pike Bidea climb to pull clear of their rivals, with Adam going clear at 350 metres (1,150 feet) remaining, and pulled out a four-second gap on Simon for victory – they became the third set of brothers to finish 1–2 on a Tour de France stage, after the Pélissiers (Francis and Henri) and the Schlecks (Andy and Fränk). He held the race lead until stage five, when Jai Hindley took the jersey following a 20-kilometre (12-mile) solo move into Laruns. Yates dropped no lower than sixth overall during the race, and worked his way back up to third, following the race's only individual time trial in the Alps during the final week. This was where Vingegaard pulled clear of Pogačar in the general classification, with Pogačar cracking on stage 17 to Courchevel; Yates was Pogačar's last helper on the Col de la Loze, but Pogačar was distanced and Yates would ultimately gain back almost four minutes on Pogačar. At the same time, Yates lost almost two minutes to Vingegaard, but solidified his third place from Carlos Rodríguez, a position he would hold until the end of the race.

He then finished third overall at August's Vuelta a Burgos, also winning the mountains classification. At the Grand Prix Cycliste de Montréal in September, Yates made a move on the final lap of the race and only Pavel Sivakov was able to follow him. After initially dropping Sivakov, the two riders fought out the sprint which Yates took, for his fifth victory of the season.

==== 2024 ====
Yates started the 2024 season with a campaign in the Middle East, where he won the fifth and final stage of the Tour of Oman, which moved him up from eighth to first overall. He next competed at the UAE Tour, but dropped out on stage three. In June, Yates came in first overall in the Tour de Suisse; additionally he won stages 5 and 7, as well as the mountain and points classifications in the race. He then came 6th overall at the Tour de France. After his teammate João Almeida withdrew from the 2024 La Vuelta a España after stage 8 after contracting COVID, Yates won stage 9 in a convincing solo victory, attacking from the breakaway with 58 km to go and climbing the final two mountains of the stage on his own to finish over a minute and a half ahead of Richard Carapaz in second, and almost four minutes ahead of the red jersey group, which contained race leader Ben O'Connor and GC favourite Primož Roglič. This effort also won him 22 points in the King of the Mountains category, and he took the polka-dot jersey from Roglič after stage 9 despite having no points in the category prior to the stage. He lost the jersey to Wout van Aert after stage 13, as van Aert was able to win several points in the category from the breakaway.

== Major results ==
=== Road ===
2009
5th Road race, National Junior Championships
2013
2nd Overall Tour de l'Avenir
2nd Grand Prix de Soultz–sous–Forêts
3rd Overall Tour de Franche-Comté

1st Stage 3

8th Paris–Troyes
2014 (3 pro wins)
1st Overall Tour of Turkey

1st Stage 6

1st GP Industria & Artigianato di Larciano
1st Young rider classification, Tour de San Luis
5th Overall Tour of California
5th Giro di Toscana
6th Overall Critérium du Dauphiné
2015 (1)
1st Clásica de San Sebastián
2nd Overall Tour of Alberta

1st Young rider classification

2nd Grand Prix Cycliste de Montréal
9th Overall Tirreno–Adriatico
2016
4th Overall Tour de France

1st Young rider classification

4th Overall Tour de Yorkshire
6th La Drôme Classic
7th Overall Critérium du Dauphiné
7th Classic Sud-Ardèche
2017 (1)
1st GP Industria & Artigianato di Larciano
2nd Milano–Torino
4th Overall Volta a Catalunya
5th Overall Tour de Pologne
8th Liège–Bastogne–Liège
9th Overall Giro d'Italia

Held after Stages 18–20

9th Prueba Villafranca de Ordizia
2018 (2)
2nd Overall Critérium du Dauphiné

1st Stage 7

4th Overall Tour of California
4th Overall Volta a la Comunitat Valenciana
5th Overall Tirreno–Adriatico

1st Stage 5

2019 (5)
1st Overall CRO Race

1st Mountains classification
1st Stage 5

2nd Overall Volta a Catalunya

1st Stage 3

2nd Overall Tirreno–Adriatico

1st Stage 1 (TTT)

3rd Milano–Torino
4th Liège–Bastogne–Liège
5th Overall Tour of the Basque Country

1st Mountains classification
1st Stage 6

5th Overall Vuelta a Andalucía
8th Overall Volta a la Comunitat Valenciana

1st Stage 4

2020 (2)
1st Overall UAE Tour

1st Stage 3

9th Overall Tour de France

Held after Stages 5–8

2021 (2)
1st Overall Volta a Catalunya

1st Stage 3

2nd Overall UAE Tour
2nd Milano–Torino
3rd Giro di Lombardia
4th Overall Vuelta a España
4th Overall Tour of the Basque Country
4th Giro dell'Emilia
9th Road race, Olympic Games
2022 (2)
1st Overall Deutschland Tour

1st Stage 3

2nd Overall UAE Tour
4th Overall Paris–Nice
4th Grand Prix Cycliste de Montréal
6th Tre Valli Varesine
7th Grand Prix Cycliste de Québec
9th Overall Tour de France
10th Giro di Lombardia
2023 (5)
1st Overall Tour de Romandie

1st Stage 4

1st Grand Prix Cycliste de Montréal
2nd Overall Critérium du Dauphiné
3rd Overall Tour de France

1st Stage 1
Held after Stages 1–4
Held after Stage 1
Combativity award Stage 1

3rd Overall UAE Tour

1st Stage 7

3rd Overall Vuelta a Burgos

1st Mountains classification

6th Giro di Lombardia
9th Giro dell'Emilia
2024 (6)
1st Overall Tour de Suisse

1st Points classification
1st Mountains classification
1st Stages 5 & 7

1st Overall Tour of Oman

1st Stage 5

Vuelta a España

1st Stage 9
Held after Stages 9–12
Combativity award Stage 9

4th Overall Giro d'Abruzzo
6th Overall Tour de France
2025 (3)
1st Overall Tour of Oman
1st Coppa Agostoni
1st Trofeo Tessile & Moda
4th Milano–Torino
5th Grand Prix Cycliste de Montréal
9th Giro dell'Emilia
2026 (2)
1st Overall O Gran Camiño

1st Stage 4

2nd Muscat Classic
3rd Overall Tour of Oman
8th Giro dell'Emilia

==== General classification results timeline ====
Grand Tour general classification results
Grand Tour	2014	2015	2016	2017	2018	2019	2020	2021	2022	2023	2024	2025	2026
Giro d'Italia	—	—	—	9	—	—	—	—	—	—	—	12	DNF
Tour de France	—	50	4	—	29	29	9	—	9	3	6	24	21
Vuelta a España	82	—	—	34	45	—	—	4	—	—	12	—	—
Major stage race general classification results
Major stage race	2014	2015	2016	2017	2018	2019	2020	2021	2022	2023	2024	2025	2026
Paris–Nice	—	—	—	—	—	—	—	—	4	—	—	—	—
Tirreno–Adriatico	—	9	19	DNF	5	2	—	—	—	11	—	16	—
Volta a Catalunya	23	—	—	4	DNF	2	NH	1	—	28	—	32	—
Tour of the Basque Country	76	DNF	32	—	—	5	NH	4	DNF	—	—	—	—
Tour de Romandie	—	—	—	—	—	—	NH	—	—	1	13	—	—
Critérium du Dauphiné	6	20	7	—	2	DNF	17	—	—	2	—	—	—
Tour de Suisse	—	—	—	—	—	—	NH	—	DNF	—	1	—	—

==== Classics results timeline ====
Monument	2014	2015	2016	2017	2018	2019	2020	2021	2022	2023	2024	2025	2026
Milan–San Remo	Has not contested during his career												
Tour of Flanders	Has not contested during his career												
Paris–Roubaix	Has not contested during his career												
Liège–Bastogne–Liège	—	—	56	8	—	4	DNF	18	—	—	—	—	—
Giro di Lombardia	DNF	56	—	74	29	15	—	3	10	6	81	11	
Classic	2014	2015	2016	2017	2018	2019	2020	2021	2022	2023	2024	2025	2026
Milano–Torino	—	—	—	2	14	3	—	2	—	—	—	4	—
Amstel Gold Race	—	—	DNF	—	—	—	NH	—	—	—	—	—	—
La Flèche Wallonne	97	—	DNF	—	—	DNF	—	20	—	—	—	—	—
Clásica de San Sebastián	43	1	16	—	—	DNF	NH	27	—	—	—	—	—
Grand Prix Cycliste de Québec	—	32	72	—	—	21	NH	NH	7	17	—	28	56
Grand Prix Cycliste de Montréal	—	2	DNF	—	—	14	NH	NH	4	1	—	5	13
Giro dell'Emilia	—	—	DNF	29	—	—	—	4	DNF	9	12	9	8
Tre Valli Varesine	—	—	—	—	—	—	NH	—	6	63	—		

==== Major championships results timeline ====
Event		2011	2012	2013	2014	2015	2016	2017	2018	2019	2020	2021	2022	2023	2024	2025	2026
Olympic Games	Road race	NH	—	Not held			15	Not held				9	Not held		—	Not held	
World Championships	Road race	—	—	—	DNF	57	—	—	37	DNF	—	—	—	—	30	—	31
National Championships	Road race	24	23	DNF	6	DNF	—	—	—	—	—	—	—	—	—	—	—

Legend
—	Did not compete
DNF	Did not finish
NH	Not held

=== Track ===
2009
3rd Madison, National Junior Championships (with Simon Yates)
2010
1st Madison, National Junior Championships (with Simon Yates)
2011
National Championships

2nd Team pursuit
3rd Omnium
3rd Scratch

2012
3rd Scratch, National Championships
