= 2017 GP Industria & Artigianato di Larciano =

2017 UCI Europe Tour

Race details
- Dates: 5 March 2017
- Stages: 1
- Distance: 199.2 km (123.8 mi)
- Winning time: 4h 51' 00"

Results
	Winner	Adam Yates (GBR)
	Second	Richard Carapaz (ECU)
	Third	Rigoberto Urán (COL)

The 2017 GP Industria & Artigianato di Larciano was the 49th edition of the GP Industria & Artigianato di Larciano road cycling one day race. It was held on 5 March 2017 as part of UCI Europe Tour in category 1.HC.

== Teams ==
Nineteen teams of up to eight riders started the race:

UCI WorldTeams

- Bahrain–Merida
- Cannondale–Drapac
- Movistar Team
- UAE Team Emirates
- Bora–Hansgrohe
- Team Katusha–Alpecin
- Orica–Scott

UCI Professional Continental teams

- Gazprom–RusVelo
- Team Novo Nordisk
- Bardiani–CSF
- Nippo–Vini Fantini
- Wilier Triestina–Selle Italia
- Androni Giocattoli–Sidermec

UCI Continental teams

- 0711 / Cycling
- GM Europa Ovini
- Unieuro Trevigiani–Hemus 1896
- D'Amico Utensilnord
- Sangemini–MG.K Vis

National team

- Italy

== Result ==
Final general classification

Rank	Rider	Team	Time
1	Adam Yates (GBR)	Orica–Scott	4h 51' 00"
2	Richard Carapaz (ECU)	Movistar Team	s.t.
3	Rigoberto Urán (COL)	Cannondale–Drapac	s.t.
4	Mattia Cattaneo (ITA)	Androni Giocattoli–Sidermec	+ 3"
5	Egan Bernal (COL)	Androni Giocattoli–Sidermec	s.t.
6	Simon Clarke (AUS)	Cannondale–Drapac	+ 5"
7	Francesco Gavazzi (ITA)	Androni Giocattoli–Sidermec	s.t.
8	Filippo Pozzato (ITA)	Wilier Triestina–Selle Italia	+ 18"
9	Paolo Totò (ITA)	Sangemini–MG.K Vis	s.t.
10	José Joaquín Rojas (ESP)	Movistar Team	s.t.
