= Trofeo Tessile & Moda =

Annual one-day cycling race

Race details
- Date: October
- Region: Piedmont
- Discipline: Road
- Competition: UCI Europe Tour
- Type: One-day race

History
- First edition: 2025
- Editions: 1
- First winner: Adam Yates (GBR)
- Most wins: No repeat winners
- Most recent: Adam Yates (GBR)

The Trofeo Tessile & Moda is a one-day road cycling race held annually since 2025 in Piedmont, Italy. It is part of the UCI Europe Tour calendar as a 1.1 rated event.

== Winners ==
Year	Country	Rider	Team
2025	Great Britain	Adam Yates	UAE Team Emirates XRG
