= Mattia Pozzo =

Italian cyclist

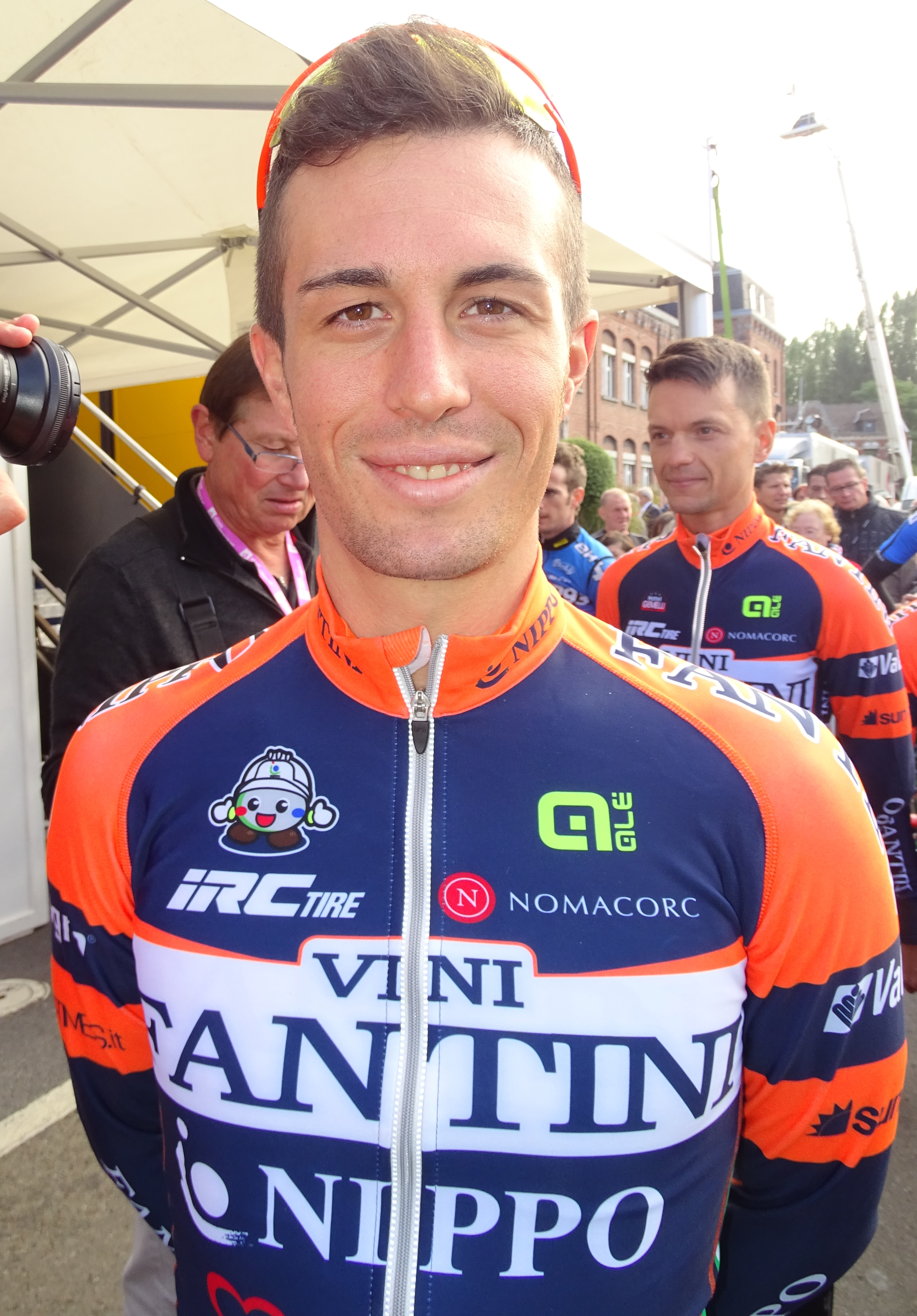
- Pozzo in September 2015

Personal information
- Born: 26 January 1989 (age 37) Biella, Italy

Cycling career
- Sport: Cycling
- Current team: Retired
- Discipline: Road
- Role: Rider

Professional teams
- 2013–2014: Vini Fantini–Selle Italia
- 2015: Nippo–Vini Fantini

Mattia Pozzo (born 26 January 1989) is an Italian former professional racing cyclist.

== Major results ==
2008
1st Stage 3 Giro della Valle d'Aosta
2011
1st Trofeo Edil C
2012
1st Stage 9 Giro Ciclistico d'Italia
2013
1st Prologue & Stage 3 Tour de Kumano
2014
1st Turkish Beauties Classification, Tour of Turkey
