= 2017 Milano–Torino =

98th Milano–Torino cycling classic

2017 UCI Europe Tour

Race details
- Dates: 5 October 2017
- Stages: 1
- Distance: 186 km (115.6 mi)
- Winning time: 4h 24' 51"

Results
	Winner	Rigoberto Urán (COL)
	Second	Adam Yates (GBR)
	Third	Fabio Aru (ITA)

The 98th Milano–Torino cycling classic was held on 5 October 2017 over a distance of 186 km (116 mi), between San Giuliano Milanese and Turin. The race was rated as a 1.HC event on the 2017 UCI Europe Tour and was won by Colombian rider Rigoberto Urán of the Cannondale–Drapac team.

== Teams ==
Nineteen teams of up to eight riders started the race:

UCI WorldTeams

- AG2R La Mondiale
- Bahrain–Merida
- FDJ
- Orica–Scott
- Team Katusha–Alpecin
- Team Sky
- Trek–Segafredo
- Astana
- Cannondale–Drapac
- Movistar Team
- Quick-Step Floors
- LottoNL–Jumbo
- Team Sunweb
- UAE Team Emirates

UCI Professional Continental teams

- Cofidis
- Wilier Triestina–Selle Italia
- Bardiani–CSF
- Nippo–Vini Fantini
- Androni Giocattoli–Sidermec

== result ==
Final general classification

Rank	Rider	Team	Time
1	Rigoberto Urán (COL)	Astana	4h 24' 51"
2	Adam Yates (GBR)	Orica–Scott	+ 10"
3	Fabio Aru (ITA)	Astana	+ 20"
4	Nairo Quintana (COL)	Movistar Team	+ 28"
5	David Gaudu (FRA)	FDJ	+ 31"
6	Wout Poels (NED)	Team Sky	s.t.
7	Daniel Martínez (COL)	Wilier Triestina–Selle Italia	+ 33"
8	Thibaut Pinot (FRA)	FDJ	+ 35"
9	Pierre Latour (FRA)	AG2R La Mondiale	+ 43"
10	Peter Stetina (USA)	Trek–Segafredo	+ 53"
