= 2012 Gran Piemonte =

2012 UCI Europe Tour

Race details
- Dates: September 27
- Stages: 1
- Distance: 188 km (116.8 mi)
- Winning time: 4h 30' 21"

Results
	Winner	Rigoberto Urán (Colombia)	(Team Sky)
	Second	Luca Paolini (Italy)	(Team Katusha)
	Third	Gorka Verdugo (Spain)	(Euskaltel–Euskadi)

The 2012 Gran Piemonte was the 98th edition of the Gran Piemonte (known as Giro del Piemonte until 2009) single-day cycling race. It was held on 27 September 2012, over a distance of 188 km, starting in Fossano and ending in Biella.

The race was won by Rigoberto Urán, Colombian rider of Team Sky. Luca Paolini of Team Katusha was runner-up (he was third in the 2011 edition) and Euskaltel–Euskadi's Gorka Verdugo was third-placed.

== Teams ==
The start list included 18 teams, with 11 ProTour teams, and more than 150 riders. Among them, the 2008 World Champion Alessandro Ballan, the 2012 Giro d'Italia winner Ryder Hesjedal, the 2006 Milano-Sanremo winner Filippo Pozzato, and the 2008 Olympic Champion Samuel Sánchez.

- Androni Giocattoli–Venezuela
- Argos–Shimano
- Acqua & Sapone
- Astana
- BMC Racing Team
- Colnago–CSF Bardiani
- Colombia–Coldeportes
- Euskaltel–Euskadi
- Farnese Vini–Selle Italia
- Garmin–Sharp
- Team Katusha
- Lampre–ISD
- Liquigas–Cannondale
- Movistar Team
- RadioShack–Nissan
- Utensilnord–Named
- Team Sky
- Saxo Bank–Tinkoff Bank

== Results ==
	Cyclist	Team	Time
1	Rigoberto Urán (COL)	Team Sky	4h 30' 21"
2	Luca Paolini (ITA)	Team Katusha	+ 6"
3	Gorka Verdugo (ESP)	Euskaltel–Euskadi	+ 7"
4	Sergio Henao (COL)	Team Sky	+ 11"
5	Carlos Betancur (COL)	Acqua & Sapone	+ 11"
6	Mauro Santambrogio (ITA)	BMC Racing Team	+ 11"
7	Daniele Bennati (ITA)	RadioShack–Nissan	+ 27"
8	Greg Van Avermaet (BEL)	BMC Racing Team	+ 27"
9	Giovanni Visconti (ITA)	Movistar Team	+ 27"
10	Simone Ponzi (ITA)	Astana	+ 27"
