= 2016 Milano–Torino =

97th edition of the Milano–Torino cycling classic

2016 UCI Europe Tour

Race details
- Dates: 28 September 2016
- Stages: 1
- Distance: 186 km (115.6 mi)
- Winning time: 4h 13' 36"

Results
	Winner	Miguel Ángel López (COL)
	Second	Michael Woods (CAN)
	Third	Rigoberto Urán (COL)

The 97th edition of the Milano–Torino cycling classic was held on 28 September 2016. The race covered a distance of 186 km (116 mi), starting in San Giuliano Milanese, near Milan, and ending on the Colle di Superga, near Turin. Colombian rider Miguel Ángel López won the race after a late attack on the Superga Hill. Canadian Michael Woods was second, Rigoberto Urán finished in the third place.

== Teams ==
Eighteen teams of up to eight riders started the race:

UCI WorldTeams

- AG2R La Mondiale
- BMC Racing Team
- Lampre–Merida
- Team Giant–Alpecin
- Team Sky
- Trek–Segafredo
- Astana
- Movistar Team
- Team Katusha
- Tinkoff
- Cannondale–Drapac

UCI Professional Continental teams

- Androni Giocattoli–Sidermec
- Caja Rural–Seguros RGA
- Gazprom–RusVelo
- Bardiani–CSF
- CCC–Sprandi–Polkowice
- Nippo–Vini Fantini
- Wilier Triestina–Southeast

== result ==
Final general classification

Rank	Rider	Team	Time
1	Miguel Ángel López (COL)	Astana	4h 13' 36"
2	Michael Woods (CAN)	Cannondale–Drapac	+ 9"
3	Rigoberto Urán (COL)	Cannondale–Drapac	+ 14"
4	Daniel Moreno (ESP)	Movistar Team	+ 19"
5	Diego Ulissi (ITA)	Lampre–Merida	+ 21"
6	Fabio Aru (ITA)	Astana	+ 23"
7	Pello Bilbao (ESP)	Caja Rural–Seguros RGA	+ 27"
8	Rodolfo Torres (COL)	Androni Giocattoli–Sidermec	+ 32"
9	Romain Bardet (FRA)	AG2R La Mondiale	+ 36"
10	Warren Barguil (FRA)	Team Giant–Alpecin	+ 40"
