= 2023 Grand Prix Cycliste de Montréal =

One-day cycling race in Canada

2023 UCI World Tour, race 33 of 35

Race details
- Dates: 10 September 2023
- Stages: 1
- Distance: 221.4 km (137.6 mi)
- Winning time: 5h 54' 03"

Results
	Winner	Adam Yates (GBR)	(UAE Team Emirates)
	Second	Pavel Sivakov (FRA)	(Ineos Grenadiers)
	Third	Alex Aranburu (ESP)	(Movistar Team)

The 2023 Grand Prix Cycliste de Montreal was a road cycling one-day race that took place on 10 September 2023 in Montréal, Canada. It was the 12th edition of the Grand Prix Cycliste de Montréal and the 33rd event of the 2023 UCI World Tour. The race was won by British rider Adam Yates of UAE Team Emirates.

== Teams ==
All eighteen UCI WorldTeams, four UCI ProTeams, and the Canadian national team made up the twenty-three teams that participated in the race.

UCI WorldTeams

- AG2R Citroën Team
- Alpecin–Deceuninck
- Arkéa–Samsic
- Astana Qazaqstan Team
- Bora–Hansgrohe
- Cofidis
- EF Education–EasyPost
- Groupama–FDJ
- Ineos Grenadiers
- Intermarché–Circus–Wanty
- Lidl–Trek
- Movistar Team
- Soudal–Quick-Step
- Team Bahrain Victorious
- Team dsm–firmenich
- Team Jayco–AlUla
- Team Jumbo–Visma
- UAE Team Emirates

UCI ProTeams

- Israel–Premier Tech
- Lotto–Dstny
- Team Novo Nordisk
- Tudor Pro Cycling Team

National Teams

- Canada

== Course ==
The race used a hilly 12.3 kilometres (7.6 mi) circuit around Mount Royal, with the longest climb being Côte Camilien-Houde (1.8 km long and 8% average grade). 18 laps of the circuit made the race 221.4 kilometres (137.6 mi) in length, with 4,842 metres (15,886 ft) of cumulative climbing during the race. This is similar to that found in a mountain stage in the Tour de France, though at a lower altitude.

== Result ==
Result
Rank	Rider	Team	Time
1	Adam Yates (GBR)	UAE Team Emirates	5h 54' 03"
2	Pavel Sivakov (FRA)	Ineos Grenadiers	+ 2"
3	Alex Aranburu (ESP)	Movistar Team	+ 11"
4	Valentin Madouas (FRA)	Groupama–FDJ	+ 11"
5	Simone Velasco (ITA)	Astana Qazaqstan Team	+ 11"
6	Simon Yates (GBR)	Team Jayco–AlUla	+ 11"
7	Ben O'Connor (AUS)	AG2R Citroën Team	+ 17"
8	Ion Izagirre (ESP)	Cofidis	+ 24"
9	Mattias Skjelmose (DEN)	Lidl–Trek	+ 29"
10	Marc Hirschi (SUI)	UAE Team Emirates	+ 29"
