= 2014 Tour of Turkey =

2014 UCI Europe Tour

Race details
- Dates: 27 April – 4 May 2014
- Stages: 8
- Distance: 1,243.6 km (772.7 mi)
- Winning time: 30h 26' 22"

Results
Jersey awarded to the overall winner	Winner	Adam Yates (GBR)	(Orica–GreenEDGE)
	Second	Rein Taaramäe (EST)	(Cofidis)
	Third	Romain Hardy (FRA)	(Cofidis)
Jersey awarded to the points classification winner	Points	Mark Cavendish (GBR)	(Omega Pharma–Quick-Step)
Jersey awarded to the mountains classification winner	Mountains	Marc de Maar (CUR)	(UnitedHealthcare)
Jersey awarded to the sprints classification winner	Sprints	Mattia Pozzo (ITA)	(Neri Sottoli)
	Team	Cofidis	

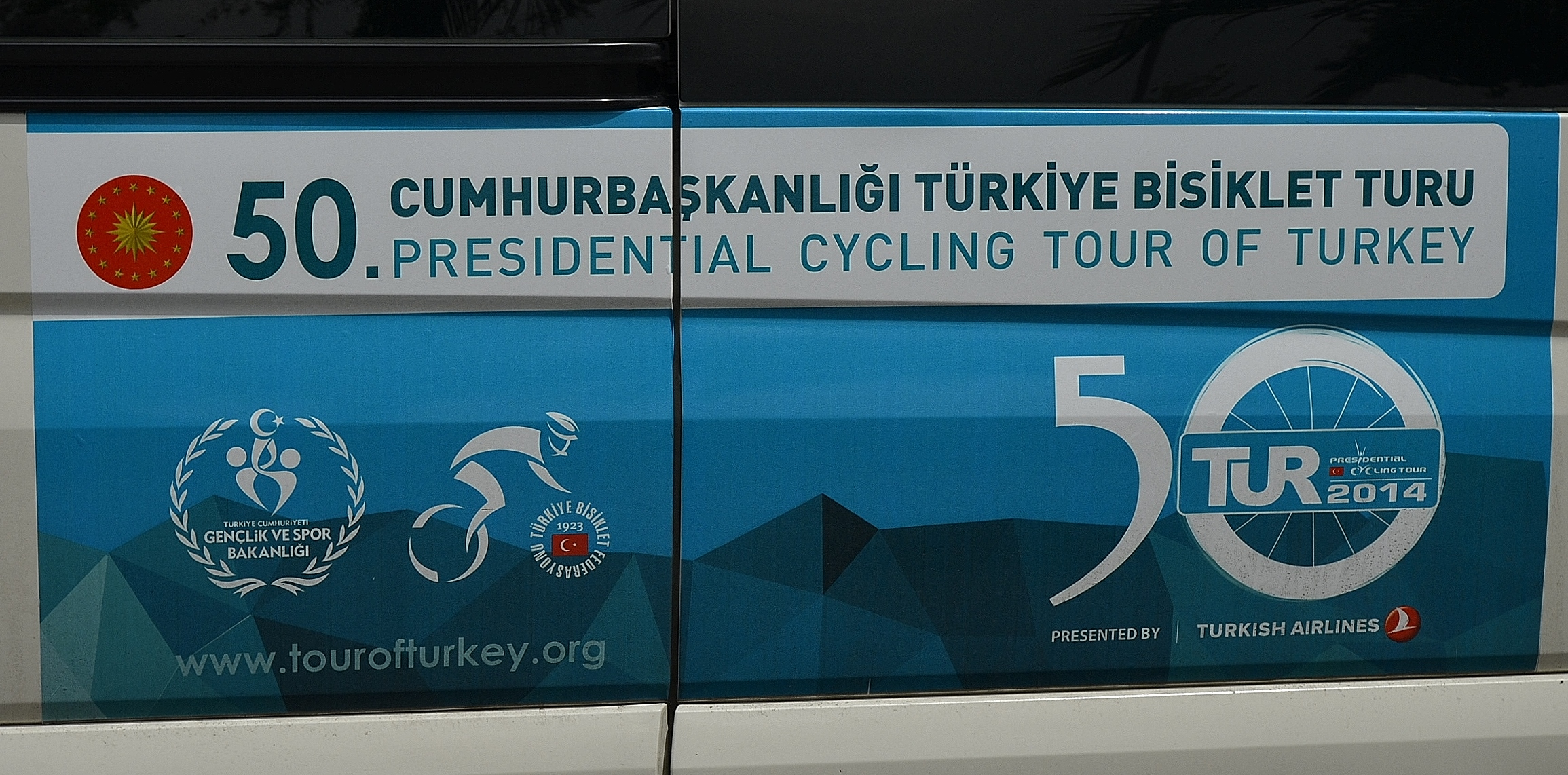
Logo of the 50th Presidential Cycling Tour of Turkey on an official car.

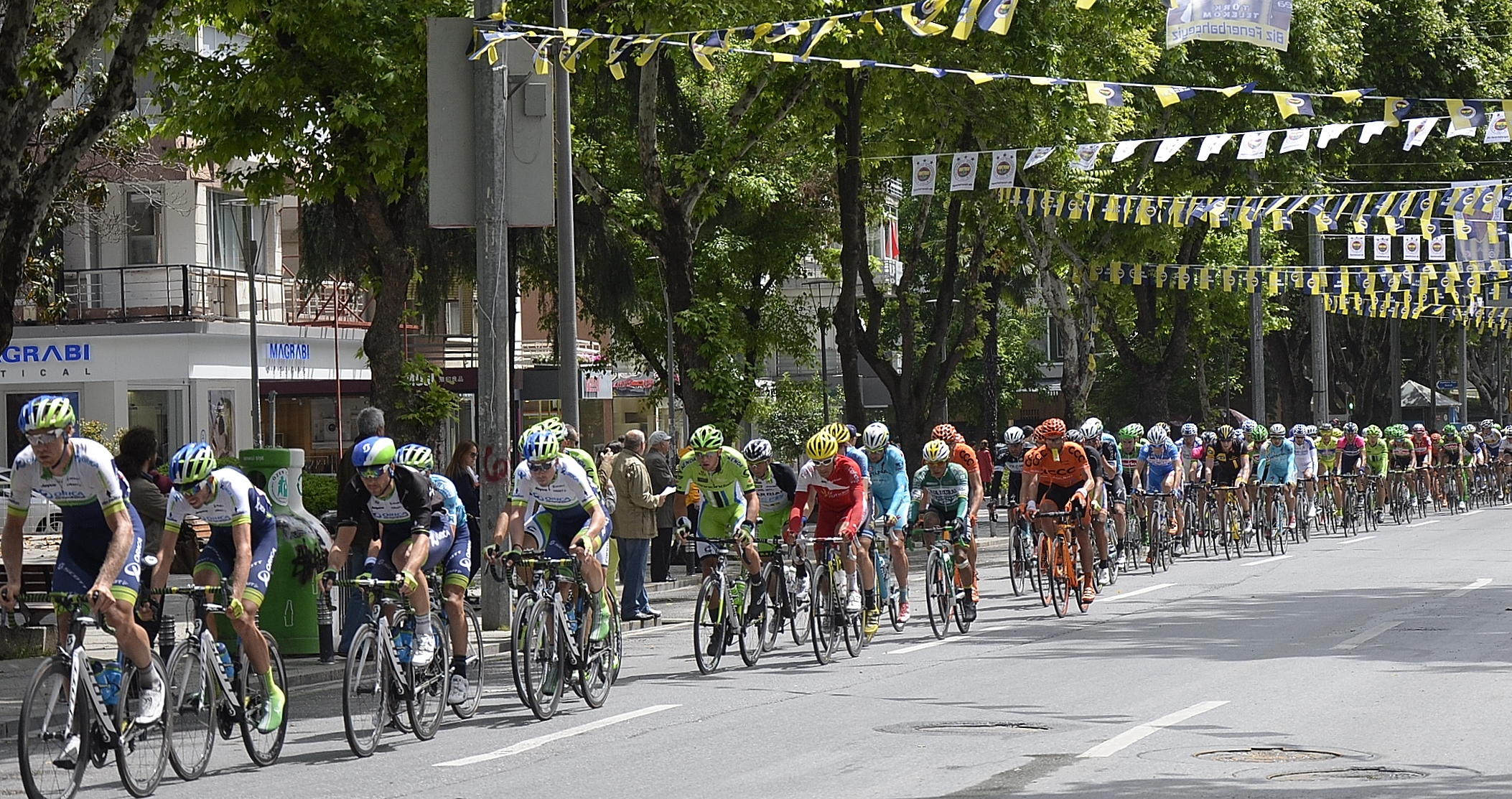
Riders in Stage 8 at Bağdat Avenue.

The 2014 Tour of Turkey was the 50th edition of the Presidential Cycling Tour of Turkey cycling stage race. It was held from 27 April to 4 May 2014, and was won by Adam Yates. British cyclist Mark Cavendish won four stages and the points classification.

== Schedule ==
Stage	Date	Course	Distance	Type	Winner	Ref
1	27 April	Alanya to Alanya	141.6 km (88.0 mi)	Flat stage	Mark Cavendish (GBR)	
2	28 April	Alanya to Kemer	174.6 km (108.5 mi)	Flat stage	Mark Cavendish (GBR)	
3	29 April	Finike to Elmalı	184.7 km (114.8 mi)	Mountain stage	Rein Taaramäe (EST)	
4	30 April	Fethiye to Marmaris	125 km (77.7 mi)	Hilly stage	Mark Cavendish (GBR)	
5	1 May	Marmaris to Bodrum (Turgutreis)	177.3 km (110.2 mi)	Hilly stage	Elia Viviani (ITA)	
6	2 May	Bodrum to Selçuk	183.1 km (113.8 mi)	Intermediate stage	Adam Yates (GBR)	
7	3 May	Kuşadası to İzmir	136.3 km (84.7 mi)	Flat stage	Elia Viviani (ITA)	
8	4 May	Istanbul to Istanbul	121 km (75.2 mi)	Flat stage	Mark Cavendish (GBR)	
Total		1,243.6 km (772.7 mi)				

== Teams ==
The start list includes 20 teams and 154 riders.

Pro Teams

- Astana
- Belkin Pro Cycling
- Cannondale
- Team Katusha
- Lampre–Merida
- Lotto–Belisol
- Omega Pharma–Quick-Step
- Orica–GreenEDGE

Professional Continental Teams

- Bardiani–CSF
- Caja Rural–Seguros RGA
- CCC–Polsat–Polkowice
- Cofidis
- Drapac Professional Cycling
- MTN–Qhubeka
- Neri Sottoli
- Team Novo Nordisk
- Topsport Vlaanderen–Baloise
- UnitedHealthcare
- Wanty–Groupe Gobert

Continental Teams

- Torku Şekerspor

== Stages ==
=== Stage 1 ===
27 April 2014 — Alanya to Alanya, 141.6 km (88.0 mi)

Stage 1 Result

	Rider	Team	Time
1	Mark Cavendish (GBR)	Omega Pharma–Quick-Step	3h 15' 43"
2	Elia Viviani (ITA)	Cannondale	s.t.
3	Theo Bos (NED)	Belkin Pro Cycling	s.t.
4	Niccolò Bonifazio (ITA)	Lampre–Merida	s.t.
5	Michael Van Staeyen (BEL)	Topsport Vlaanderen–Baloise	s.t.
6	Andrea Palini (ITA)	Lampre–Merida	s.t.
7	Danilo Napolitano (ITA)	Wanty–Groupe Gobert	s.t.
8	Jonas Vangenechten (BEL)	Lotto–Belisol	s.t.
9	Andrea Guardini (ITA)	Astana	s.t.
10	Kristian Sbaragli (ITA)	MTN–Qhubeka	s.t.

General classification after Stage 1

	Rider	Team	Time
1	Mark Cavendish (GBR)	Omega Pharma–Quick-Step	3h 15' 43"
2	Elia Viviani (ITA)	Cannondale	+ 0"
3	Theo Bos (NED)	Belkin Pro Cycling	+ 0"
4	Niccolò Bonifazio (ITA)	Lampre–Merida	+ 0"
5	Michael Van Staeyen (BEL)	Topsport Vlaanderen–Baloise	+ 0"
6	Andrea Palini (ITA)	Lampre–Merida	+ 0"
7	Danilo Napolitano (ITA)	Wanty–Groupe Gobert	+ 0"
8	Jonas Vangenechten (BEL)	Lotto–Belisol	+ 0"
9	Andrea Guardini (ITA)	Astana	+ 0"
10	Kristian Sbaragli (ITA)	MTN–Qhubeka	+ 0"

=== Stage 2 ===
28 April 2014 — Alanya to Kemer, 174.6 km (108.5 mi)

Stage 2 Result

	Rider	Team	Time
1	Mark Cavendish (GBR)	Omega Pharma–Quick-Step	3h 50' 17"
2	Francesco Chicchi (ITA)	Neri Sottoli	s.t.
3	Niccolò Bonifazio (ITA)	Lampre–Merida	s.t.
4	Kris Boeckmans (BEL)	Lotto–Belisol	s.t.
5	Francesco Lasca (ITA)	Caja Rural–Seguros RGA	s.t.
6	Ken Hanson (USA)	UnitedHealthcare	s.t.
7	Elia Viviani (ITA)	Cannondale	s.t.
8	Theo Bos (NED)	Belkin Pro Cycling	s.t.
9	Maximiliano Richeze (ARG)	Lampre–Merida	s.t.
10	Marco Canola (ITA)	Bardiani–CSF	s.t.

General classification after Stage 2

	Rider	Team	Time
1	Mark Cavendish (GBR)	Omega Pharma–Quick-Step	7h 06' 00"
2	Niccolò Bonifazio (ITA)	Lampre–Merida	+ 0"
3	Elia Viviani (ITA)	Cannondale	+ 0"
4	Theo Bos (NED)	Belkin Pro Cycling	+ 0"
5	Michael Van Staeyen (BEL)	Topsport Vlaanderen–Baloise	+ 0"
6	Ken Hanson (USA)	UnitedHealthcare	+ 0"
7	Wouter Wippert (NED)	Drapac Professional Cycling	+ 0"
8	Francesco Chicchi (ITA)	Neri Sottoli	+ 0"
9	Danilo Napolitano (ITA)	Wanty–Groupe Gobert	+ 0"
10	Francesco Lasca (ITA)	Caja Rural–Seguros RGA	+ 0"

=== Stage 3 ===
29 April 2014 — Finike to Elmalı, 184.7 km (114.8 mi)

Stage 3 Result

	Rider	Team	Time
1	Rein Taaramäe (EST)	Cofidis	5h 40' 31"
2	Adam Yates (GBR)	Orica–GreenEDGE	+ 6"
3	Romain Hardy (FRA)	Cofidis	+ 38"
4	Merhawi Kudus (ERI)	MTN–Qhubeka	+ 38"
5	Davide Rebellin (ITA)	CCC–Polsat–Polkowice	+ 38"
6	Luis León Sánchez (ESP)	Caja Rural–Seguros RGA	+ 38"
7	Adam Hansen (AUS)	Lotto–Belisol	+ 43"
8	Kristijan Đurasek (CRO)	Lampre–Merida	+ 44"
9	Juan José Cobo (ESP)	Torku Şekerspor	+ 44"
10	Enrico Barbin (ITA)	Bardiani–CSF	+ 44"

General classification after Stage 3

	Rider	Team	Time
1	Rein Taaramäe (EST)	Cofidis	12h 46' 31"
2	Adam Yates (GBR)	Orica–GreenEDGE	+ 6"
3	Romain Hardy (FRA)	Cofidis	+ 38"
4	Luis León Sánchez (ESP)	Caja Rural–Seguros RGA	+ 38"
5	Merhawi Kudus (ERI)	MTN–Qhubeka	+ 38"
6	Davide Rebellin (ITA)	CCC–Polsat–Polkowice	+ 38"
7	Adam Hansen (AUS)	Lotto–Belisol	+ 43"
8	Juan José Cobo (ESP)	Torku Şekerspor	+ 44"
9	Davide Formolo (ITA)	Cannondale	+ 44"
10	Enrico Barbin (ITA)	Bardiani–CSF	+ 44"

=== Stage 4 ===
30 April 2014 — Fethiye to Marmaris, 125 km (77.7 mi)

Stage 4 Result

	Rider	Team	Time
1	Mark Cavendish (GBR)	Omega Pharma–Quick-Step	3h 14' 23"
2	Maximiliano Richeze (ARG)	Lampre–Merida	s.t.
3	Mark Renshaw (AUS)	Omega Pharma–Quick-Step	s.t.
4	Kristian Sbaragli (ITA)	MTN–Qhubeka	s.t.
5	Elia Viviani (ITA)	Cannondale	s.t.
6	Jetse Bol (NED)	Belkin Pro Cycling	s.t.
7	Aldo Ino Ilešič (SLO)	UnitedHealthcare	s.t.
8	Marco Haller (AUT)	Team Katusha	s.t.
9	Ahmet Örken (TUR)	Torku Şekerspor	s.t.
10	Michael Van Staeyen (BEL)	Topsport Vlaanderen–Baloise	s.t.

General classification after Stage 4

	Rider	Team	Time
1	Rein Taaramäe (EST)	Cofidis	16h 00' 54"
2	Adam Yates (GBR)	Orica–GreenEDGE	+ 6"
3	Romain Hardy (FRA)	Cofidis	+ 38"
4	Luis León Sánchez (ESP)	Caja Rural–Seguros RGA	+ 38"
5	Merhawi Kudus (ERI)	MTN–Qhubeka	+ 38"
6	Adam Hansen (AUS)	Lotto–Belisol	+ 43"
7	Juan José Cobo (ESP)	Torku Şekerspor	+ 44"
8	Davide Formolo (ITA)	Cannondale	+ 44"
9	Enrico Barbin (ITA)	Bardiani–CSF	+ 44"
10	Alexsandr Dyachenko (KAZ)	Astana	+ 44"

=== Stage 5 ===
1 May 2014 — Marmaris to Bodrum–Turgutreis, 177.3 km (110.2 mi)

Stage 5 Result

	Rider	Team	Time
1	Elia Viviani (ITA)	Cannondale	4h 34' 11"
2	Mark Cavendish (GBR)	Omega Pharma–Quick-Step	s.t.
3	Kristian Sbaragli (ITA)	MTN–Qhubeka	s.t.
4	Andrea Fedi (ITA)	Neri Sottoli	s.t.
5	Danilo Napolitano (ITA)	Wanty–Groupe Gobert	s.t.
6	Rafael Andriato (BRA)	Neri Sottoli	s.t.
7	Barry Markus (NED)	Belkin Pro Cycling	s.t.
8	Niccolò Bonifazio (ITA)	Lampre–Merida	s.t.
9	Michael Van Staeyen (BEL)	Topsport Vlaanderen–Baloise	s.t.
10	Adam Phelan (AUS)	Drapac Professional Cycling	s.t.

General classification after Stage 5

	Rider	Team	Time
1	Rein Taaramäe (EST)	Cofidis	20h 35' 05"
2	Adam Yates (GBR)	Orica–GreenEDGE	+ 6"
3	Romain Hardy (FRA)	Cofidis	+ 38"
4	Merhawi Kudus (ERI)	MTN–Qhubeka	+ 38"
5	Luis León Sánchez (ESP)	Caja Rural–Seguros RGA	+ 38"
6	Adam Hansen (AUS)	Lotto–Belisol	+ 43"
7	Juan José Cobo (ESP)	Torku Şekerspor	+ 44"
8	Enrico Barbin (ITA)	Bardiani–CSF	+ 44"
9	Davide Formolo (ITA)	Cannondale	+ 44"
10	Alexsandr Dyachenko (KAZ)	Astana	+ 44"

=== Stage 6 ===
2 May 2014 — Bodrum to Selçuk, 183.1 km (113.8 mi)

Stage 6 Result

	Rider	Team	Time
1	Adam Yates (GBR)	Orica–GreenEDGE	4h 11' 46"
2	Davide Formolo (ITA)	Cannondale	+ 2"
3	Davide Rebellin (ITA)	CCC–Polsat–Polkowice	+ 2"
4	Rein Taaramäe (EST)	Cofidis	+ 7"
5	Kristijan Đurasek (CRO)	Lampre–Merida	+ 7"
6	Juan José Cobo (ESP)	Torku Şekerspor	+ 7"
7	Romain Hardy (FRA)	Cofidis	+ 7"
8	Luis León Sánchez (ESP)	Caja Rural–Seguros RGA	+ 15"
9	Adam Hansen (AUS)	Lotto–Belisol	+ 17"
10	Javier Mejías (ESP)	Team Novo Nordisk	+ 26"

General classification after Stage 6

	Rider	Team	Time
1	Adam Yates (GBR)	Orica–GreenEDGE	24h 46' 57"
2	Rein Taaramäe (EST)	Cofidis	+ 1"
3	Romain Hardy (FRA)	Cofidis	+ 39"
4	Davide Formolo (ITA)	Cannondale	+ 40"
5	Davide Rebellin (ITA)	CCC–Polsat–Polkowice	+ 44"
6	Juan José Cobo (ESP)	Torku Şekerspor	+ 45"
7	Kristijan Đurasek (CRO)	Lampre–Merida	+ 45"
8	Luis León Sánchez (ESP)	Caja Rural–Seguros RGA	+ 47"
9	Adam Hansen (AUS)	Lotto–Belisol	+ 54"
10	Enrico Barbin (ITA)	Bardiani–CSF	+ 1' 04"

=== Stage 7 ===
3 May 2014 — Kuşadası to İzmir, 136.3 km (84.7 mi)

Stage 7 Result

	Rider	Team	Time
1	Elia Viviani (ITA)	Cannondale	3h 04' 25"
2	Andrea Guardini (ITA)	Astana	s.t.
3	Mark Cavendish (GBR)	Omega Pharma–Quick-Step	s.t.
4	Kris Boeckmans (BEL)	Lotto–Belisol	s.t.
5	Theo Bos (NED)	Belkin Pro Cycling	s.t.
6	Kristian Sbaragli (ITA)	MTN–Qhubeka	s.t.
7	Ahmet Örken (TUR)	Torku Şekerspor	s.t.
8	Michael Van Staeyen (BEL)	Topsport Vlaanderen–Baloise	s.t.
9	Ken Hanson (USA)	UnitedHealthcare	s.t.
10	Wouter Wippert (NED)	Drapac Professional Cycling	s.t.

General classification after Stage 7

	Rider	Team	Time
1	Adam Yates (GBR)	Orica–GreenEDGE	27h 51' 22"
2	Rein Taaramäe (EST)	Cofidis	+ 1"
3	Romain Hardy (FRA)	Cofidis	+ 39"
4	Davide Formolo (ITA)	Cannondale	+ 40"
5	Davide Rebellin (ITA)	CCC–Polsat–Polkowice	+ 44"
6	Juan José Cobo (ESP)	Torku Şekerspor	+ 45"
7	Kristijan Đurasek (CRO)	Lampre–Merida	+ 45"
8	Luis León Sánchez (ESP)	Caja Rural–Seguros RGA	+ 47"
9	Adam Hansen (AUS)	Lotto–Belisol	+ 54"
10	Enrico Barbin (ITA)	Bardiani–CSF	+ 1' 04"

=== Stage 8 ===
4 May 2014 — Istanbul to Istanbul, 121 km (75.2 mi)

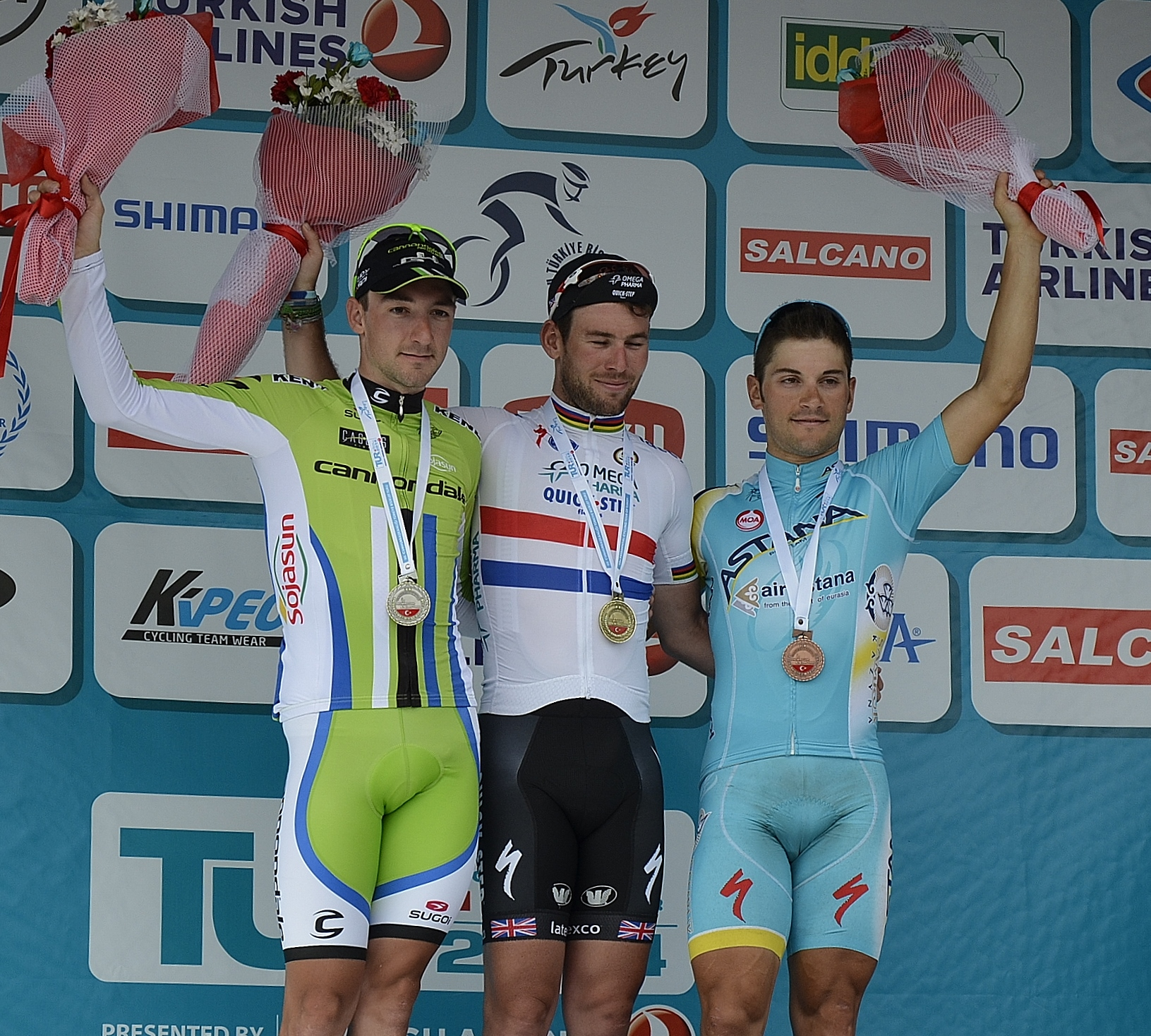
The stage podium (from left to right): Elia Viviani (2nd), Mark Cavendish (1st) and Andrea Guardini (3rd).

Stage 8 Result

	Rider	Team	Time
1	Mark Cavendish (GBR)	Omega Pharma–Quick-Step	2h 35' 00"
2	Elia Viviani (ITA)	Cannondale	s.t.
3	Andrea Guardini (ITA)	Astana	s.t.
4	Kris Boeckmans (BEL)	Lotto–Belisol	s.t.
5	Greg Henderson (NZL)	Lotto–Belisol	s.t.
6	Theo Bos (NED)	Belkin Pro Cycling	s.t.
7	Aldo Ino Ilešič (SLO)	UnitedHealthcare	s.t.
8	Michael Van Staeyen (BEL)	Topsport Vlaanderen–Baloise	s.t.
9	Kristian Sbaragli (ITA)	MTN–Qhubeka	s.t.
10	Ken Hanson (USA)	UnitedHealthcare	s.t.

Final General classification

	Rider	Team	Time
1	Adam Yates (GBR)	Orica–GreenEDGE	30h 26' 22"
2	Rein Taaramäe (EST)	Cofidis	+ 5"
3	Romain Hardy (FRA)	Cofidis	+ 39"
4	Davide Formolo (ITA)	Cannondale	+ 40"
5	Davide Rebellin (ITA)	CCC–Polsat–Polkowice	+ 44"
6	Juan José Cobo (ESP)	Torku Şekerspor	+ 45"
7	Kristijan Đurasek (CRO)	Lampre–Merida	+ 45"
8	Luis León Sánchez (ESP)	Caja Rural–Seguros RGA	+ 51"
9	Adam Hansen (AUS)	Lotto–Belisol	+ 58"
10	Enrico Barbin (ITA)	Bardiani–CSF	+ 1' 04"

== Classification leadership table ==
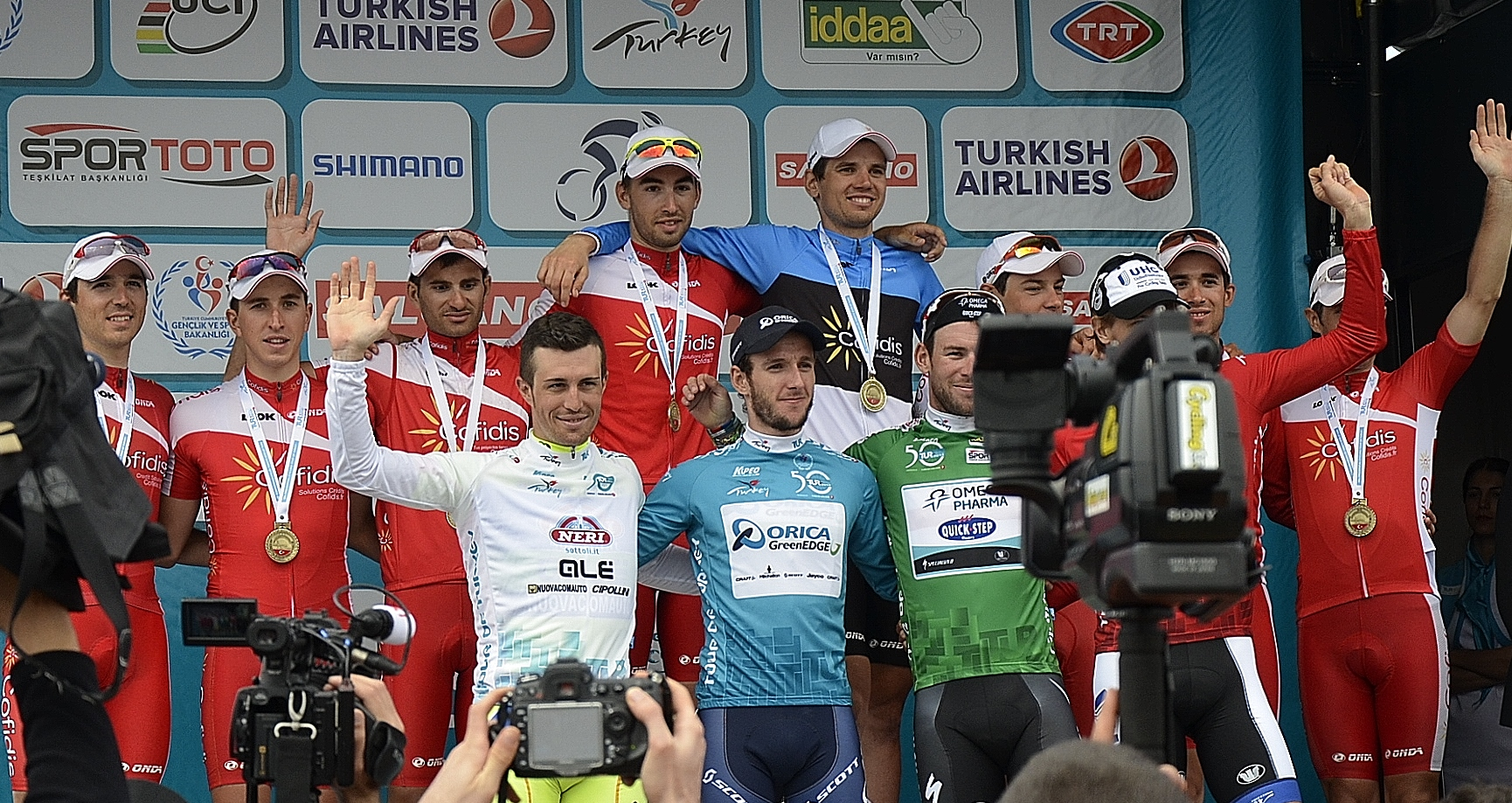
Overall winners on the podium: Cofidis (back row), Mattia Pozzo, Adam Yates, Mark Cavendish and Marc de Maar (front row, from left to right).

Stage	Winner	General classification	Points classification	Mountains classification	Turkish Beauties classification	Teams classification
1	Mark Cavendish	Mark Cavendish	Mark Cavendish	Marc de Maar	Fréderique Robert	Lampre–Merida
2	Mark Cavendish	Mark Cavendish	Mark Cavendish	Marc de Maar	Fréderique Robert	Lampre–Merida
3	Rein Taaramäe	Rein Taaramäe	Mark Cavendish	Rein Taaramäe	Mattia Pozzo	Cofidis
4	Mark Cavendish	Rein Taaramäe	Mark Cavendish	Rein Taaramäe	Mattia Pozzo	Cofidis
5	Elia Viviani	Rein Taaramäe	Mark Cavendish	Marc de Maar	Mattia Pozzo	Cofidis
6	Adam Yates	Adam Yates	Mark Cavendish	Marc de Maar	Mattia Pozzo	Cofidis
7	Elia Viviani	Adam Yates	Mark Cavendish	Marc de Maar	Mattia Pozzo	Cofidis
8	Mark Cavendish	Adam Yates	Mark Cavendish	Marc de Maar	Mattia Pozzo	Cofidis
Final		Adam Yates	Mark Cavendish	Marc de Maar	Mattia Pozzo	Cofidis
