= List of teams and cyclists in the 2020 Vuelta a España =

List of cyclists

The following is a list of teams and cyclists that took part in the 2020 Vuelta a España.

== Teams ==
The 19 UCI WorldTeams were automatically invited to the race. Additionally, the organisers of the Vuelta invited three second-tier UCI ProTeams to participate in the event.

The teams that participated in the race were:

UCI WorldTeams

- AG2R La Mondiale
- Astana
- Bahrain–McLaren
- Bora–Hansgrohe
- CCC Team
- Cofidis
- Deceuninck–Quick-Step
- EF Pro Cycling
- Groupama–FDJ
- Ineos Grenadiers
- Israel Start-Up Nation
- Lotto–Soudal
- Mitchelton–Scott
- Movistar Team
- NTT Pro Cycling
- Team Jumbo–Visma
- Team Sunweb
- Trek–Segafredo
- UAE Team Emirates

UCI ProTeams

- Burgos BH
- Caja Rural–Seguros RGA
- Total Direct Énergie

== Cyclists ==
Legend
No.	Starting number worn by the rider during the Vuelta
Pos.	Position in the general classification
Time	Deficit to the winner of the general classification
†	Denotes riders born on or after 1 January 1995 eligible for the young rider classification
	Denotes the winner of the general classification
	Denotes the winner of the points classification
	Denotes the winner of the mountains classification
	Denotes the winner of the young rider classification (eligibility indicated by †)
A white jersey with a red number bib.	Denotes the winner of the team classification
A white jersey with a yellow number bib.	Denotes the winner of the combativity award
DNS	Denotes a rider who did not start, followed by the stage before which he withdrew
DNF	Denotes a rider who did not finish, followed by the stage in which he withdrew
DSQ	Denotes a rider who was disqualified from the race, followed by the stage in which this occurred
HD	Denotes a rider finished outside the time limit, followed by the stage in which they did so
COV	Denotes a rider who withdrew because of COVID-19 either because he tested positive or team members tested positive, followed by the stage before which he withdrew
Ages correct as of Tuesday 20 October 2020, the date on which the Vuelta began

=== By starting number ===
No.	Name	Nationality	Team	Age	Pos.	Time	Ref.
1	Primož Roglič	Slovenia	Team Jumbo–Visma	30	1	72h 46' 12"	
2	George Bennett	New Zealand	Team Jumbo–Visma	30	12	+ 14' 04"	
3	Tom Dumoulin	Netherlands	Team Jumbo–Visma	29	DNS-8	–	
4	Robert Gesink	Netherlands	Team Jumbo–Visma	34	35	+ 1h 30' 31"	
5	Lennard Hofstede	Netherlands	Team Jumbo–Visma	25	51	+ 1h 59' 59"	
6	Sepp Kuss	United States	Team Jumbo–Visma	26	16	+ 16' 26"	
7	Paul Martens	Germany	Team Jumbo–Visma	36	109	+ 3h 48' 59"	
8	Jonas Vingegaard †	Denmark	Team Jumbo–Visma	23	46	+ 1h' 57' 00"	
11	Sam Bennett	Ireland	Deceuninck–Quick-Step	30	137	+ 4h 39' 06"	
12	Andrea Bagioli †	Italy	Deceuninck–Quick-Step	21	DNF-16	–	
13	Mattia Cattaneo	Italy	Deceuninck–Quick-Step	29	17	+ 17' 45"	
14	Ian Garrison †	United States	Deceuninck–Quick-Step	22	127	+ 4h 10' 26"	
15	Michael Mørkøv	Denmark	Deceuninck–Quick-Step	35	121	+ 4h 06' 02"	
16	Jannik Steimle †	Germany	Deceuninck–Quick-Step	24	83	+ 3h 18' 31"	
17	Zdeněk Štybar	Czech Republic	Deceuninck–Quick-Step	34	102	+ 3h 43' 05"	
18	Rémi Cavagna †	France	Deceuninck–Quick-Step	25	84	+ 3h 18' 33"	
21	David de la Cruz	Spain	UAE Team Emirates	31	7	+ 7' 35"	
22	Rui Costa	Portugal	UAE Team Emirates	34	44	+ 1h 54' 48"	
23	Davide Formolo	Italy	UAE Team Emirates	27	DNS-18	–	
24	Sergio Henao	Colombia	UAE Team Emirates	32	15	+ 15' 36"	
25	Jasper Philipsen †	Belgium	UAE Team Emirates	22	85	+ 3h 21' 10"	
26	Alexandr Riabushenko †	Belarus	UAE Team Emirates	25	90	+ 3h 26' 12"	
27	Ivo Oliveira †	Portugal	UAE Team Emirates	24	101	+ 3h 38' 14"	
28	Rui Oliveira †	Portugal	UAE Team Emirates	24	119	+ 4h 03' 39"	
31	Juan Pedro López †	Spain	Trek–Segafredo	23	42	+ 1h 51' 00"	
32	Matteo Moschetti †	Italy	Trek–Segafredo	24	HD-7	–	
33	Koen de Kort	Netherlands	Trek–Segafredo	38	82	+ 3h 18' 29"	
34	Niklas Eg †	Denmark	Trek–Segafredo	25	59	+ 2h 24' 36"	
35	Kenny Elissonde	France	Trek–Segafredo	29	DNS-8	–	
36	Alexander Kamp	Denmark	Trek–Segafredo	26	DNF-14	–	
37	Emīls Liepiņš	Latvia	Trek–Segafredo	27	124	+ 4h 07' 22"	
38	Michel Ries †	Luxembourg	Trek–Segafredo	22	60	+ 2h 25' 50"	
41	Robert Power †	Australia	Team Sunweb	25	37	+ 1h 33' 58"	
42	Thymen Arensman †	Netherlands	Team Sunweb	20	41	+ 1h 49' 10"	
43	Mark Donovan †	Great Britain	Team Sunweb	21	48	+ 1h 58' 52"	
44	Max Kanter †	Germany	Team Sunweb	22	112	+ 3h 53' 44"	
45	Martin Salmon †	Germany	Team Sunweb	22	DNF-14	–	
46	Michael Storer †	Australia	Team Sunweb	23	40	+ 1h 43' 56"	
47	Ilan Van Wilder †	Belgium	Team Sunweb	20	DNF-1	–	
48	Jasha Sütterlin	Germany	Team Sunweb	27	55	+ 2h 16' 38"	
51	Aleksandr Vlasov †	Russia	Astana	24	11	+ 9' 36"	
52	Alex Aranburu †	Spain	Astana	25	75	+ 2h 54' 43"	
53	Dmitriy Gruzdev	Kazakhstan	Astana	34	93	+ 3h 33' 29"	
54	Omar Fraile	Spain	Astana	30	64	+ 2h 33' 31"	
55	Ion Izagirre	Spain	Astana	31	29	+ 1h 12' 12"	
56	Merhawi Kudus	Eritrea	Astana	26	58	+ 2h 20' 11"	
57	Gorka Izagirre	Spain	Astana	33	19	+ 21' 46"	
58	Luis León Sánchez	Spain	Astana	36	DNS-16	–	
61	Pascal Ackermann	Germany	Bora–Hansgrohe	26	131	+ 4h 16' 49"	
62	Martin Laas	Estonia	Bora–Hansgrohe	27	140	+ 4h 55' 40"	
63	Felix Großschartner	Austria	Bora–Hansgrohe	26	9	+ 8' 15"	
64	Jay McCarthy	Australia	Bora–Hansgrohe	28	DNF-7	–	
65	Ide Schelling †	Netherlands	Bora–Hansgrohe	22	69	+ 2h 46' 53"	
66	Andreas Schillinger	Germany	Bora–Hansgrohe	37	123	+ 4h 06' 15"	
67	Michael Schwarzmann	Germany	Bora–Hansgrohe	29	122	+ 4h 06' 11"	
68	Rüdiger Selig	Germany	Bora–Hansgrohe	31	141	+ 5h 00' 37"	
71	Chris Froome	Great Britain	Ineos Grenadiers	35	98	+ 3h 32' 14"	
72	Richard Carapaz	Ecuador	Ineos Grenadiers	27	2	+ 24"	
73	Andrey Amador	Costa Rica	Ineos Grenadiers	34	52	+ 2h 10' 34"	
74	Michał Gołaś	Poland	Ineos Grenadiers	36	DNS-8	–	
75	Brandon Rivera †	Colombia	Ineos Grenadiers	24	DNF-2	–	
76	Iván Sosa †	Colombia	Ineos Grenadiers	22	62	+ 2h 30' 01"	
77	Dylan van Baarle	Netherlands	Ineos Grenadiers	28	49	+ 1h 59' 36"	
78	Cameron Wurf	Australia	Ineos Grenadiers	37	95	+ 3h 31' 14"	
81	Esteban Chaves	Colombia	Mitchelton–Scott	30	27	+ 1h 09' 51"	
82	Tsgabu Grmay	Ethiopia	Mitchelton–Scott	29	54	+ 2h 15' 16"	
83	Mikel Nieve	Spain	Mitchelton–Scott	36	13	+ 14' 47"	
84	Nick Schultz	Australia	Mitchelton–Scott	26	25	+ 1h 03' 46"	
85	Callum Scotson †	Australia	Mitchelton–Scott	24	88	+ 3h 24' 18"	
86	Dion Smith	New Zealand	Mitchelton–Scott	27	74	+ 2h 54' 19"	
87	Robert Stannard †	Australia	Mitchelton–Scott	22	76	+ 2h 56' 02"	
88	Alex Edmondson	Australia	Mitchelton–Scott	26	135	+ 4h 23' 51"	
91	Thibaut Pinot	France	Groupama–FDJ	30	DNS-3	–	
92	Bruno Armirail	France	Groupama–FDJ	26	28	+ 1h 10' 22"	
93	Mickaël Delage	France	Groupama–FDJ	35	142	+ 5h 04' 17"	
94	David Gaudu †	France	Groupama–FDJ	24	8	+ 7' 45"	
95	Matthieu Ladagnous	France	Groupama–FDJ	35	DNF-11	–	
96	Olivier Le Gac	France	Groupama–FDJ	27	68	+ 2h 41' 22"	
97	Anthony Roux	France	Groupama–FDJ	33	66	+ 2h 36' 06"	
98	Romain Seigle	France	Groupama–FDJ	26	DNF-7	–	
101	Daniel Martínez †	Colombia	EF Pro Cycling	24	DNS-4	–	
102	Hugh Carthy	Great Britain	EF Pro Cycling	26	3	+ 1' 15"	
103	Mitchell Docker	Australia	EF Pro Cycling	34	132	+ 4h 17' 56"	
104	Magnus Cort	Denmark	EF Pro Cycling	27	67	+ 2h 38' 21"	
105	Logan Owen †	United States	EF Pro Cycling	25	105	+ 3h 45' 14"	
106	Julius van den Berg †	Netherlands	EF Pro Cycling	23	126	+ 4h 09' 53"	
107	Tejay van Garderen	United States	EF Pro Cycling	32	113	+ 3h 56' 19"	
108	Michael Woods	Canada	EF Pro Cycling	34	34	+ 1h 29' 26"	
111	Wout Poels	Netherlands	Bahrain–McLaren	33	6	+ 7' 16"	
112	Grega Bole	Slovenia	Bahrain–McLaren	35	DNF-5	–	
113	Santiago Buitrago †	Colombia	Bahrain–McLaren	21	53	+ 2h 14' 34"	
114	Scott Davies †	Great Britain	Bahrain–McLaren	25	111	+ 3h 52' 18"	
115	Kevin Inkelaar †	Netherlands	Bahrain–McLaren	23	138	+ 4h 39' 48"	
116	Matej Mohorič	Slovenia	Bahrain–McLaren	26	DNS-3	–	
117	Alfred Wright †	Great Britain	Bahrain–McLaren	21	91	+ 3h 27' 20"	
118	Stephen Williams †	Great Britain	Bahrain–McLaren	24	DNS-11	–	
121	Clément Champoussin †	France	AG2R La Mondiale	22	31	+ 1h 21' 20"	
122	Mathias Frank	Switzerland	AG2R La Mondiale	33	DNF-1	–	
123	Alexandre Geniez	France	AG2R La Mondiale	32	DNF-1	–	
124	Dorian Godon †	France	AG2R La Mondiale	24	38	+ 1h 42' 00"	
125	Nans Peters	France	AG2R La Mondiale	26	36	+ 1h 30' 35"	
126	Harry Tanfield	Great Britain	AG2R La Mondiale	25	DNF-15	–	
127	Quentin Jaurégui	France	AG2R La Mondiale	26	DNF-11	–	
128	Axel Domont	France	AG2R La Mondiale	30	DNF-2	–	
131	Simon Geschke	Germany	CCC Team	34	DNS-4	–	
132	Will Barta †	United States	CCC Team	24	22	+ 50' 04"	
133	Jan Hirt	Czech Republic	CCC Team	29	56	+ 2h 20' 00"	
134	Jakub Mareczko	Italy	CCC Team	26	DNF-11	–	
135	Michał Paluta †	Poland	CCC Team	25	118	+ 4h 02' 49"	
136	Łukasz Wiśniowski	Poland	CCC Team	28	115	+ 3h 57' 14"	
137	Georg Zimmermann †	Germany	CCC Team	23	21	+ 45' 40"	
138	Francisco Ventoso	Spain	CCC Team	38	DNF-5	–	
141	Tim Wellens	Belgium	Lotto–Soudal	29	78	+ 3h 05' 52"	
142	Gerben Thijssen †	Belgium	Lotto–Soudal	22	DNF-15	–	
143	Stan Dewulf †	Belgium	Lotto–Soudal	22	70	+ 2h 48' 18"	
144	Kobe Goossens †	Belgium	Lotto–Soudal	24	24	+ 1h 02' 57"	
145	Tomasz Marczyński	Poland	Lotto–Soudal	36	108	+ 3h 48' 30"	
146	Rémy Mertz †	Belgium	Lotto–Soudal	25	104	+ 3h 44' 39"	
147	Tosh Van der Sande	Belgium	Lotto–Soudal	29	96	+ 3h 31' 47"	
148	Brent Van Moer †	Belgium	Lotto–Soudal	22	100	+ 3h 33' 40"	
151	Guillaume Martin	France	Cofidis	27	14	+ 15' 07"	
152	Fernando Barceló †	Spain	Cofidis	24	DNS-6	–	
153	Natnael Berhane	Eritrea	Cofidis	29	DNF-5	–	
154	José Herrada	Spain	Cofidis	35	26	+ 1h 05' 17"	
155	Victor Lafay †	France	Cofidis	24	81	+ 3h 18' 11"	
156	Luis Ángel Maté	Spain	Cofidis	36	23	+ 55' 06"	
157	Emmanuel Morin †	France	Cofidis	25	134	+ 4h 20' 39"	
158	Pierre-Luc Périchon	France	Cofidis	33	97	+ 3h 32' 01"	
161	Carlos Barbero	Spain	NTT Pro Cycling	29	107	+ 3h 46' 40"	
162	Stefan De Bod †	South Africa	NTT Pro Cycling	23	94	+ 3h 30' 49"	
163	Nic Dlamini †	South Africa	NTT Pro Cycling	25	DNF-11	–	
164	Benjamin Dyball	Australia	NTT Pro Cycling	31	130	+ 4h 16' 20"	
165	Enrico Gasparotto	Switzerland	NTT Pro Cycling	38	120	+ 4h 05' 45"	
166	Michael Valgren	Denmark	NTT Pro Cycling	28	33	+ 1h 29' 17"	
167	Reinardt Janse van Rensburg	South Africa	NTT Pro Cycling	31	103	+ 3h 43' 49"	
168	Gino Mäder †	Switzerland	NTT Pro Cycling	23	20	+ 43' 39"	
171	Alejandro Valverde	Spain	Movistar Team	40	10	+ 9' 34"	
172	Jorge Arcas	Spain	Movistar Team	28	77	+ 2h 58' 22"	
173	Imanol Erviti	Spain	Movistar Team	36	47	+ 1h 57' 22"	
174	Enric Mas †	Spain	Movistar Team	25	5	+ 3' 36"	
175	Nelson Oliveira	Portugal	Movistar Team	31	39	+ 1h 42' 02"	
176	José Joaquín Rojas	Spain	Movistar Team	35	32	+ 1h 22' 36"	
177	Marc Soler	Spain	Movistar Team	26	18	+ 21' 01"	
178	Carlos Verona	Spain	Movistar Team	27	30	+ 1h 13' 22"	
181	Dan Martin	Ireland	Israel Start-Up Nation	34	4	+ 2' 43"	
182	Omer Goldstein †	Israel	Israel Start-Up Nation	24	106	+ 3h 45' 59"	
183	Reto Hollenstein	Switzerland	Israel Start-Up Nation	35	72	+ 2h 51' 56"	
184	James Piccoli	Canada	Israel Start-Up Nation	29	125	+ 4h 08' 40"	
185	Mihkel Räim	Estonia	Israel Start-Up Nation	27	139	+ 4h 46' 31"	
186	Alexis Renard †	France	Israel Start-Up Nation	21	DNF-14	–	
187	Rory Sutherland	Australia	Israel Start-Up Nation	38	129	+ 4h 14' 17"	
188	Matteo Badilatti	Switzerland	Israel Start-Up Nation	28	110	+ 3h 49' 49"	
191	Niki Terpstra	Netherlands	Total Direct Énergie	36	136	+ 4h 36' 59"	
192	Lorrenzo Manzin	France	Total Direct Énergie	26	133	+ 4h 19' 58"	
193	Valentin Ferron †	France	Total Direct Énergie	22	87	+ 3h 24' 10"	
194	Jonathan Hivert	France	Total Direct Énergie	35	86	+ 3h 22' 59"	
195	Pim Ligthart	Netherlands	Total Direct Énergie	32	DNF-15	–	
196	Paul Ourselin	France	Total Direct Énergie	26	79	+ 3h 06' 13"	
197	Romain Sicard	France	Total Direct Énergie	32	45	+ 1h 55' 44"	
198	Julien Simon	France	Total Direct Énergie	35	65	+ 2h 35' 29"	
201	Jonathan Lastra	Spain	Caja Rural–Seguros RGA	27	61	+ 2h 29' 21"	
202	Jon Aberasturi	Spain	Caja Rural–Seguros RGA	31	117	+ 3h 59' 53"	
203	Julen Amezqueta	Spain	Caja Rural–Seguros RGA	27	50	+ 1h 59' 58"	
204	Aritz Bagües	Spain	Caja Rural–Seguros RGA	31	92	+ 3h 29' 48"	
205	Jefferson Cepeda †	Ecuador	Caja Rural–Seguros RGA	24	116	+ 3h 57' 46"	
206	Jhojan García †	Colombia	Caja Rural–Seguros RGA	22	71	+ 2h 48' 52"	
207	Héctor Sáez	Spain	Caja Rural–Seguros RGA	26	DNF-11	–	
208	Gonzalo Serrano	Spain	Caja Rural–Seguros RGA	26	57	+ 2h 20' 05"	
211	Ángel Madrazo	Spain	Burgos BH	32	43	+ 1h 54' 24"	
212	Jetse Bol	Netherlands	Burgos BH	31	80	+ 3h 13' 59"	
213	Óscar Cabedo	Spain	Burgos BH	25	63	+ 2h 30' 26"	
214	Jesús Ezquerra	Spain	Burgos BH	29	89	+ 3h 25' 04"	
215	Alex Molenaar †	Netherlands	Burgos BH	21	128	+ 4h 12' 35"	
216	Juan Felipe Osorio †	Colombia	Burgos BH	25	114	+ 3h 56' 27"	
217	Willie Smit	South Africa	Burgos BH	27	73	+ 2h 52' 11"	
218	Ricardo Vilela	Portugal	Burgos BH	32	99	+ 3h 32' 34"	

=== By team ===
Team Jumbo–Visma (TJV)
No.	Rider	Pos.
1	Primož Roglič (SLO)	1
2	George Bennett (NZL)	12
3	Tom Dumoulin (NED)	DNS-8
4	Robert Gesink (NED)	35
5	Lennard Hofstede (NED)	51
6	Sepp Kuss (USA)	16
7	Paul Martens (GER)	109
8	Jonas Vingegaard (DEN)	46

Deceuninck–Quick-Step (DQT)
No.	Rider	Pos.
11	Sam Bennett (IRL)	137
12	Andrea Bagioli (ITA)	DNF-16
13	Mattia Cattaneo (ITA)	17
14	Ian Garrison (USA)	127
15	Michael Mørkøv (DEN)	121
16	Jannik Steimle (GER)	83
17	Zdeněk Štybar (CZE)	102
18	Rémi Cavagna (FRA)	84

UAE Team Emirates (UAD)
No.	Rider	Pos.
21	David de la Cruz (ESP)	7
22	Rui Costa (POR)	44
23	Davide Formolo (ITA)	DNS-18
24	Sergio Henao (COL)	15
25	Jasper Philipsen (BEL)	85
26	Alexandr Riabushenko (BLR)	90
27	Ivo Oliveira (POR)	101
28	Rui Oliveira (POR)	119

Trek–Segafredo (TFS)
No.	Rider	Pos.
31	Juan Pedro López (ESP)	42
32	Matteo Moschetti (ITA)	HD-7
33	Koen de Kort (NED)	82
34	Niklas Eg (DEN)	59
35	Kenny Elissonde (FRA)	DNS-8
36	Alexander Kamp (DEN)	DNF-14
37	Emīls Liepiņš (LAT)	124
38	Michel Ries (LUX)	60

Team Sunweb (SUN)
No.	Rider	Pos.
41	Robert Power (AUS)	37
42	Thymen Arensman (NED)	41
43	Mark Donovan (GBR)	48
44	Max Kanter (GER)	112
45	Martin Salmon (GER)	DNF-14
46	Michael Storer (AUS)	40
47	Ilan Van Wilder (BEL)	DNF-1
48	Jasha Sütterlin (GER)	55

Astana (AST)
No.	Rider	Pos.
51	Aleksandr Vlasov (RUS)	11
52	Alex Aranburu (ESP)	75
53	Dmitriy Gruzdev (KAZ)	93
54	Omar Fraile (ESP)	64
55	Ion Izagirre (ESP)	29
56	Merhawi Kudus (ERI)	58
57	Gorka Izagirre (ESP)	19
58	Luis León Sánchez (ESP)	DNS-16

Bora–Hansgrohe (BOH)
No.	Rider	Pos.
61	Pascal Ackermann (GER)	131
62	Martin Laas (EST)	140
63	Felix Großschartner (AUT)	9
64	Jay McCarthy (AUS)	DNF-7
65	Ide Schelling (NED)	69
66	Andreas Schillinger (GER)	123
67	Michael Schwarzmann (GER)	122
68	Rüdiger Selig (GER)	141

Ineos Grenadiers (IGD)
No.	Rider	Pos.
71	Chris Froome (GBR)	98
72	Richard Carapaz (ECU)	2
73	Andrey Amador (CRC)	52
74	Michał Gołaś (POL)	DNS-8
75	Brandon Rivera (COL)	DNF-2
76	Iván Sosa (COL)	62
77	Dylan van Baarle (NED)	49
78	Cameron Wurf (AUS)	95

Mitchelton–Scott (MTS)
No.	Rider	Pos.
81	Esteban Chaves (COL)	27
82	Tsgabu Grmay (ETH)	54
83	Mikel Nieve (ESP)	13
84	Nick Schultz (AUS)	25
85	Callum Scotson (AUS)	88
86	Dion Smith (NZL)	74
87	Robert Stannard (AUS)	76
88	Alex Edmondson (AUS)	135

Groupama–FDJ (GFC)
No.	Rider	Pos.
91	Thibaut Pinot (FRA)	DNS-3
92	Bruno Armirail (FRA)	28
93	Mickaël Delage (FRA)	142
94	David Gaudu (FRA)	8
95	Matthieu Ladagnous (FRA)	DNF-11
96	Olivier Le Gac (FRA)	68
97	Anthony Roux (FRA)	66
98	Romain Seigle (FRA)	DNF-7

EF Pro Cycling (EF1)
No.	Rider	Pos.
101	Daniel Martínez (COL)	DNS-4
102	Hugh Carthy (GBR)	3
103	Mitchell Docker (AUS)	132
104	Magnus Cort (DEN)	67
105	Logan Owen (USA)	105
106	Julius van den Berg (NED)	126
107	Tejay van Garderen (USA)	113
108	Michael Woods (CAN)	34

Bahrain–McLaren (TBM)
No.	Rider	Pos.
111	Wout Poels (NED)	6
112	Grega Bole (SLO)	DNF-5
113	Santiago Buitrago (COL)	53
114	Scott Davies (GBR)	111
115	Kevin Inkelaar (NED)	138
116	Matej Mohorič (SLO)	DNS-3
117	Alfred Wright (GBR)	91
118	Stephen Williams (GBR)	DNS-11

AG2R La Mondiale (ALM)
No.	Rider	Pos.
121	Clément Champoussin (FRA)	31
122	Mathias Frank (SUI)	DNF-1
123	Alexandre Geniez (FRA)	DNF-1
124	Dorian Godon (FRA)	38
125	Nans Peters (FRA)	36
126	Harry Tanfield (GBR)	DNF-15
127	Quentin Jaurégui (FRA)	DNF-11
128	Axel Domont (FRA)	DNF-2

CCC Team (CCC)
No.	Rider	Pos.
131	Simon Geschke (GER)	DNS-4
132	Will Barta (USA)	22
133	Jan Hirt (CZE)	56
134	Jakub Mareczko (ITA)	DNF-11
135	Michał Paluta (POL)	118
136	Łukasz Wiśniowski (POL)	115
137	Georg Zimmermann (GER)	21
138	Francisco Ventoso (ESP)	DNF-5

Lotto–Soudal (LTS)
No.	Rider	Pos.
141	Tim Wellens (BEL)	78
142	Gerben Thijssen (BEL)	DNF-15
143	Stan Dewulf (BEL)	70
144	Kobe Goossens (BEL)	24
145	Tomasz Marczyński (POL)	108
146	Rémy Mertz (BEL)	104
147	Tosh Van der Sande (BEL)	96
148	Brent Van Moer (BEL)	100

Cofidis (COF)
No.	Rider	Pos.
151	Guillaume Martin (FRA)	14
152	Fernando Barceló (ESP)	DNS-6
153	Natnael Berhane (ERI)	DNF-5
154	José Herrada (ESP)	26
155	Victor Lafay (FRA)	81
156	Luis Ángel Maté (ESP)	23
157	Emmanuel Morin (FRA)	134
158	Pierre-Luc Périchon (FRA)	97

NTT Pro Cycling (NTT)
No.	Rider	Pos.
161	Carlos Barbero (ESP)	107
162	Stefan De Bod (RSA)	94
163	Nic Dlamini (RSA)	DNF-11
164	Benjamin Dyball (AUS)	130
165	Enrico Gasparotto (SUI)	120
166	Michael Valgren (DEN)	33
167	Reinardt Janse van Rensburg (RSA)	103
168	Gino Mäder (SUI)	20

Movistar Team (MOV)
No.	Rider	Pos.
171	Alejandro Valverde (ESP)	10
172	Jorge Arcas (ESP)	77
173	Imanol Erviti (ESP)	47
174	Enric Mas (ESP)	5
175	Nelson Oliveira (POR)	39
176	José Joaquín Rojas (ESP)	32
177	Marc Soler (ESP)	18
178	Carlos Verona (ESP)	30

Israel Start-Up Nation (ISN)
No.	Rider	Pos.
181	Dan Martin (IRL)	4
182	Omer Goldstein (ISR)	106
183	Reto Hollenstein (SUI)	72
184	James Piccoli (CAN)	125
185	Mihkel Räim (EST)	139
186	Alexis Renard (FRA)	DNF-14
187	Rory Sutherland (AUS)	129
188	Matteo Badilatti (SUI)	110

Total Direct Énergie (TDE)
No.	Rider	Pos.
191	Niki Terpstra (NED)	136
192	Lorrenzo Manzin (FRA)	133
193	Valentin Ferron (FRA)	87
194	Jonathan Hivert (FRA)	86
195	Pim Ligthart (NED)	DNF-15
196	Paul Ourselin (FRA)	79
197	Romain Sicard (FRA)	45
198	Julien Simon (FRA)	65

Caja Rural–Seguros RGA (CJR)
No.	Rider	Pos.
201	Jonathan Lastra (ESP)	61
202	Jon Aberasturi (ESP)	117
203	Julen Amezqueta (ESP)	50
204	Aritz Bagües (ESP)	92
205	Jefferson Cepeda (ECU)	116
206	Jhojan García (COL)	71
207	Héctor Sáez (ESP)	DNF-11
208	Gonzalo Serrano (ESP)	57

Burgos BH (BBH)
No.	Rider	Pos.
211	Ángel Madrazo (ESP)	43
212	Jetse Bol (NED)	80
213	Óscar Cabedo (ESP)	63
214	Jesús Ezquerra (ESP)	89
215	Alex Molenaar (NED)	128
216	Juan Felipe Osorio (COL)	114
217	Willie Smit (RSA)	73
218	Ricardo Vilela (POR)	99

=== By nationality ===
Country	No. of riders	Finishers	Stage wins
Australia	11	10	
Austria	1	1	
Belarus	1	1	
Belgium	9	7	3 (Jasper Philipsen, Tim Wellens x2)
Canada	2	2	1 (Michael Woods)
Colombia	8	6	
Costa Rica	1	1	
Czechia	2	2	
Denmark	6	5	1 (Magnus Cort)
Ecuador	2	2	
Eritrea	2	1	
Estonia	2	2	
Ethiopia	1	1	
France	27	19	2 (David Gaudu x2)
Germany	11	9	2 (Pascal Ackermann x2)
Great Britain	7	5	1 (Hugh Carthy)
Ireland	2	2	2 (Sam Bennett, Dan Martin)
Israel	1	1	
Italy	5	1	
Kazakhstan	1	1	
Latvia	1	1	
Luxembourg	1	1	
Netherlands	14	12	
New Zealand	2	2	
Poland	4	3	
Portugal	5	5	
Russia	1	1	
Slovenia	3	1	4 (Primož Roglič x4)
South Africa	4	3	
Spain	29	25	2 (Ion Izagirre, Marc Soler)
Switzerland	5	4	
United States	5	5	
Total	176	142	18
