= 2020 Vuelta a España, Stage 1 to Stage 9 =

Cycling race stages

The 2020 Vuelta a España is the 75th edition of the Vuelta a España, one of cycling's Grand Tours. The Vuelta began in Irun with a hilly stage on 20 October, and Stage 9 occurred on 29 October with a stage to Aguilar de Campoo. The race finished in Madrid on 8 November.

== Classification standings ==
Legend
A red jersey.	Denotes the leader of the general classification	A white jersey.	Denotes the leader of the young rider classification
A green jersey.	Denotes the leader of the points classification	A white jersey with a red number bib.	Denotes the leader of the team classification
A blue polka dot jersey.	Denotes the leader of the mountains classification	A white jersey with a yellow number bib.	Denotes the winner of the combativity award

== Stage 1 ==
20 October 2020 – Irun to Arrate, 173 km (107 mi)

Stage 1 Result
Rank	Rider	Team	Time
1	Primož Roglič (SLO)	Team Jumbo–Visma	4h 22' 34"
2	Richard Carapaz (ECU)	INEOS Grenadiers	+ 1"
3	Dan Martin (IRL)	Israel Start-Up Nation	+ 1"
4	Esteban Chaves (COL)	Mitchelton–Scott	+ 1"
5	Felix Großschartner (AUT)	Bora–Hansgrohe	+ 1"
6	Enric Mas (ESP)	Movistar Team	+ 1"
7	Hugh Carthy (GBR)	EF Pro Cycling	+ 4"
8	Sepp Kuss (USA)	Team Jumbo–Visma	+ 10"
9	George Bennett (NZL)	Team Jumbo–Visma	+ 40"
10	Andrea Bagioli (ITA)	Deceuninck–Quick-Step	+ 51"

General classification after Stage 1
Rank	Rider	Team	Time
1	Primož Roglič (SLO)	Team Jumbo–Visma	4h 22' 24"
2	Richard Carapaz (ECU)	INEOS Grenadiers	+ 5"
3	Dan Martin (IRL)	Israel Start-Up Nation	+ 7"
4	Esteban Chaves (COL)	Mitchelton–Scott	+ 11"
5	Felix Großschartner (AUT)	Bora–Hansgrohe	+ 11"
6	Enric Mas (ESP)	Movistar Team	+ 11"
7	Hugh Carthy (GBR)	EF Pro Cycling	+ 14"
8	Sepp Kuss (USA)	Team Jumbo–Visma	+ 20"
9	George Bennett (NZL)	Team Jumbo–Visma	+ 50"
10	Andrea Bagioli (ITA)	Deceuninck–Quick-Step	+ 1' 01"

== Stage 2 ==
21 October 2020 – Pamplona to Lekunberri, 151.6 km (94.2 mi)

Stage 2 Result
Rank	Rider	Team	Time
1	Marc Soler (ESP)	Movistar Team	3h 47' 04"
2	Primož Roglič (SLO)	Team Jumbo–Visma	+ 19"
3	Dan Martin (IRL)	Israel Start-Up Nation	+ 19"
4	Richard Carapaz (ECU)	INEOS Grenadiers	+ 19"
5	Alejandro Valverde (ESP)	Movistar Team	+ 19"
6	Enric Mas (ESP)	Movistar Team	+ 19"
7	Esteban Chaves (COL)	Mitchelton–Scott	+ 19"
8	Hugh Carthy (GBR)	EF Pro Cycling	+ 19"
9	Sepp Kuss (USA)	Team Jumbo–Visma	+ 19"
10	George Bennett (NZL)	Team Jumbo–Visma	+ 19"

General classification after Stage 2
Rank	Rider	Team	Time
1	Primož Roglič (SLO)	Team Jumbo–Visma	8h 09' 41"
2	Dan Martin (IRL)	Israel Start-Up Nation	+ 9"
3	Richard Carapaz (ECU)	INEOS Grenadiers	+ 11"
4	Esteban Chaves (COL)	Mitchelton–Scott	+ 17"
5	Enric Mas (ESP)	Movistar Team	+ 17"
6	Hugh Carthy (GBR)	EF Pro Cycling	+ 20"
7	Sepp Kuss (USA)	Team Jumbo–Visma	+ 26"
8	George Bennett (NZL)	Team Jumbo–Visma	+ 56"
9	Felix Großschartner (AUT)	Bora–Hansgrohe	+ 59"
10	Marc Soler (ESP)	Movistar Team	+ 1' 04"

== Stage 3 ==
22 October 2020 – Lodosa to Laguna Negra de Urbión (Vinuesa), 166.1 km (103.2 mi)

Stage 3 Result
Rank	Rider	Team	Time
1	Dan Martin (IRL)	Israel Start-Up Nation	4h 27' 49"
2	Primož Roglič (SLO)	Team Jumbo–Visma	+ 0"
3	Richard Carapaz (ECU)	INEOS Grenadiers	+ 0"
4	Wout Poels (NED)	Bahrain–McLaren	+ 4"
5	Aleksandr Vlasov (RUS)	Astana	+ 7"
6	Enric Mas (ESP)	Movistar Team	+ 9"
7	Felix Großschartner (AUT)	Bora–Hansgrohe	+ 12"
8	Hugh Carthy (GBR)	EF Pro Cycling	+ 12"
9	Sepp Kuss (USA)	Team Jumbo–Visma	+ 12"
10	Clément Champoussin (FRA)	AG2R La Mondiale	+ 24"

General classification after Stage 3
Rank	Rider	Team	Time
1	Primož Roglič (SLO)	Team Jumbo–Visma	12h 37' 24"
2	Dan Martin (IRL)	Israel Start-Up Nation	+ 5"
3	Richard Carapaz (ECU)	INEOS Grenadiers	+ 13"
4	Enric Mas (ESP)	Movistar Team	+ 32"
5	Hugh Carthy (GBR)	EF Pro Cycling	+ 38"
6	Sepp Kuss (USA)	Team Jumbo–Visma	+ 44"
7	Felix Großschartner (AUT)	Bora–Hansgrohe	+ 1' 17"
8	Esteban Chaves (COL)	Mitchelton–Scott	+ 1' 29"
9	Marc Soler (ESP)	Movistar Team	+ 1' 55"
10	George Bennett (NZL)	Team Jumbo–Visma	+ 1' 57"

== Stage 4 ==
23 October 2020 – Garray to Ejea de los Caballeros, 191.7 km (119.1 mi)

Stage 4 Result
Rank	Rider	Team	Time
1	Sam Bennett (IRL)	Deceuninck–Quick-Step	3h 53' 29"
2	Jasper Philipsen (BEL)	UAE Team Emirates	+ 0"
3	Jakub Mareczko (ITA)	CCC Team	+ 0"
4	Pascal Ackermann (GER)	Bora–Hansgrohe	+ 0"
5	Gerben Thijssen (BEL)	Lotto–Soudal	+ 0"
6	Matteo Moschetti (ITA)	Trek–Segafredo	+ 0"
7	Max Kanter (GER)	Team Sunweb	+ 0"
8	Mihkel Räim (EST)	Israel Start-Up Nation	+ 0"
9	Emmanuel Morin (FRA)	Cofidis	+ 0"
10	Magnus Cort (DEN)	EF Pro Cycling	+ 0"

General classification after Stage 4
Rank	Rider	Team	Time
1	Primož Roglič (SLO)	Team Jumbo–Visma	16h 30' 53"
2	Dan Martin (IRL)	Israel Start-Up Nation	+ 5"
3	Richard Carapaz (ECU)	INEOS Grenadiers	+ 13"
4	Enric Mas (ESP)	Movistar Team	+ 32"
5	Hugh Carthy (GBR)	EF Pro Cycling	+ 38"
6	Sepp Kuss (USA)	Team Jumbo–Visma	+ 44"
7	Felix Großschartner (AUT)	Bora–Hansgrohe	+ 1' 17"
8	Esteban Chaves (COL)	Mitchelton–Scott	+ 1' 29"
9	Marc Soler (ESP)	Movistar Team	+ 1' 55"
10	George Bennett (NZL)	Team Jumbo–Visma	+ 1' 57"

== Stage 5 ==
24 October 2020 – Huesca to Sabiñánigo, 184.4 km (114.6 mi)

Stage 5 Result
Rank	Rider	Team	Time
1	Tim Wellens (BEL)	Lotto–Soudal	4h 19' 25"
2	Guillaume Martin (FRA)	Cofidis	+ 4"
3	Thymen Arensman (NED)	Team Sunweb	+ 12"
4	Primož Roglič (SLO)	Team Jumbo–Visma	+ 2' 13"
5	Felix Großschartner (AUT)	Bora–Hansgrohe	+ 2' 13"
6	Alex Aranburu (ESP)	Astana	+ 2' 13"
7	George Bennett (NZL)	Team Jumbo–Visma	+ 2' 13"
8	Julien Simon (FRA)	Total Direct Énergie	+ 2' 13"
9	Richard Carapaz (ECU)	INEOS Grenadiers	+ 2' 13"
10	Dorian Godon (FRA)	AG2R La Mondiale	+ 2' 13"

General classification after Stage 5
Rank	Rider	Team	Time
1	Primož Roglič (SLO)	Team Jumbo–Visma	20h 52' 31"
2	Dan Martin (IRL)	Israel Start-Up Nation	+ 5"
3	Richard Carapaz (ECU)	INEOS Grenadiers	+ 13"
4	Enric Mas (ESP)	Movistar Team	+ 32"
5	Hugh Carthy (GBR)	EF Pro Cycling	+ 38"
6	Sepp Kuss (USA)	Team Jumbo–Visma	+ 44"
7	Felix Großschartner (AUT)	Bora–Hansgrohe	+ 1' 17"
8	Esteban Chaves (COL)	Mitchelton–Scott	+ 1' 29"
9	Marc Soler (ESP)	Movistar Team	+ 1' 55"
10	George Bennett (NZL)	Team Jumbo–Visma	+ 1' 57"

== Stage 6 ==
25 October 2020 – Biescas to Aramón Formigal, 146.4 km (91.0 mi)

Stage 6 Result
Rank	Rider	Team	Time
1	Ion Izagirre (ESP)	Astana	3h 41' 00"
2	Michael Woods (CAN)	EF Pro Cycling	+ 25"
3	Rui Costa (POR)	UAE Team Emirates	+ 25"
4	Robert Power (AUS)	Team Sunweb	+ 27"
5	Michael Valgren (DEN)	NTT Pro Cycling	+ 27"
6	Guillaume Martin (FRA)	Cofidis	+ 27"
7	Mattia Cattaneo (ITA)	Deceuninck–Quick-Step	+ 38"
8	Hugh Carthy (GBR)	EF Pro Cycling	+ 48"
9	Gorka Izagirre (ESP)	Astana	+ 53"
10	Sergio Henao (COL)	UAE Team Emirates	+ 55"

General classification after Stage 6
Rank	Rider	Team	Time
1	Richard Carapaz (ECU)	INEOS Grenadiers	24h 34' 39"
2	Hugh Carthy (GBR)	EF Pro Cycling	+ 18"
3	Dan Martin (IRL)	Israel Start-Up Nation	+ 20"
4	Primož Roglič (SLO)	Team Jumbo–Visma	+ 30"
5	Enric Mas (ESP)	Movistar Team	+ 1' 07"
6	Felix Großschartner (AUT)	Bora–Hansgrohe	+ 1' 30"
7	Marc Soler (ESP)	Movistar Team	+ 1' 42"
8	Esteban Chaves (COL)	Mitchelton–Scott	+ 2' 02"
9	David de la Cruz (ESP)	UAE Team Emirates	+ 2' 46"
10	Alejandro Valverde (ESP)	Movistar Team	+ 3' 00"

== Rest day 1 ==
26 October 2020 – Vitoria-Gasteiz

== Stage 7 ==
27 October 2020 – Vitoria-Gasteiz to Villanueva de Valdegovia, 159.7 km (99.2 mi)

Stage 7 Result
Rank	Rider	Team	Time
1	Michael Woods (CAN)	EF Pro Cycling	3h 48' 16"
2	Omar Fraile (ESP)	Astana	+ 4"
3	Alejandro Valverde (ESP)	Movistar Team	+ 4"
4	Nans Peters (FRA)	AG2R La Mondiale	+ 8"
5	Guillaume Martin (FRA)	Cofidis	+ 8"
6	Rui Costa (POR)	UAE Team Emirates	+ 13"
7	Alex Aranburu (ESP)	Astana	+ 13"
8	Ide Schelling (NED)	Bora–Hansgrohe	+ 13"
9	Kenny Elissonde (FRA)	Trek–Segafredo	+ 13"
10	Davide Formolo (ITA)	UAE Team Emirates	+ 13"

General classification after Stage 7
Rank	Rider	Team	Time
1	Richard Carapaz (ECU)	INEOS Grenadiers	28h 23' 51"
2	Hugh Carthy (GBR)	EF Pro Cycling	+ 18"
3	Dan Martin (IRL)	Israel Start-Up Nation	+ 20"
4	Primož Roglič (SLO)	Team Jumbo–Visma	+ 30"
5	Enric Mas (ESP)	Movistar Team	+ 1' 07"
6	Felix Großschartner (AUT)	Bora–Hansgrohe	+ 1' 30"
7	Marc Soler (ESP)	Movistar Team	+ 1' 42"
8	Esteban Chaves (COL)	Mitchelton–Scott	+ 2' 02"
9	Alejandro Valverde (ESP)	Movistar Team	+ 2' 03"
10	George Bennett (NZL)	Team Jumbo–Visma	+ 2' 39"

== Stage 8 ==
28 October 2020 – Logroño to Alto de Moncalvillo, 164 km (102 mi)

Stage 8 Result
Rank	Rider	Team	Time
1	Primož Roglič (SLO)	Team Jumbo–Visma	4h 07' 08"
2	Richard Carapaz (ECU)	INEOS Grenadiers	+ 13"
3	Dan Martin (IRL)	Israel Start-Up Nation	+ 19"
4	Aleksandr Vlasov (RUS)	Astana	+ 25"
5	Hugh Carthy (GBR)	EF Pro Cycling	+ 33"
6	Wout Poels (NED)	Bahrain–McLaren	+ 35"
7	Enric Mas (ESP)	Movistar Team	+ 54"
8	Sepp Kuss (USA)	Team Jumbo–Visma	+ 54"
9	Esteban Chaves (COL)	Mitchelton–Scott	+ 1' 33"
10	Clément Champoussin (FRA)	AG2R La Mondiale	+ 1' 37"

General classification after Stage 8
Rank	Rider	Team	Time
1	Richard Carapaz (ECU)	INEOS Grenadiers	32h 31' 06"
2	Primož Roglič (SLO)	Team Jumbo–Visma	+ 13"
3	Dan Martin (IRL)	Israel Start-Up Nation	+ 28"
4	Hugh Carthy (GBR)	EF Pro Cycling	+ 44"
5	Enric Mas (ESP)	Movistar Team	+ 1' 54"
6	Felix Großschartner (AUT)	Bora–Hansgrohe	+ 3' 28"
7	Esteban Chaves (COL)	Mitchelton–Scott	+ 3' 28"
8	Alejandro Valverde (ESP)	Movistar Team	+ 3' 35"
9	Marc Soler (ESP)	Movistar Team	+ 3' 40"
10	Wout Poels (NED)	Bahrain–McLaren	+ 3' 47"

== Stage 9 ==
29 October 2020 – Castrillo del Val to Aguilar de Campoo, 157.7 km (98.0 mi)

Pascal Ackermann of Bora–Hansgrohe was promoted to the winner of the stage after original stage winner Sam Bennett of Deceuninck–Quick-Step was relegated by the race jury for aggressively shoulder barging into Emīls Liepiņš of Trek–Segafredo in the run-in to the sprint.

Stage 9 Result
Rank	Rider	Team	Time
1	Pascal Ackermann (GER)	Bora–Hansgrohe	3h 39' 55"
2	Gerben Thijssen (BEL)	Lotto–Soudal	+ 0"
3	Max Kanter (GER)	Team Sunweb	+ 0"
4	Jasper Philipsen (BEL)	UAE Team Emirates	+ 0"
5	Jakub Mareczko (ITA)	CCC Team	+ 0"
6	Alexis Renard (FRA)	Israel Start-Up Nation	+ 0"
7	Jon Aberasturi (ESP)	Caja Rural–Seguros RGA	+ 0"
8	Lorrenzo Manzin (FRA)	Total Direct Énergie	+ 0"
9	Robert Stannard (AUS)	Mitchelton–Scott	+ 0"
10	Reinardt Janse van Rensburg (RSA)	NTT Pro Cycling	+ 0"

General classification after Stage 9
Rank	Rider	Team	Time
1	Richard Carapaz (ECU)	INEOS Grenadiers	36h 11' 01"
2	Primož Roglič (SLO)	Team Jumbo–Visma	+ 13"
3	Dan Martin (IRL)	Israel Start-Up Nation	+ 28"
4	Hugh Carthy (GBR)	EF Pro Cycling	+ 44"
5	Enric Mas (ESP)	Movistar Team	+ 1' 54"
6	Felix Großschartner (AUT)	Bora–Hansgrohe	+ 3' 28"
7	Esteban Chaves (COL)	Mitchelton–Scott	+ 3' 28"
8	Alejandro Valverde (ESP)	Movistar Team	+ 3' 35"
9	Marc Soler (ESP)	Movistar Team	+ 3' 40"
10	Wout Poels (NED)	Bahrain–McLaren	+ 3' 47"
