= 2020 Vuelta a España, Stage 10 to Stage 18 =

Cycling race stages

The 2020 Vuelta a España is the 75th edition of the Vuelta a España, one of cycling's Grand Tours. The Vuelta began in Irun with an hilly stage on 20 October, and Stage 10 will occur on 30 October with a stage from Castro Urdiales. The race will finish in Madrid on 8 November.

== Classification standings ==
Legend
A red jersey.	Denotes the leader of the general classification	A white jersey.	Denotes the leader of the young rider classification
A green jersey.	Denotes the leader of the points classification	A white jersey with a red number bib.	Denotes the leader of the team classification
A blue polka dot jersey.	Denotes the leader of the mountains classification	A white jersey with a yellow number bib.	Denotes the winner of the combativity award

== Stage 10 ==
30 October 2020 – Castro Urdiales to Suances, 185 km (115 mi)

Stage 10 Result
Rank	Rider	Team	Time
1	Primož Roglič (SLO)	Team Jumbo–Visma	4h 14' 11"
2	Felix Großschartner (AUT)	Bora–Hansgrohe	+ 0"
3	Andrea Bagioli (ITA)	Deceuninck–Quick-Step	+ 0"
4	Alex Aranburu (ESP)	Astana	+ 0"
5	Robert Stannard (AUS)	Mitchelton–Scott	+ 0"
6	Julien Simon (FRA)	Total Direct Énergie	+ 0"
7	Dan Martin (IRL)	Israel Start-Up Nation	+ 0"
8	Guillaume Martin (FRA)	Cofidis	+ 0"
9	Jasper Philipsen (BEL)	UAE Team Emirates	+ 3"
10	Magnus Cort (DEN)	EF Pro Cycling	+ 3"

General classification after Stage 10
Rank	Rider	Team	Time
1	Primož Roglič (SLO)	Team Jumbo–Visma	40h 25' 15"
2	Richard Carapaz (ECU)	INEOS Grenadiers	+ 0"
3	Dan Martin (IRL)	Israel Start-Up Nation	+ 25"
4	Hugh Carthy (GBR)	EF Pro Cycling	+ 51"
5	Enric Mas (ESP)	Movistar Team	+ 1' 54"
6	Felix Großschartner (AUT)	Bora–Hansgrohe	+ 3' 19"
7	Esteban Chaves (COL)	Mitchelton–Scott	+ 3' 28"
8	Alejandro Valverde (ESP)	Movistar Team	+ 3' 35"
9	Wout Poels (NED)	Bahrain–McLaren	+ 3' 47"
10	Marc Soler (ESP)	Movistar Team	+ 3' 52"

== Stage 11 ==
31 October 2020 – Villaviciosa to Alto de la Farrapona, 170 km (110 mi)

Stage 11 Result
Rank	Rider	Team	Time
1	David Gaudu (FRA)	Groupama–FDJ	4h 54' 13"
2	Marc Soler (ESP)	Movistar Team	+ 4"
3	Michael Storer (AUS)	Team Sunweb	+ 52"
4	Mark Donovan (GBR)	Team Sunweb	+ 52"
5	Guillaume Martin (FRA)	Cofidis	+ 55"
6	Aleksandr Vlasov (RUS)	Astana	+ 58"
7	Dan Martin (IRL)	Israel Start-Up Nation	+ 1' 03"
8	Enric Mas (ESP)	Movistar Team	+ 1' 03"
9	Richard Carapaz (ECU)	INEOS Grenadiers	+ 1' 03"
10	Primož Roglič (SLO)	Team Jumbo–Visma	+ 1' 03"

General classification after Stage 11
Rank	Rider	Team	Time
1	Primož Roglič (SLO)	Team Jumbo–Visma	45h 20' 31"
2	Richard Carapaz (ECU)	INEOS Grenadiers	+ 0"
3	Dan Martin (IRL)	Israel Start-Up Nation	+ 25"
4	Hugh Carthy (GBR)	EF Pro Cycling	+ 58"
5	Enric Mas (ESP)	Movistar Team	+ 1' 54"
6	Marc Soler (ESP)	Movistar Team	+ 2' 44"
7	Felix Großschartner (AUT)	Bora–Hansgrohe	+ 3' 31"
8	Alejandro Valverde (ESP)	Movistar Team	+ 3' 44"
9	Wout Poels (NED)	Bahrain–McLaren	+ 3' 54"
10	Mikel Nieve (ESP)	Mitchelton–Scott	+ 4' 43"

== Stage 12 ==
1 November 2020 – La Pola Llaviana to Alto de L'Angliru, 109.4 km (68.0 mi)

Stage 12 Result
Rank	Rider	Team	Time
1	Hugh Carthy (GBR)	EF Pro Cycling	3h 08' 40"
2	Aleksandr Vlasov (RUS)	Astana	+ 16"
3	Enric Mas (ESP)	Movistar Team	+ 16"
4	Richard Carapaz (ECU)	INEOS Grenadiers	+ 16"
5	Primož Roglič (SLO)	Team Jumbo–Visma	+ 26"
6	Sepp Kuss (USA)	Team Jumbo–Visma	+ 26"
7	Dan Martin (IRL)	Israel Start-Up Nation	+ 26"
8	Wout Poels (NED)	Bahrain–McLaren	+ 1' 35"
9	Michael Woods (CAN)	EF Pro Cycling	+ 1' 35"
10	Felix Großschartner (AUT)	Bora–Hansgrohe	+ 2' 15"

General classification after Stage 12
Rank	Rider	Team	Time
1	Richard Carapaz (ECU)	INEOS Grenadiers	48h 29' 27"
2	Primož Roglič (SLO)	Team Jumbo–Visma	+ 10"
3	Hugh Carthy (GBR)	EF Pro Cycling	+ 32"
4	Dan Martin (IRL)	Israel Start-Up Nation	+ 35"
5	Enric Mas (ESP)	Movistar Team	+ 1' 50"
6	Wout Poels (NED)	Bahrain–McLaren	+ 5' 13"
7	Felix Großschartner (AUT)	Bora–Hansgrohe	+ 5' 30"
8	Alejandro Valverde (ESP)	Movistar Team	+ 6' 22"
9	Aleksandr Vlasov (RUS)	Astana	+ 6' 41"
10	Mikel Nieve (ESP)	Mitchelton–Scott	+ 6' 42"

== Rest day 2 ==
2 November 2020 – A Coruña

== Stage 13 ==
3 November 2020 – Muros to Mirador de Ézaro, 33.7 km (20.9 mi) (ITT)

Stage 13 Result
Rank	Rider	Team	Time
1	Primož Roglič (SLO)	Team Jumbo–Visma	46' 39"
2	Will Barta (USA)	CCC Team	+ 1"
3	Nelson Oliveira (POR)	Movistar Team	+ 10"
4	Hugh Carthy (GBR)	EF Pro Cycling	+ 25"
5	Bruno Armirail (FRA)	Groupama–FDJ	+ 41"
6	Mattia Cattaneo (ITA)	Deceuninck–Quick-Step	+ 46"
7	Richard Carapaz (ECU)	INEOS Grenadiers	+ 49"
8	Rémi Cavagna (FRA)	Deceuninck–Quick-Step	+ 58"
9	David de la Cruz (ESP)	UAE Team Emirates	+ 59"
10	Jasha Sütterlin (GER)	Team Sunweb	+ 1' 07"

General classification after Stage 13
Rank	Rider	Team	Time
1	Primož Roglič (SLO)	Team Jumbo–Visma	49h 16' 16"
2	Richard Carapaz (ECU)	INEOS Grenadiers	+ 39"
3	Hugh Carthy (GBR)	EF Pro Cycling	+ 47"
4	Dan Martin (IRL)	Israel Start-Up Nation	+ 1' 42"
5	Enric Mas (ESP)	Movistar Team	+ 3' 23"
6	Wout Poels (NED)	Bahrain–McLaren	+ 6' 15"
7	Felix Großschartner (AUT)	Bora–Hansgrohe	+ 7' 14"
8	Alejandro Valverde (ESP)	Movistar Team	+ 8' 39"
9	Aleksandr Vlasov (RUS)	Astana	+ 8' 48"
10	David de la Cruz (ESP)	UAE Team Emirates	+ 9' 23"

== Stage 14 ==
4 November 2020 – Lugo to Ourense, 204.7 km (127.2 mi)

Stage 14 Result
Rank	Rider	Team	Time
1	Tim Wellens (BEL)	Lotto–Soudal	4h 37' 05"
2	Michael Woods (CAN)	EF Pro Cycling	+ 0"
3	Zdeněk Štybar (CZE)	Deceuninck–Quick-Step	+ 0"
4	Dylan van Baarle (NED)	INEOS Grenadiers	+ 0"
5	Marc Soler (ESP)	Movistar Team	+ 11"
6	Thymen Arensman (NED)	Team Sunweb	+ 13"
7	Pierre-Luc Périchon (FRA)	Cofidis	+ 3' 11"
8	Dan Martin (IRL)	Israel Start-Up Nation	+ 3' 44"
9	Gonzalo Serrano (ESP)	Caja Rural–Seguros RGA	+ 3' 44"
10	Primož Roglič (SLO)	Team Jumbo–Visma	+ 3' 44"

General classification after Stage 14
Rank	Rider	Team	Time
1	Primož Roglič (SLO)	Team Jumbo–Visma	53h 57' 05"
2	Richard Carapaz (ECU)	INEOS Grenadiers	+ 39"
3	Hugh Carthy (GBR)	EF Pro Cycling	+ 47"
4	Dan Martin (IRL)	Israel Start-Up Nation	+ 1' 42"
5	Enric Mas (ESP)	Movistar Team	+ 3' 23"
6	Wout Poels (NED)	Bahrain–McLaren	+ 6' 15"
7	Felix Großschartner (AUT)	Bora–Hansgrohe	+ 7' 14"
8	Alejandro Valverde (ESP)	Movistar Team	+ 8' 39"
9	Aleksandr Vlasov (RUS)	Astana	+ 8' 48"
10	David de la Cruz (ESP)	UAE Team Emirates	+ 9' 23"

== Stage 15 ==
5 November 2020 – Mos to Puebla de Sanabria, 230.8 km (143.4 mi)

Stage 15 Result
Rank	Rider	Team	Time
1	Jasper Philipsen (BEL)	UAE Team Emirates	6h 18' 57"
2	Pascal Ackermann (GER)	Bora–Hansgrohe	+ 0"
3	Jannik Steimle (GER)	Deceuninck–Quick-Step	+ 0"
4	Fred Wright (GBR)	Bahrain–McLaren	+ 0"
5	Dion Smith (NZL)	Mitchelton–Scott	+ 0"
6	Reinardt Janse van Rensburg (RSA)	NTT Pro Cycling	+ 0"
7	Magnus Cort (DEN)	EF Pro Cycling	+ 0"
8	Dorian Godon (FRA)	AG2R La Mondiale	+ 0"
9	Stan Dewulf (BEL)	Lotto–Soudal	+ 0"
10	Michael Mørkøv (DEN)	Deceuninck–Quick-Step	+ 0"

General classification after Stage 15
Rank	Rider	Team	Time
1	Primož Roglič (SLO)	Team Jumbo–Visma	60h 16' 02"
2	Richard Carapaz (ECU)	INEOS Grenadiers	+ 39"
3	Hugh Carthy (GBR)	EF Pro Cycling	+ 47"
4	Dan Martin (IRL)	Israel Start-Up Nation	+ 1' 42"
5	Enric Mas (ESP)	Movistar Team	+ 3' 23"
6	Wout Poels (NED)	Bahrain–McLaren	+ 6' 15"
7	Felix Großschartner (AUT)	Bora–Hansgrohe	+ 7' 14"
8	Alejandro Valverde (ESP)	Movistar Team	+ 8' 39"
9	Aleksandr Vlasov (RUS)	Astana	+ 8' 48"
10	David de la Cruz (ESP)	UAE Team Emirates	+ 9' 23"

== Stage 16 ==
6 November 2020 – Salamanca to Ciudad Rodrigo, 162 km (101 mi)

Stage 16 Result
Rank	Rider	Team	Time
1	Magnus Cort (DEN)	EF Pro Cycling	4h 04' 35"
2	Primož Roglič (SLO)	Team Jumbo–Visma	+ 0"
3	Dion Smith (NZL)	Mitchelton–Scott	+ 0"
4	Alejandro Valverde (ESP)	Movistar Team	+ 0"
5	Richard Carapaz (ECU)	INEOS Grenadiers	+ 0"
6	Felix Großschartner (AUT)	Bora–Hansgrohe	+ 0"
7	Dorian Godon (FRA)	AG2R La Mondiale	+ 0"
8	Michael Valgren (DEN)	NTT Pro Cycling	+ 0"
9	Jasha Sütterlin (GER)	Team Sunweb	+ 0"
10	Aleksandr Vlasov (RUS)	Astana	+ 0"

General classification after Stage 16
Rank	Rider	Team	Time
1	Primož Roglič (SLO)	Team Jumbo–Visma	64h 20' 31"
2	Richard Carapaz (ECU)	INEOS Grenadiers	+ 45"
3	Hugh Carthy (GBR)	EF Pro Cycling	+ 53"
4	Dan Martin (IRL)	Israel Start-Up Nation	+ 1' 48"
5	Enric Mas (ESP)	Movistar Team	+ 3' 29"
6	Wout Poels (NED)	Bahrain–McLaren	+ 6' 21"
7	Felix Großschartner (AUT)	Bora–Hansgrohe	+ 7' 20"
8	Alejandro Valverde (ESP)	Movistar Team	+ 8' 45"
9	Aleksandr Vlasov (RUS)	Astana	+ 8' 54"
10	David de la Cruz (ESP)	UAE Team Emirates	+ 9' 29"

== Stage 17 ==
7 November 2020 – Sequeros to Alto de la Covatilla, 178.2 km (110.7 mi)

Stage 17 Result
Rank	Rider	Team	Time
1	David Gaudu (FRA)	Groupama–FDJ	4h 54' 32"
2	Gino Mäder (SUI)	NTT Pro Cycling	+ 28"
3	Ion Izagirre (ESP)	Astana	+ 1' 05"
4	David de la Cruz (ESP)	UAE Team Emirates	+ 1' 05"
5	Mark Donovan (GBR)	Team Sunweb	+ 1' 53"
6	Michael Storer (AUS)	Team Sunweb	+ 1' 53"
7	Guillaume Martin (FRA)	Cofidis	+ 2' 23"
8	Richard Carapaz (ECU)	INEOS Grenadiers	+ 2' 35"
9	Hugh Carthy (GBR)	EF Pro Cycling	+ 2' 50"
10	Primož Roglič (SLO)	Team Jumbo–Visma	+ 2' 56"

General classification after Stage 17
Rank	Rider	Team	Time
1	Primož Roglič (SLO)	Team Jumbo–Visma	69h 17' 59"
2	Richard Carapaz (ECU)	INEOS Grenadiers	+ 24"
3	Hugh Carthy (GBR)	EF Pro Cycling	+ 47"
4	Dan Martin (IRL)	Israel Start-Up Nation	+ 2' 43"
5	Enric Mas (ESP)	Movistar Team	+ 3' 36"
6	Wout Poels (NED)	Bahrain–McLaren	+ 7' 16"
7	David de la Cruz (ESP)	UAE Team Emirates	+ 7' 35"
8	David Gaudu (FRA)	Groupama–FDJ	+ 7' 45"
9	Felix Großschartner (AUT)	Bora–Hansgrohe	+ 8' 15"
10	Alejandro Valverde (ESP)	Movistar Team	+ 9' 34"

== Stage 18 ==
8 November 2020 – Hipódromo de la Zarzuela to Madrid, 124.2 km (77.2 mi)

Stage 18 Result
Rank	Rider	Team	Time
1	Pascal Ackermann (GER)	Bora–Hansgrohe	3h 28' 13"
2	Sam Bennett (IRL)	Deceuninck–Quick-Step	+ 0"
3	Max Kanter (GER)	Team Sunweb	+ 0"
4	Jasper Philipsen (BEL)	UAE Team Emirates	+ 0"
5	Jasha Sütterlin (GER)	Team Sunweb	+ 0"
6	Emmanuel Morin (FRA)	Cofidis	+ 0"
7	Reinardt Janse van Rensburg (RSA)	NTT Pro Cycling	+ 0"
8	Lorrenzo Manzin (FRA)	Total Direct Énergie	+ 0"
9	Robert Stannard (AUS)	Mitchelton–Scott	+ 0"
10	Jon Aberasturi (ESP)	Caja Rural–Seguros RGA	+ 0"

General classification after Stage 18
Rank	Rider	Team	Time
1	Primož Roglič (SLO)	Team Jumbo–Visma	72h 46' 12"
2	Richard Carapaz (ECU)	INEOS Grenadiers	+ 24"
3	Hugh Carthy (GBR)	EF Pro Cycling	+ 1' 15"
4	Dan Martin (IRL)	Israel Start-Up Nation	+ 2' 43"
5	Enric Mas (ESP)	Movistar Team	+ 3' 36"
6	Wout Poels (NED)	Bahrain–McLaren	+ 7' 16"
7	David de la Cruz (ESP)	UAE Team Emirates	+ 7' 35"
8	David Gaudu (FRA)	Groupama–FDJ	+ 7' 45"
9	Felix Großschartner (AUT)	Bora–Hansgrohe	+ 8' 15"
10	Alejandro Valverde (ESP)	Movistar Team	+ 9' 34"
