= Moncalvillo =

- Municipality
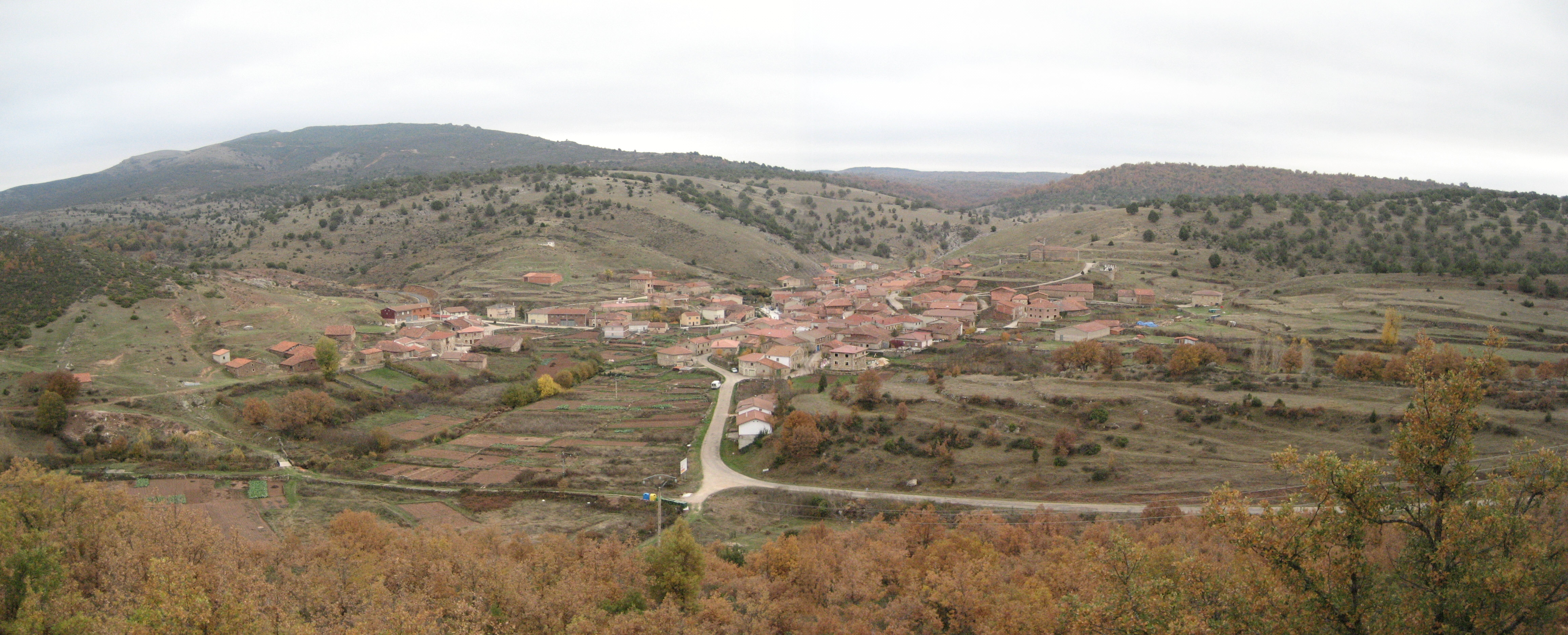
- Panoramic view of Moncalvillo, 2010

- Location in Spain Moncalvillo (Spain)
- Coordinates: 41°57′18″N 3°11′57″W
- Country: Spain
- Autonomous community: Castile and León
- Province: Burgos
- Comarca: Sierra de la Demanda

Government
  - Alcalde: Juan Ángel Elvira Benito (PP)

Area
  - Total: 26 km^{2} (10 sq mi)
- Elevation: 1,054 m (3,458 ft)

Population (2025-01-01)
  - Total: 77
  - Density: 3.0/km^{2} (7.7/sq mi)
- Time zone: UTC+1 (CET)
  - Summer (DST): UTC+2 (CEST)
- Postal code: 09691
- Website: http://www.moncalvillo.es/

Moncalvillo is a municipality and town located in the province of Burgos, Castile and León, Spain. According to the 2004 census (INE), the municipality has a population of 85 inhabitants.

== Vuelta a España ==
The road ascending from Logroño to the lakes is a climb in professional road bicycle racing, having been used by Vuelta a España twice. It is 8.6 kilometres long at an average gradient of 8.9% (height gain: 765 m).

=== Winners of the climb ===
Year	Stage winner	Race leader
2020	(Slovenia) Primož Roglič	(Ecuador) Richard Carapaz
2024	(Slovenia) Primož Roglič	(Slovenia) Primož Roglič
