= Kevin Inkelaar =

Dutch bicycle racer

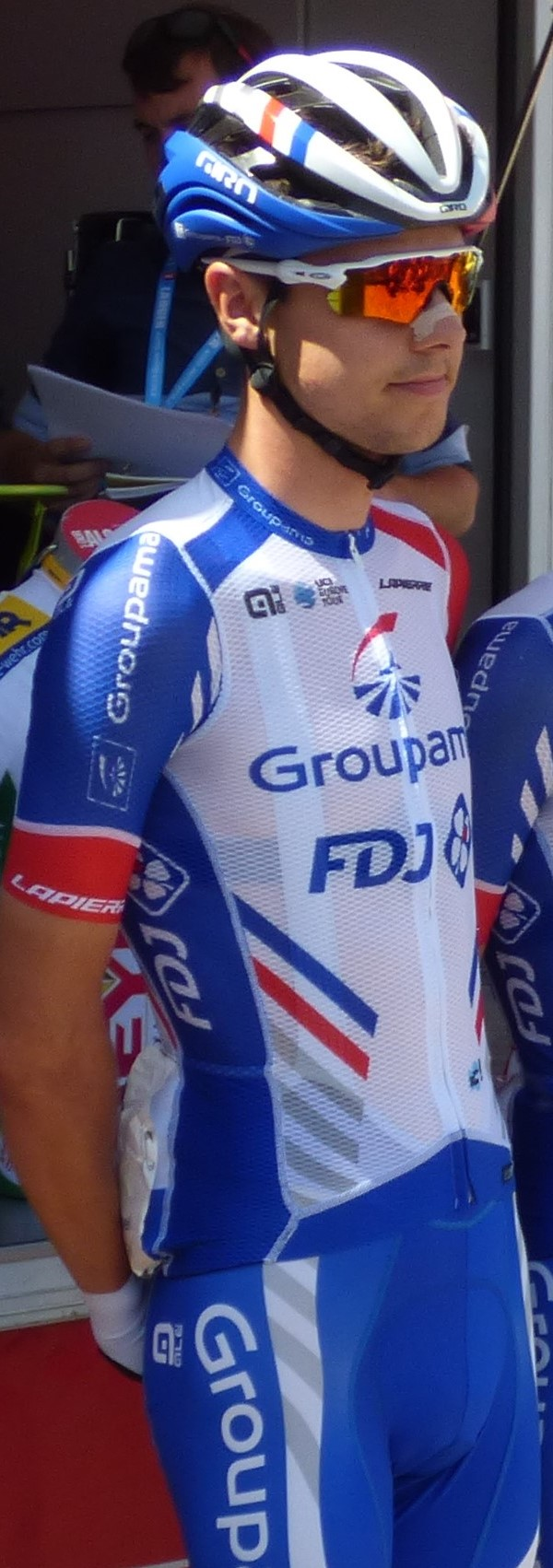
- Inkelaar in 2019

Personal information
- Full name: Kevin Inkelaar
- Born: 8 July 1997 (age 29) Leeuwarden, Netherlands
- Height: 1.81 m (5 ft 11 in)
- Weight: 64 kg (141 lb)

Cycling career
- Sport: Cycling
- Current team: Unibet Rose Rockets
- Discipline: Road
- Role: Rider

Amateur teams
- 2016–2017: Lotto–Soudal U23
- 2018: Roompot–Nederlandse Loterij (stagiaire)

Professional teams
- 2018: Polartec–Kometa
- 2019: Équipe Continentale Groupama–FDJ
- 2020–2021: Bahrain–McLaren
- 2022: Leopard Pro Cycling
- 2023–: TDT–Unibet Cycling Team

Kevin Inkelaar (born 8 July 1997) is a Dutch cyclist, who currently rides for UCI ProTeam Unibet Rose Rockets. In October 2020, he was named in the startlist for the 2020 Vuelta a España.

== Major results ==
2015
2nd Overall Tour du Valromey
2017
1st Stage 1 (TTT) Okolo Jižních Čech
2018
2nd Overall Giro della Valle d'Aosta

1st Stage 1

2019
3rd Overall Giro della Valle d'Aosta

1st Points classification
1st Stage 2

4th Overall Tour Alsace

=== Grand Tour general classification results timeline ===
Grand Tour	2020
Giro d'Italia	—
Tour de France	—
Vuelta a España	138

Legend
—	Did not compete
DNF	Did not finish
