= 2020 Vuelta a España =

75th edition of the Vuelta a España

2020 UCI World Tour, race 20 of 21
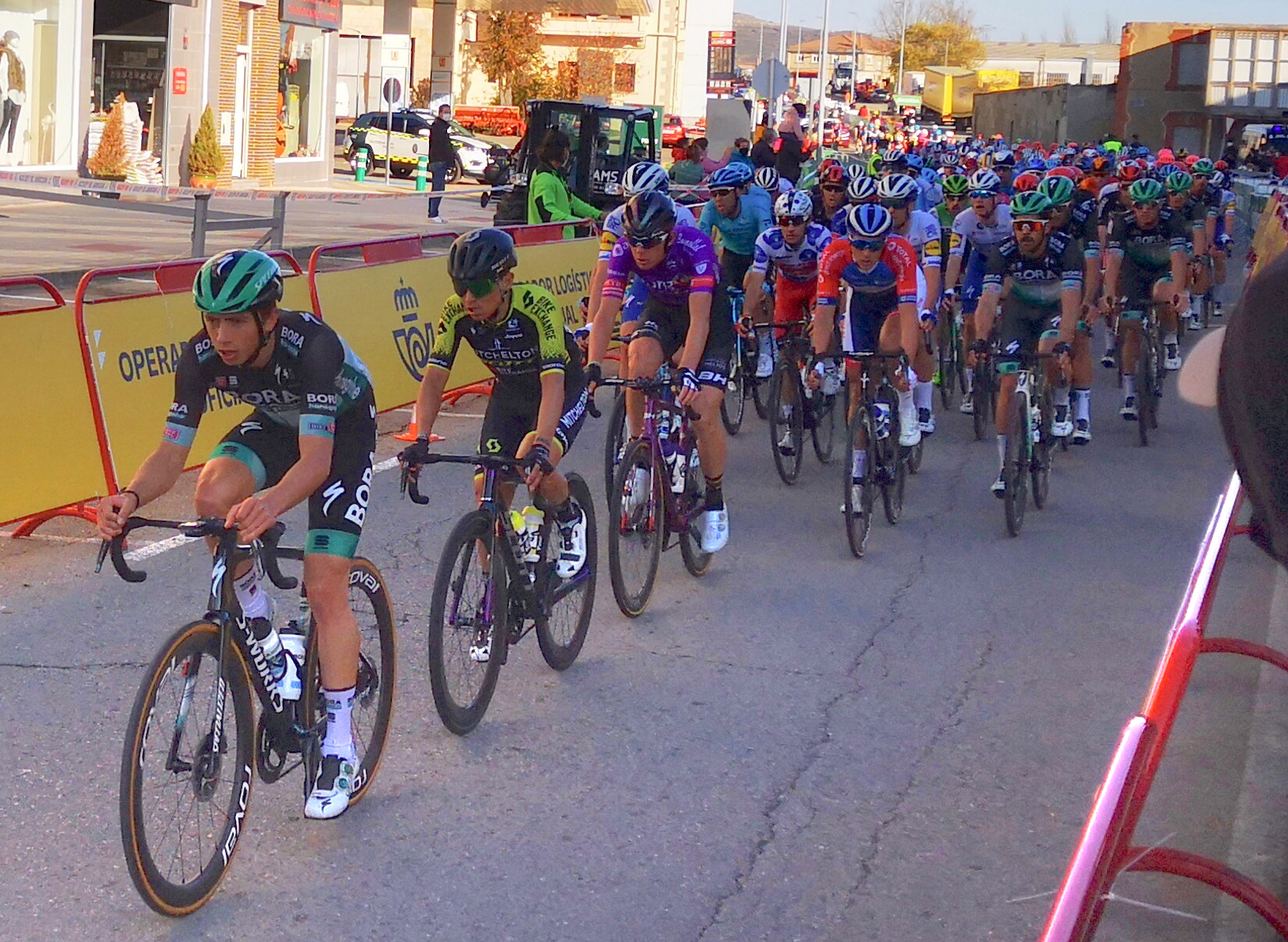
- Peloton in Stage 9

Race details
- Dates: 20 October – 8 November
- Stages: 18
- Distance: 2,892.6 km (1,797 mi)

Results
Jersey awarded to the overall winner	Winner	Primož Roglič (SLO)	(Team Jumbo–Visma)
	Second	Richard Carapaz (ECU)	(Ineos Grenadiers)
	Third	Hugh Carthy (GBR)	(EF Pro Cycling)
Jersey awarded to the points classification winner	Points	Primož Roglič (SLO)	(Team Jumbo–Visma)
Jersey awarded to the mountains classification winner	Mountains	Guillaume Martin (FRA)	(Cofidis)
Jersey awarded to the youth classification winner	Youth	Enric Mas (ESP)	(Movistar Team)
Jersey awarded to the combativity classification winner	Combativity	Rémi Cavagna (FRA)	(Deceuninck–Quick-Step)
Jersey awarded to the team classification winner	Team	(Spain) Movistar Team	

The 2020 Vuelta a España was the 75th edition of the Vuelta a España, one of cycling's three grand tours. It was won for the second consecutive year by Primož Roglič of Team Jumbo–Visma.

The race was originally scheduled to be held from 14 August to 6 September 2020. In April 2020, the 2020 Tour de France was rescheduled to run between the 29 August and 20 September, having been postponed in view of the COVID-19 pandemic. On 15 April, UCI announced that both the Giro d'Italia and the Vuelta would take place in autumn after the 2020 UCI Road World Championships. On 5 May, UCI announced that the postponed Giro and the Vuelta would run between 3 and 25 October and between 20 October and 8 November, respectively.

For the first time since 1985, the race was not 21 stages long; instead, it was held in a reduced format over 18 stages.

It was also among the closest Vueltas in history with the winning margin being only +0:24. The 2011 Vuelta a España was initially closer than the 2020 edition, but due to a doping incident the margins of victory changed. As such the 2020 Vuelta had the smallest margin of victory since the 1984 Vuelta a España, which was the smallest margin of victory of any grand tour in cycling history.

== Teams ==
Twenty-two teams made up the field that participated in the 2020 Vuelta a España. All nineteen UCI WorldTeams were entitled, and obliged, to enter the race. Additionally, three second-tier UCI ProTeams were invited to participate in the event. The teams were announced on 8 May 2020.

The teams participating in the race were:

UCI WorldTeams

- AG2R La Mondiale
- Astana
- Bahrain–McLaren
- Bora–Hansgrohe
- CCC Team
- Cofidis
- Deceuninck–Quick-Step
- EF Pro Cycling
- Groupama–FDJ
- Israel Start-Up Nation
- Lotto–Soudal
- Mitchelton–Scott
- Movistar Team
- NTT Pro Cycling
- Ineos Grenadiers
- Team Jumbo–Visma
- Team Sunweb
- Trek–Segafredo
- UAE Team Emirates

UCI ProTeams

- Burgos BH
- Caja Rural–Seguros RGA
- Total Direct Énergie

== Pre-race favourites ==
Defending champion Primož Roglič (Team Jumbo–Visma) was considered the pre-race favourite, followed by his teammate and 2017 Giro d'Italia champion Tom Dumoulin. Richard Carapaz (Ineos Grenadiers), winner of the 2019 Giro d'Italia, was seen as one of their main challengers, alongside Enric Mas (Movistar Team) and Thibaut Pinot (Groupama–FDJ). Aleksandr Vlasov (Astana) was also seen as a top contender, having unexpectedly abandoned the Giro d'Italia during the second stage. Other riders considered as contenders included two time former champion Chris Froome (Ineos Grenadiers), his teammate Iván Sosa, 2009 champion Alejandro Valverde (Movistar Team) and Team Jumbo–Visma's Sepp Kuss.

Riders believed to be the main contenders for victories on the sprint stages were Pascal Ackermann (Bora–Hansgrohe), Sam Bennett (Deceuninck–Quick-Step) and Jasper Philipsen (UAE Team Emirates).

== Route and stages ==
The full route of the 2020 Vuelta a España was announced on Tuesday 17 December 2019 in Madrid. The first three stages of the 2020 Vuelta were originally due to be held in the Netherlands, starting in Utrecht. This was due to be the fourth time the Vuelta has started outside Spain and the second start in the Netherlands, following the 2009 Vuelta a España. In hosting the start of the race, Utrecht was to become the first city to host stages of all three grand tours. However, on 29 April 2020, the organisers announced that the opening three stages in the Netherlands were cancelled, before confirming later that same day that the race would be shortened to 18 stages and, except for the cancelled stages, follow the exact same route as announced previously. As a result, for the first time since 1961, the race departed from the Basque Country.

Stage characteristics and winners
Stage	Date	Course	Distance	Type	Winner
1	20 October	Irun to Arrate	173 km (107 mi)	Hilly stage	Primož Roglič (SLO)
2	21 October	Pamplona to Lekunberri	151.6 km (94.2 mi)	Hilly stage	Marc Soler (ESP)
3	22 October	Lodosa to Laguna Negra de Urbión (Vinuesa)	166.1 km (103.2 mi)	Hilly stage	Dan Martin (IRL)
4	23 October	Garray to Ejea de los Caballeros	191.7 km (119.1 mi)	Flat stage	Sam Bennett (IRL)
5	24 October	Huesca to Sabiñánigo	184.4 km (114.6 mi)	Hilly stage	Tim Wellens (BEL)
6	25 October	Biescas to Aramón Formigal	146.4 km (91.0 mi) (Note: The stage was originally 136.6 km (84.9 mi) long and was due to finish atop the Col du Tourmalet, but due to French COVID-19 restrictions, the Vuelta was not allowed to enter France.)	Mountain stage	Ion Izagirre (ESP)
	26 October	Vitoria-Gasteiz		Rest day	
7	27 October	Vitoria-Gasteiz to Villanueva de Valdegovia	159.7 km (99.2 mi)	Hilly stage	Michael Woods (CAN)
8	28 October	Logroño to Alto de Moncalvillo	164 km (102 mi)	Mountain stage	Primož Roglič (SLO)
9	29 October	Castrillo del Val to Aguilar de Campoo	157.7 km (98.0 mi)	Flat stage	Pascal Ackermann (GER) (Note: Sam Bennett originally won the stage but was later relegated by the race jury for aggressively shoulder barging into Emīls Liepiņš in the run-in to the sprint.)
10	30 October	Castro Urdiales to Suances	185 km (115 mi)	Flat stage	Primož Roglič (SLO)
11	31 October	Villaviciosa to Alto de la Farrapona	170 km (110 mi)	Mountain stage	David Gaudu (FRA)
12	1 November	La Pola Llaviana to Alto de L'Angliru	109.4 km (68.0 mi)	Mountain stage	Hugh Carthy (GBR)
	2 November	A Coruña		Rest day	
13	3 November	Muros to Mirador de Ézaro	33.7 km (20.9 mi)	Mountain time trial	Primož Roglič (SLO)
14	4 November	Lugo to Ourense	204.7 km (127.2 mi)	Hilly stage	Tim Wellens (BEL)
15	5 November	Mos to Puebla de Sanabria	230.8 km (143.4 mi)	Hilly stage	Jasper Philipsen (BEL)
16	6 November	Salamanca to Ciudad Rodrigo	162 km (101 mi)	Hilly stage	Magnus Cort (DEN)
17	7 November	Sequeros to Alto de la Covatilla	178.2 km (110.7 mi)	Mountain stage	David Gaudu (FRA)
18	8 November	Hipódromo de la Zarzuela to Madrid	124.2 km (77.2 mi)	Flat stage	Pascal Ackermann (GER)
	Total		2,892.6 km (1,797.4 mi)		

== Classification leadership ==
The Vuelta a España has four individual classifications, for which jerseys were awarded daily to the leading rider, as well as a team competition. The primary classification is the general classification, which is calculated by adding each rider's finishing times on each stage. Time bonuses will be awarded at the end of every stage apart from the individual time trial (stage 13). The rider with the lowest cumulative time is the leader of the general classification, and wears the red jersey. The leader of the general classification at the end of the race is considered the overall winner of the Vuelta a España.

The second classification is the points classification. Riders receive points for finishing among the highest placed in a stage finish, or in intermediate sprints during the stages. The points available for each stage finish are the same regardless of the stage's type, unlike in the Tour de France and Giro d'Italia, in which wins in flat stages are worth up to 2.5 times more points than wins in mountain stages. As a result the winner of this classification is often also a contender for the overall win. The leader is identified by a green jersey.

Mountains classification points
Category	1st	2nd	3rd	4th	5th	6th
Cima Alberto Fernández	20	15	10	6	4	2
Special-category	15	10	6	4	2	
First-category	10	6	4	2	1	
Second-category	5	3	1			
Third-category	3	2	1			

The next classification is the mountains classification. Points are awarded to the riders that reach the summit of the most difficult climbs first. The climbs are categorized, in order of increasing difficulty, third-, second-, and first- and special-category. The leader wears a white jersey with blue polka dots.

The last of the individual classifications is the young rider classification, which is calculated by adding each rider's finishing times on each stage for each rider born on or after 1 January 1995. The rider with the lowest cumulative time is the leader of the young rider classification, and wears the white jersey.

There is also the team classification. After each stage, the times of the three highest finishers of each team are added together, and all the members of the leading team wear a red number bib on the following stage. The victory is awarded to the team with the lowest cumulative time at the end of the event.

In addition, there is one individual award: the combativity award. This award is given after each stage (excluding the individual time trial) to the rider "who displayed the most generous effort and best sporting spirit." The daily winner wears a yellow number bib the following stage. At the end of the Vuelta, a jury decides the top three riders for the “Most Combative Rider of La Vuelta”, with a public vote deciding the victor.

Classification leadership by stage
Stage	Winner	General classification	Points classification	Mountains classification	Young rider classification	Team classification	Combativity award
1	Primož Roglič	Primož Roglič	Primož Roglič	Sepp Kuss	Enric Mas	Team Jumbo–Visma	Jetse Bol
2	Marc Soler	Primož Roglič	Primož Roglič	Richard Carapaz	Enric Mas	Team Jumbo–Visma	Gonzalo Serrano
3	Dan Martin	Primož Roglič	Primož Roglič	Richard Carapaz	Enric Mas	Team Jumbo–Visma	Willie Smit
4	Sam Bennett	Primož Roglič	Primož Roglič	Richard Carapaz	Enric Mas	Team Jumbo–Visma	Jesús Ezquerra
5	Tim Wellens	Primož Roglič	Primož Roglič	Tim Wellens	Enric Mas	Team Jumbo–Visma	Guillaume Martin
6	Ion Izagirre	Richard Carapaz	Primož Roglič	Tim Wellens	Enric Mas	Movistar Team	Gorka Izagirre
7	Michael Woods	Richard Carapaz	Primož Roglič	Guillaume Martin	Enric Mas	Movistar Team	Alejandro Valverde
8	Primož Roglič	Richard Carapaz	Primož Roglič	Guillaume Martin	Enric Mas	Movistar Team	Stan Dewulf
9	Pascal Ackermann	Richard Carapaz	Primož Roglič	Guillaume Martin	Enric Mas	Movistar Team	Juan Felipe Osorio
10	Primož Roglič	Primož Roglič	Primož Roglič	Guillaume Martin	Enric Mas	Movistar Team	Alex Molenaar
11	David Gaudu	Primož Roglič	Primož Roglič	Guillaume Martin	Enric Mas	Movistar Team	Marc Soler
12	Hugh Carthy	Richard Carapaz	Primož Roglič	Guillaume Martin	Enric Mas	Movistar Team	Guillaume Martin
13	Primož Roglič	Primož Roglič	Primož Roglič	Guillaume Martin	Enric Mas	Movistar Team	not awarded
14	Tim Wellens	Primož Roglič	Primož Roglič	Guillaume Martin	Enric Mas	Movistar Team	Marc Soler
15	Jasper Philipsen	Primož Roglič	Primož Roglič	Guillaume Martin	Enric Mas	Movistar Team	Guillaume Martin
16	Magnus Cort	Primož Roglič	Primož Roglič	Guillaume Martin	Enric Mas	Movistar Team	Rémi Cavagna
17	David Gaudu	Primož Roglič	Primož Roglič	Guillaume Martin	Enric Mas	Movistar Team	Marc Soler
18	Pascal Ackermann	Primož Roglič	Primož Roglič	Guillaume Martin	Enric Mas	Movistar Team	not awarded
Final		Primož Roglič	Primož Roglič	Guillaume Martin	Enric Mas	Movistar Team	Rémi Cavagna

- On stages 2, 11, and 14–18, Richard Carapaz, who was second in the points classification, wore the green jersey, because first placed Primož Roglič wore the red jersey as the leader of the general classification.
- On stage 3, Dan Martin, who was third in the points classification, wore the green jersey, because first placed Primož Roglič wore the red jersey as the leader of the general classification, and second placed Richard Carapaz wore the blue polka dot jersey as the leader of the mountains classification. Martin also wore the green jersey on stages 4–6 and 12 as he had moved up to second in the points classification.

== Final classification standings ==
Legend
A red jersey.	Denotes the winner of the general classification	A white jersey.	Denotes the winner of the young rider classification
A green jersey.	Denotes the winner of the points classification	A white jersey with a red number bib.	Denotes the winner of the team classification
A blue polka dot jersey.	Denotes the winner of the mountains classification	A white jersey with a yellow number bib.	Denotes the winner of the combativity award

=== General classification ===
Final general classification (1–10)
Rank	Rider	Team	Time
1	Primož Roglič (SLO)	Team Jumbo–Visma	72h 46' 12"
2	Richard Carapaz (ECU)	Ineos Grenadiers	+ 24"
3	Hugh Carthy (GBR)	EF Pro Cycling	+ 1' 15"
4	Dan Martin (IRL)	Israel Start-Up Nation	+ 2' 43"
5	Enric Mas (ESP)	Movistar Team	+ 3' 36"
6	Wout Poels (NED)	Bahrain–McLaren	+ 7' 16"
7	David de la Cruz (ESP)	UAE Team Emirates	+ 7' 35"
8	David Gaudu (FRA)	Groupama–FDJ	+ 7' 45"
9	Felix Großschartner (AUT)	Bora–Hansgrohe	+ 8' 15"
10	Alejandro Valverde (ESP)	Movistar Team	+ 9' 34"

Final general classification (11–142)
Rank	Rider	Team	Time
11	Aleksandr Vlasov (RUS)	Astana	+ 9' 36"
12	George Bennett (NZL)	Team Jumbo–Visma	+ 14' 04"
13	Mikel Nieve (ESP)	Mitchelton–Scott	+ 14' 47"
14	Guillaume Martin (FRA)	Cofidis	+ 15' 07"
15	Sergio Henao (COL)	UAE Team Emirates	+ 15' 36"
16	Sepp Kuss (USA)	Team Jumbo–Visma	+ 16' 26"
17	Mattia Cattaneo (ITA)	Deceuninck–Quick-Step	+ 17' 45"
18	Marc Soler (ESP)	Movistar Team	+ 21' 01"
19	Gorka Izagirre (ESP)	Astana	+ 21' 46"
20	Gino Mäder (SUI)	NTT Pro Cycling	+ 43' 39"
21	Georg Zimmermann (GER)	CCC Team	+ 45' 40"
22	Will Barta (USA)	CCC Team	+ 50' 04"
23	Luis Ángel Maté (ESP)	Cofidis	+ 55' 06"
24	Kobe Goossens (BEL)	Lotto–Soudal	+ 1h 02' 57"
25	Nick Schultz (AUS)	Mitchelton–Scott	+ 1h 03' 46"
26	José Herrada (ESP)	Cofidis	+ 1h 05' 17"
27	Esteban Chaves (COL)	Mitchelton–Scott	+ 1h 09' 51"
28	Bruno Armirail (FRA)	Groupama–FDJ	+ 1h 10' 22"
29	Ion Izagirre (ESP)	Astana	+ 1h 12' 12"
30	Carlos Verona (ESP)	Movistar Team	+ 1h 13' 22"
31	Clément Champoussin (FRA)	AG2R La Mondiale	+ 1h 21' 20"
32	José Joaquín Rojas (ESP)	Movistar Team	+ 1h 22' 36"
33	Michael Valgren (DEN)	NTT Pro Cycling	+ 1h 29' 17"
34	Michael Woods (CAN)	EF Pro Cycling	+ 1h 29' 26"
35	Robert Gesink (NED)	Team Jumbo–Visma	+ 1h 30' 31"
36	Nans Peters (FRA)	AG2R La Mondiale	+ 1h 30' 35"
37	Robert Power (AUS)	Team Sunweb	+ 1h 33' 58"
38	Dorian Godon (FRA)	AG2R La Mondiale	+ 1h 42' 00"
39	Nelson Oliveira (POR)	Movistar Team	+ 1h 42' 02"
40	Michael Storer (AUS)	Team Sunweb	+ 1h 43' 56"
41	Thymen Arensman (NED)	Team Sunweb	+ 1h 49' 10"
42	Juan Pedro López (ESP)	Trek–Segafredo	+ 1h 51' 00"
43	Ángel Madrazo (ESP)	Burgos BH	+ 1h 54' 24"
44	Rui Costa (POR)	UAE Team Emirates	+ 1h 54' 48"
45	Romain Sicard (FRA)	Total Direct Énergie	+ 1h 55' 44"
46	Jonas Vingegaard (DEN)	Team Jumbo–Visma	+ 1h 57' 00"
47	Imanol Erviti (ESP)	Movistar Team	+ 1h 57' 22"
48	Mark Donovan (GBR)	Team Sunweb	+ 1h 58' 52"
49	Dylan van Baarle (NED)	Ineos Grenadiers	+ 1h 59' 36"
50	Julen Amezqueta (ESP)	Caja Rural–Seguros RGA	+ 1h 59' 58"
51	Lennard Hofstede (NED)	Team Jumbo–Visma	+ 1h 59' 59"
52	Andrey Amador (CRC)	Ineos Grenadiers	+ 2h 10' 34"
53	Santiago Buitrago (COL)	Bahrain–McLaren	+ 2h 14' 34"
54	Tsgabu Grmay (ETH)	Mitchelton–Scott	+ 2h 15' 16"
55	Jasha Sütterlin (GER)	Team Sunweb	+ 2h 16' 38"
56	Jan Hirt (CZE)	CCC Team	+ 2h 20' 00"
57	Gonzalo Serrano (ESP)	Caja Rural–Seguros RGA	+ 2h 20' 05"
58	Merhawi Kudus (ERI)	Astana	+ 2h 20' 11"
59	Niklas Eg (DEN)	Trek–Segafredo	+ 2h 24' 36"
60	Michel Ries (LUX)	Trek–Segafredo	+ 2h 25' 50"
61	Jonathan Lastra (ESP)	Caja Rural–Seguros RGA	+ 2h 29' 21"
62	Iván Sosa (COL)	Ineos Grenadiers	+ 2h 30' 01"
63	Óscar Cabedo (ESP)	Burgos BH	+ 2h 30' 26"
64	Omar Fraile (ESP)	Astana	+ 2h 33' 31"
65	Julien Simon (FRA)	Total Direct Énergie	+ 2h 35' 29"
66	Anthony Roux (FRA)	Groupama–FDJ	+ 2h 36' 06"
67	Magnus Cort (DEN)	EF Pro Cycling	+ 2h 38' 21"
68	Olivier Le Gac (FRA)	Groupama–FDJ	+ 2h 41' 22"
69	Ide Schelling (NED)	Bora–Hansgrohe	+ 2h 46' 53"
70	Stan Dewulf (BEL)	Lotto–Soudal	+ 2h 48' 18"
71	Jhojan García (COL)	Caja Rural–Seguros RGA	+ 2h 48' 52"
72	Reto Hollenstein (SUI)	Israel Start-Up Nation	+ 2h 51' 56"
73	Willie Smit (RSA)	Burgos BH	+ 2h 52' 11"
74	Dion Smith (NZL)	Mitchelton–Scott	+ 2h 54' 19"
75	Alex Aranburu (ESP)	Astana	+ 2h 54' 43"
76	Robert Stannard (AUS)	Mitchelton–Scott	+ 2h 56' 02"
77	Jorge Arcas (ESP)	Movistar Team	+ 2h 58' 22"
78	Tim Wellens (BEL)	Lotto–Soudal	+ 3h 05' 52"
79	Paul Ourselin (FRA)	Total Direct Énergie	+ 3h 06' 13"
80	Jetse Bol (NED)	Burgos BH	+ 3h 13' 59"
81	Victor Lafay (FRA)	Cofidis	+ 3h 18' 11"
82	Koen de Kort (NED)	Trek–Segafredo	+ 3h 18' 29"
83	Jannik Steimle (GER)	Deceuninck–Quick-Step	+ 3h 18' 31"
84	Rémi Cavagna (FRA)	Deceuninck–Quick-Step	+ 3h 18' 33"
85	Jasper Philipsen (BEL)	UAE Team Emirates	+ 3h 21' 10"
86	Jonathan Hivert (FRA)	Total Direct Énergie	+ 3h 22' 59"
87	Valentin Ferron (FRA)	Total Direct Énergie	+ 3h 24' 10"
88	Callum Scotson (AUS)	Mitchelton–Scott	+ 3h 24' 18"
89	Jesús Ezquerra (ESP)	Burgos BH	+ 3h 25' 04"
90	Alexandr Riabushenko (BLR)	UAE Team Emirates	+ 3h 26' 12"
91	Alfred Wright (GBR)	Bahrain–McLaren	+ 3h 27' 20"
92	Aritz Bagües (ESP)	Caja Rural–Seguros RGA	+ 3h 29' 48"
93	Dmitriy Gruzdev (KAZ)	Astana	+ 3h 30' 29"
94	Stefan De Bod (RSA)	NTT Pro Cycling	+ 3h 30' 39"
95	Cameron Wurf (AUS)	Ineos Grenadiers	+ 3h 31' 14"
96	Tosh Van der Sande (BEL)	Lotto–Soudal	+ 3h 31' 47"
97	Pierre-Luc Périchon (FRA)	Cofidis	+ 3h 32' 01"
98	Chris Froome (GBR)	Ineos Grenadiers	+ 3h 32' 14"
99	Ricardo Vilela (POR)	Burgos BH	+ 3h 32' 34"
100	Brent Van Moer (BEL)	Lotto–Soudal	+ 3h 33' 40"
101	Ivo Oliveira (POR)	UAE Team Emirates	+ 3h 38' 14"
102	Zdeněk Štybar (CZE)	Deceuninck–Quick-Step	+ 3h 43' 45"
103	Reinardt Janse van Rensburg (RSA)	NTT Pro Cycling	+ 3h 43' 49"
104	Rémy Mertz (BEL)	Lotto–Soudal	+ 3h 44' 39"
105	Logan Owen (USA)	EF Pro Cycling	+ 3h 45' 14"
106	Omer Goldstein (ISR)	Israel Start-Up Nation	+ 3h 45' 59"
107	Carlos Barbero (ESP)	NTT Pro Cycling	+ 3h 46' 30"
108	Tomasz Marczyński (POL)	Lotto–Soudal	+ 3h 48' 30"
109	Paul Martens (GER)	Team Jumbo–Visma	+ 3h 48' 59"
110	Matteo Badilatti (SUI)	Israel Start-Up Nation	+ 3h 49' 49"
111	Scott Davies (GBR)	Bahrain–McLaren	+ 3h 52' 18"
112	Max Kanter (GER)	Team Sunweb	+ 3h 53' 44"
113	Tejay Van Garderen (USA)	EF Pro Cycling	+ 3h 56' 19"
114	Juan Felipe Osorio (COL)	Burgos BH	+ 3h 56' 27"
115	Łukasz Wiśniowski (POL)	CCC Team	+ 3h 57' 14"
116	Jefferson Cepeda (ECU)	Caja Rural–Seguros RGA	+ 3h 57' 46"
117	Jon Aberasturi (ESP)	Caja Rural–Seguros RGA	+ 3h 59' 53"
118	Michał Paluta (POL)	CCC Team	+ 4h 02' 49"
119	Rui Oliveira (POR)	UAE Team Emirates	+ 4h 03' 39"
120	Enrico Gasparotto (SUI)	NTT Pro Cycling	+ 4h 05' 45"
121	Michael Mørkøv (DEN)	Deceuninck–Quick-Step	+ 4h 06' 02"
122	Michael Schwarzmann (GER)	Bora–Hansgrohe	+ 4h 06' 11"
123	Andreas Schillinger (GER)	Bora–Hansgrohe	+ 4h 06' 15"
124	Emīls Liepiņš (LVA)	Trek–Segafredo	+ 4h 07' 22"
125	James Piccoli (CAN)	Israel Start-Up Nation	+ 4h 08' 40"
126	Julius van den Berg (NED)	EF Pro Cycling	+ 4h 09' 53"
127	Ian Garrison (USA)	Deceuninck–Quick-Step	+ 4h 10' 26"
128	Alex Molenaar (NED)	Burgos BH	+ 4h 12' 35"
129	Rory Sutherland (AUS)	Israel Start-Up Nation	+ 4h 14' 17"
130	Benjamin Dyball (AUS)	NTT Pro Cycling	+ 4h 16' 20"
131	Pascal Ackermann (GER)	Bora–Hansgrohe	+ 4h 16' 49"
132	Mitchell Docker (AUS)	EF Pro Cycling	+ 4h 17' 56"
133	Lorrenzo Manzin (FRA)	Total Direct Énergie	+ 4h 19' 58"
134	Emmanuel Morin (FRA)	Cofidis	+ 4h 20' 39"
135	Alexander Edmondson (AUS)	Mitchelton–Scott	+ 4h 23' 51"
136	Niki Terpstra (NED)	Total Direct Énergie	+ 4h 36' 59"
137	Sam Bennett (IRL)	Deceuninck–Quick-Step	+ 4h 39' 06"
138	Kevin Inkelaar (NED)	Bahrain–McLaren	+ 4h 39' 48"
139	Mihkel Räim (EST)	Israel Start-Up Nation	+ 4h 46' 31"
140	Martin Laas (EST)	Bora–Hansgrohe	+ 4h 55' 40"
141	Rüdiger Selig (GER)	Bora–Hansgrohe	+ 5h 00' 37"
142	Mickaël Delage (FRA)	Groupama–FDJ	+ 5h 04' 17"

=== Points classification ===
Final points classification (1–10)
Rank	Rider	Team	Points
1	Primož Roglič (SLO)	Team Jumbo–Visma	204
2	Richard Carapaz (ECU)	Ineos Grenadiers	133
3	Dan Martin (IRL)	Israel Start-Up Nation	111
4	Hugh Carthy (GBR)	EF Pro Cycling	96
5	Guillaume Martin (FRA)	Cofidis	87
6	Pascal Ackermann (GER)	Bora–Hansgrohe	84
7	Jasper Philipsen (BEL)	UAE Team Emirates	80
8	Marc Soler (ESP)	Movistar Team	73
9	Michael Woods (CAN)	EF Pro Cycling	72
10	Enric Mas (ESP)	Movistar Team	71

=== Mountains classification ===
Final mountains classification (1–10)
Rank	Rider	Team	Points
1	Guillaume Martin (FRA)	Cofidis	99
2	Tim Wellens (BEL)	Lotto–Soudal	34
3	Richard Carapaz (ECU)	Ineos Grenadiers	30
4	David Gaudu (FRA)	Groupama–FDJ	29
5	Sepp Kuss (USA)	Team Jumbo–Visma	27
6	Primož Roglič (SLO)	Team Jumbo–Visma	24
7	Hugh Carthy (GBR)	EF Pro Cycling	21
8	Michael Woods (CAN)	EF Pro Cycling	21
9	Rui Costa (POR)	UAE Team Emirates	21
10	Dan Martin (IRL)	Israel Start-Up Nation	20

=== Young rider classification ===
Final young rider classification (1–10)
Rank	Rider	Team	Time
1	Enric Mas (ESP)	Movistar Team	72h 49' 48"
2	David Gaudu (FRA)	Groupama–FDJ	+ 4' 09"
3	Aleksandr Vlasov (RUS)	Astana	+ 6' 00"
4	Gino Mäder (SUI)	NTT Pro Cycling	+ 40' 03"
5	Georg Zimmermann (GER)	CCC Team	+ 42' 04"
6	Will Barta (USA)	CCC Team	+ 46' 28"
7	Kobe Goossens (BEL)	Lotto–Soudal	+ 59' 21"
8	Clément Champoussin (FRA)	AG2R La Mondiale	+ 1h 17' 44"
9	Robert Power (AUS)	Team Sunweb	+ 1h 30' 22"
10	Dorian Godon (FRA)	AG2R La Mondiale	+ 1h 38' 24"

=== Team classification ===
Final team classification (1–10)
Rank	Team	Time
1	(Spain) Movistar Team	218h 37' 21"
2	(Netherlands) Team Jumbo–Visma	+ 10' 23"
3	(Kazakhstan) Astana	+ 40' 09"
4	(United Arab Emirates) UAE Team Emirates	+ 1h 04' 05"
5	(Australia) Mitchelton–Scott	+ 1h 08' 33"
6	(France) Cofidis	+ 1h 44' 20"
7	(United Kingdom) Ineos Grenadiers	+ 2h 32' 28"
8	(France) Groupama–FDJ	+ 2h 44' 38"
9	(Germany) Team Sunweb	+ 3h 08' 27"
10	(United States) EF Pro Cycling	+ 3h 12' 25"
