= Juan Felipe Osorio =

Colombian cyclist

Personal information
- Full name: Juan Felipe Osorio Arboleda
- Nickname: Ebrio
- Born: 30 January 1995 (age 31) La Unión, Antioquia, Colombia
- Height: 1.80 m (5 ft 11 in)
- Weight: 65 kg (143 lb)

Cycling career
- Sport: Cycling
- Current team: Orgullo Paisa
- Discipline: Road
- Role: Rider

Amateur teams
- 2013: Indeportes Antioquia la Más Educada
- 2015: Team Manzana Postobón
- 2019: Super Giros–Alcaldía de Manizales
- 2022–2023: Equipe Continental Orgullo Paisa

Professional teams
- 2014: 4-72 Colombia
- 2016–2019: Team Manzana Postobón
- 2019: UD Oliveirense–InOutBuild
- 2020–2021: Burgos BH
- 2024–: Orgullo Paisa

Juan Felipe Osorio Arboleda (born 30 January 1995 in La Unión, Antioquia) is a Colombian cyclist, who currently rides for UCI Continental team Orgullo Paisa. He was named in the startlist for the 2017 Vuelta a España.

== Major results ==
2016
1st Stage 9 Clásico RCN
2017
1st Mountains classification Volta ao Algarve
2019
2nd Road race, National Road Championships
2020
Combativity award Stage 9 Vuelta a España
2022
10th Time trial, National Road Championships

=== Grand Tour general classification results timeline ===
Grand Tour	2017	2018	2019	2020
Giro d'Italia	—	—	—	—
Tour de France	—	—	—	—
Vuelta a España	87	—	—	114

Legend
—	Did not compete
DNF	Did not finish
