= Richard Carapaz =

Ecuadorian bicycle racer

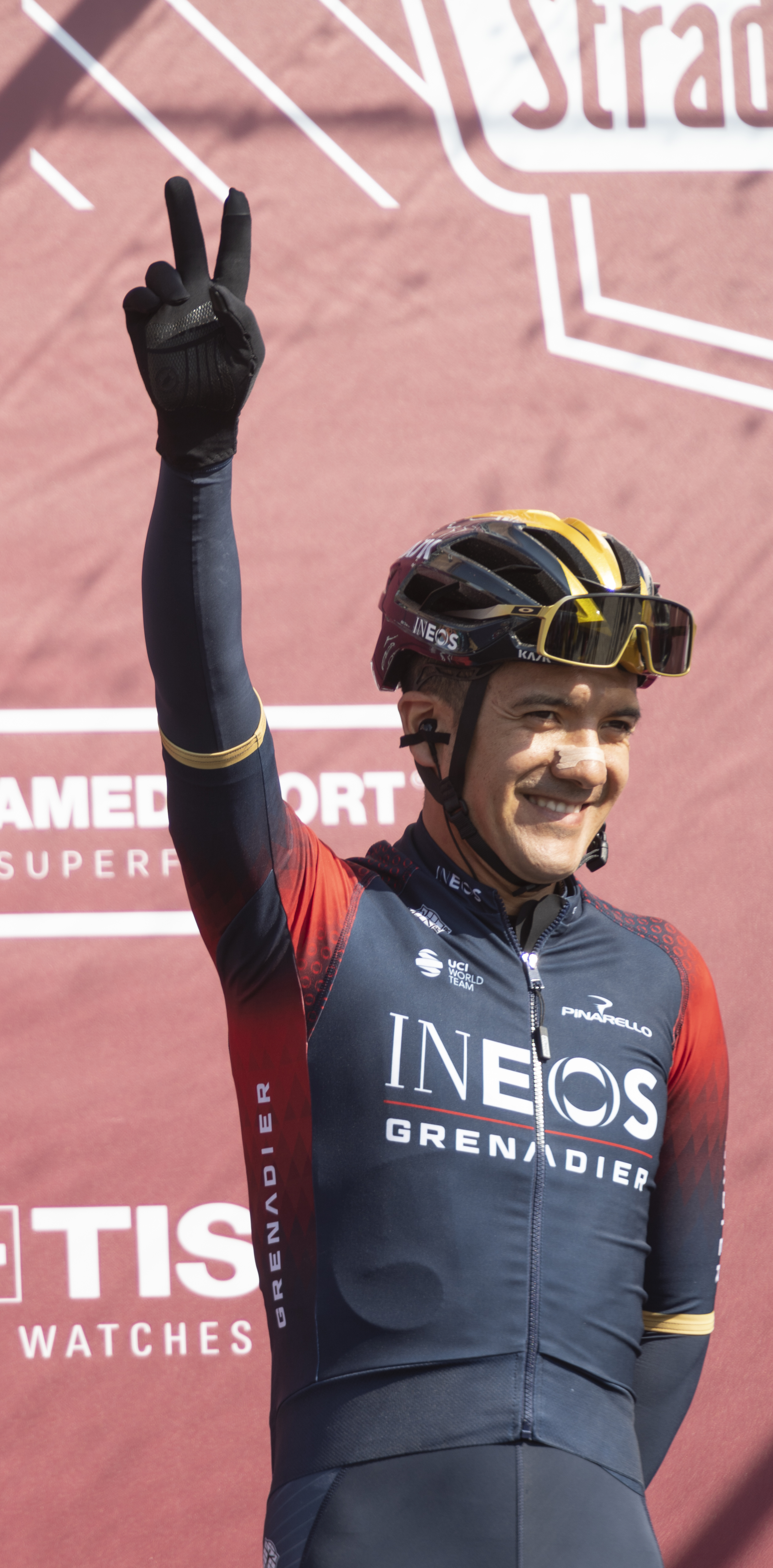
- Carapaz at the 2022 Strade Bianche

Personal information
- Full name: Richard Antonio Carapaz Montenegro
- Nicknames: La Locomotora (The Locomotive); El Jaguar de Tulcan
- Born: 29 May 1993 (age 33) Tulcán Canton, Ecuador
- Height: 1.70 m (5 ft 7 in)
- Weight: 62 kg (137 lb; 9 st 11 lb)

Cycling career
- Sport: Cycling
- Current team: EF Education–EasyPost
- Discipline: Road
- Role: Rider
- Rider type: Climbing specialist

Amateur teams
- 2011: Panavial–Coraje Carchense
- 2013: RPM Ecuador
- 2014: Panavial–GAD Carchi
- 2015: Strongman–Campagnolo
- 2016: Lizarte

Professional teams
- 2016: Strongman–Campagnolo–Wilier
- 2016: Movistar Team (stagiaire)
- 2017–2019: Movistar Team
- 2020–2022: Team INEOS
- 2023–: EF Education–EasyPost

Major wins
- Grand Tours Tour de France Mountains classification (2024, 2026) 3 individual stages (2024, 2026) Combativity award (2024, 2026) Giro d'Italia General classification (2019) 4 individual stages (2018, 2019, 2025) Vuelta a España Mountains classification (2022) 3 individual stages (2022) Stage races Tour de Suisse (2021) One-day races and Classics Olympic Games Road Race (2020) National Road Race Championships (2023) National Time Trial Championships (2022, 2024)
Medal record
Representing Ecuador
Men's road bicycle racing
Olympic Games
Gold medal – first place	2020 Tokyo	Men's road race
Pan American Games
Silver medal – second place	2023 Santiago	Time trial

Richard Antonio Carapaz Montenegro (born 29 May 1993) is an Ecuadorian professional road racing cyclist who currently rides for UCI WorldTeam EF Education–EasyPost. Carapaz is set to join NSN Cycling Team from the 2027 season onwards on a three year deal.

Carapaz won the 2019 Giro d'Italia, becoming the first Ecuadorian rider to win the race. In July 2021, he won the gold medal in the road race at the 2020 Summer Olympics, becoming the first Ecuadorian cyclist to win a medal and only the second Ecuadorian in any sport to win a gold medal at the Olympic Games. In doing so, he became the first cyclist to achieve an Olympic road race gold medal and a podium finish in each of the three Grand Tours.

== Early life ==
Carapaz was born in El Carmelo, Tulcán Canton. Whilst at school, he was mentored by one of his teachers, former Olympic racing cyclist Juan Carlos Rosero, who started a cycling club at the school. The club has also produced a number of other professional riders, including Jhonatan Narváez and Jonathan Caicedo. Prior to taking up cycling, Carapaz competed for his school as a runner.

== Career ==
=== Movistar Team (2016–2019) ===
==== 2016 ====
Carapaz began his career with amateur teams in Ecuador, Colombia and Spain. On 28 July 2016, he joined Movistar Team from Lizarte as a trainee for the remainder of the 2016 season. He signed as a professional rider ahead of the 2017 season.

==== 2017 ====
In his first full year for the Movistar Team, Carapaz came second in both the GP Industria & Artigianato and the Route du Sud. He made his Grand Tour debut in the Vuelta a España, finishing 36th overall.

==== 2018 ====
His first professional victories came in 2018, with a stage and the overall in the Vuelta a Asturias. He won stage 8 of the Giro d'Italia, becoming the first Ecuadorian cyclist to win a Grand Tour stage. He finished in the top ten in five other stages of that race, and finished fourth in the general classification. He also completed the 2018 Vuelta a España in 18th place.

==== 2019 ====
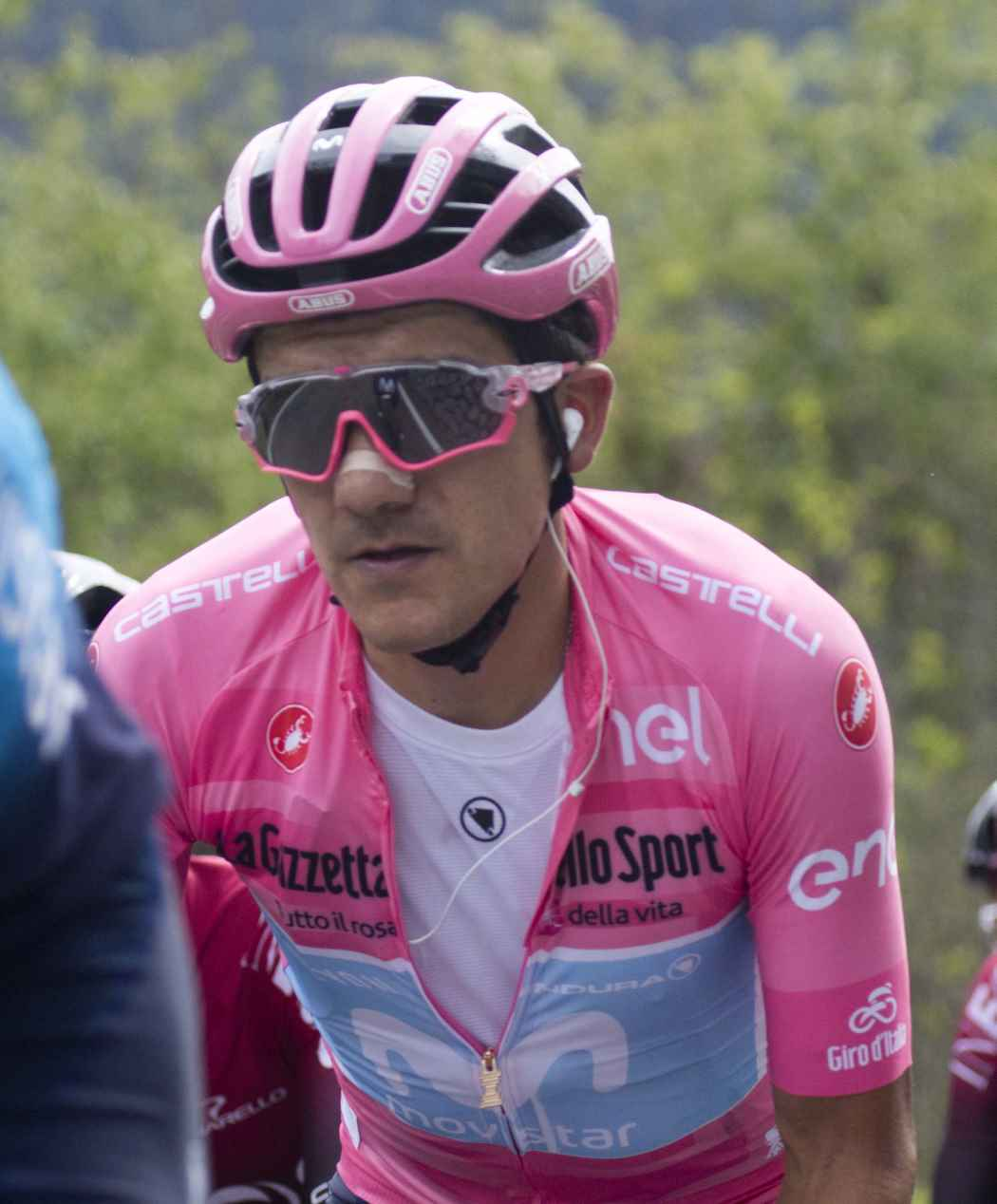
Carapaz at the 2019 Giro d'Italia wearing the Maglia Rosa

Carapaz again won the Vuelta a Asturias in 2019, and went on to win the 2019 Giro d'Italia. After multiple crashes late in stage 4 saw several riders go down and a select group break off on the front, Carapaz made an attack in the final kilometre to take the stage win. On Stage 13, Carapaz attacked and got clear of the two favourites for overall victory, Vincenzo Nibali (Bahrain–Merida) and Primož Roglič (Team Jumbo–Visma). This placed him among the other favourites, two minutes down on Roglič. On stage 14, Carapaz again attacked and won the stage by almost two minutes, taking the general classification lead. Carapaz successfully defended his lead for the rest of the race to take the overall victory. Carapaz became the first Ecuadorian rider to win a Grand Tour and the second South American rider to win the Giro, after Colombian Nairo Quintana in 2014.

=== Team Ineos (2020–2022) ===
==== 2020 ====
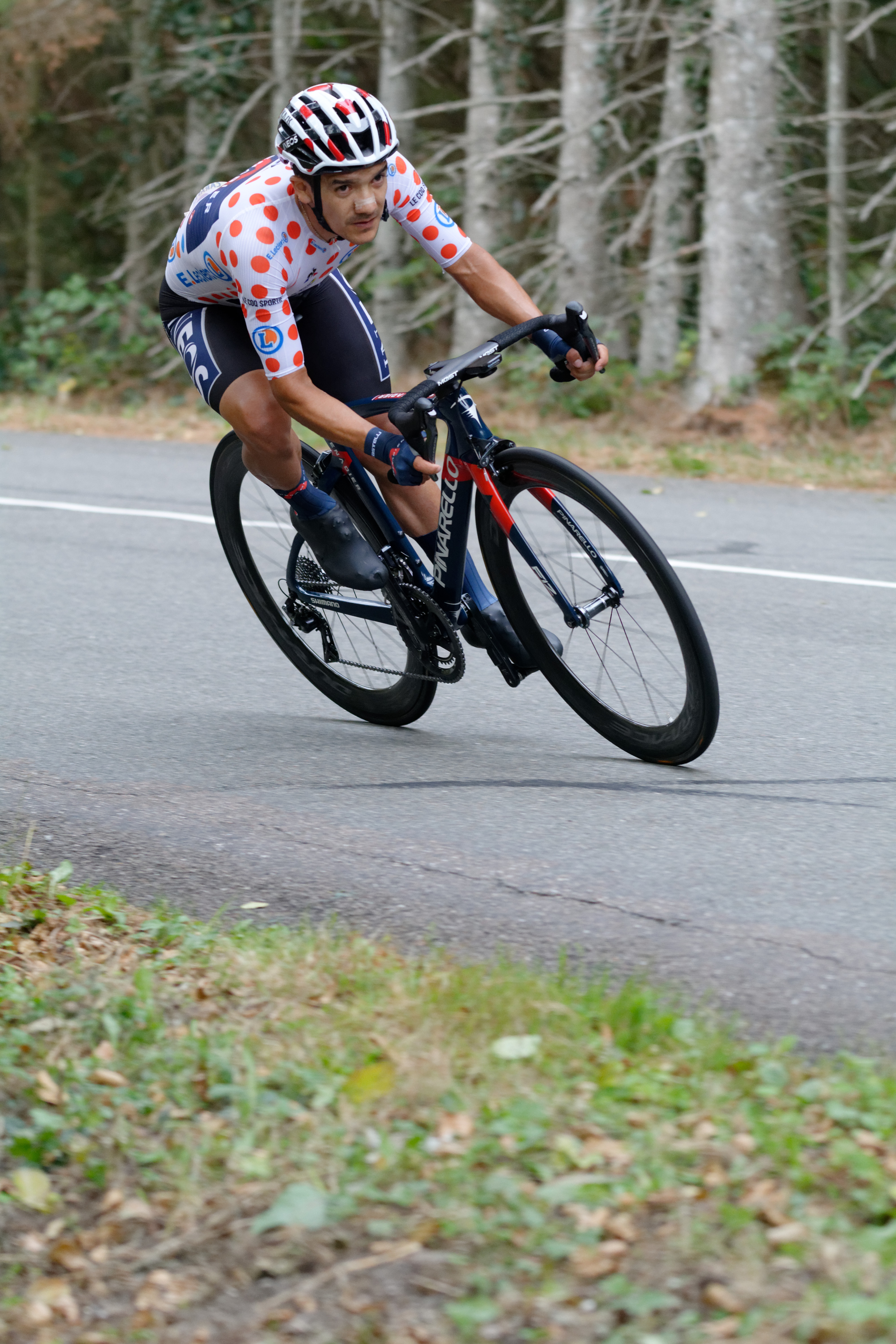
Carapaz wearing the polka dot jersey at the 2020 Tour de France

Carapaz joined Team INEOS at the beginning of the 2020 season on a three-year deal. His first win for the team came on 7 August, on the third stage of the Tour de Pologne: on the uphill drag to the finish, Carapaz made an attack in the final kilometre and held off the peloton. In the Tour de France, he came second in both stages 16 and 18. On the latter stage, he finished alongside teammate Michał Kwiatkowski, who won the stage, while Carapaz took the lead in the mountains classification from Tadej Pogačar. However, two days later, Pogačar retook the lead, and also won the stage and moved into the overall race lead; Carapaz ultimately finished second in the mountains classification.

In the Vuelta a España, Carapaz was once again a challenger for overall victory and traded places with defending champion Primož Roglič several times for the race lead. He first took the red jersey of the race leader on stage 6 from Roglič. On stage 10, Carapaz relinquished it back to Roglič, who won the day's stage, though the two were tied on time and had to be differentiated by tiebreakers. Carapaz regained the race lead briefly after stage 12, but lost it for good to Roglič after the thirteenth stage. On the mountainous penultimate stage, with Roglič, Carapaz, and Hugh Carthy locked in a three-way battle for the overall victory, Carapaz unleashed a devastating attack and dropped Roglič. With Roglič struggling behind, Movistar began to pace for him, whether an intentional bid to prevent Carapaz from winning after he left their team a year earlier, or an effort to shore up 4th place ahead of Dan Martin. This would limit the time gained from Carapaz to Roglič on the attack to only 21 seconds. Carapaz would ultimately finish just 24 seconds behind Roglič and secured a second place overall finish. This difference was settled by time bonuses, as Carapaz was actually 8 seconds ahead on pure road time.

==== 2021 ====
Carapaz took his first victory of the 2021 season on 10 June, winning the mountainous fifth stage of the Tour de Suisse. In so doing, he took the general classification lead, which he defended over the remaining five stages to take the overall win by 17 seconds ahead of Rigoberto Urán.

Carapaz was named to the INEOS Grenadiers's Tour de France squad as one of four possible contenders for the general classification alongside Tao Geoghegan Hart, Richie Porte, and Tour winner Geraint Thomas. After the other three riders were involved in crashes and lost time in the first week, Carapaz emerged as the sole leader. He would eventually finish third overall.

Carapaz won the Olympic road race, finishing over a minute clear of the rest of the field. He initially followed an attack by Brandon McNulty with 25 kilometres (16 mi) to go, but with 5.8 kilometres (3.6 mi) left, he pulled away from McNulty and rode across the finish line solo.

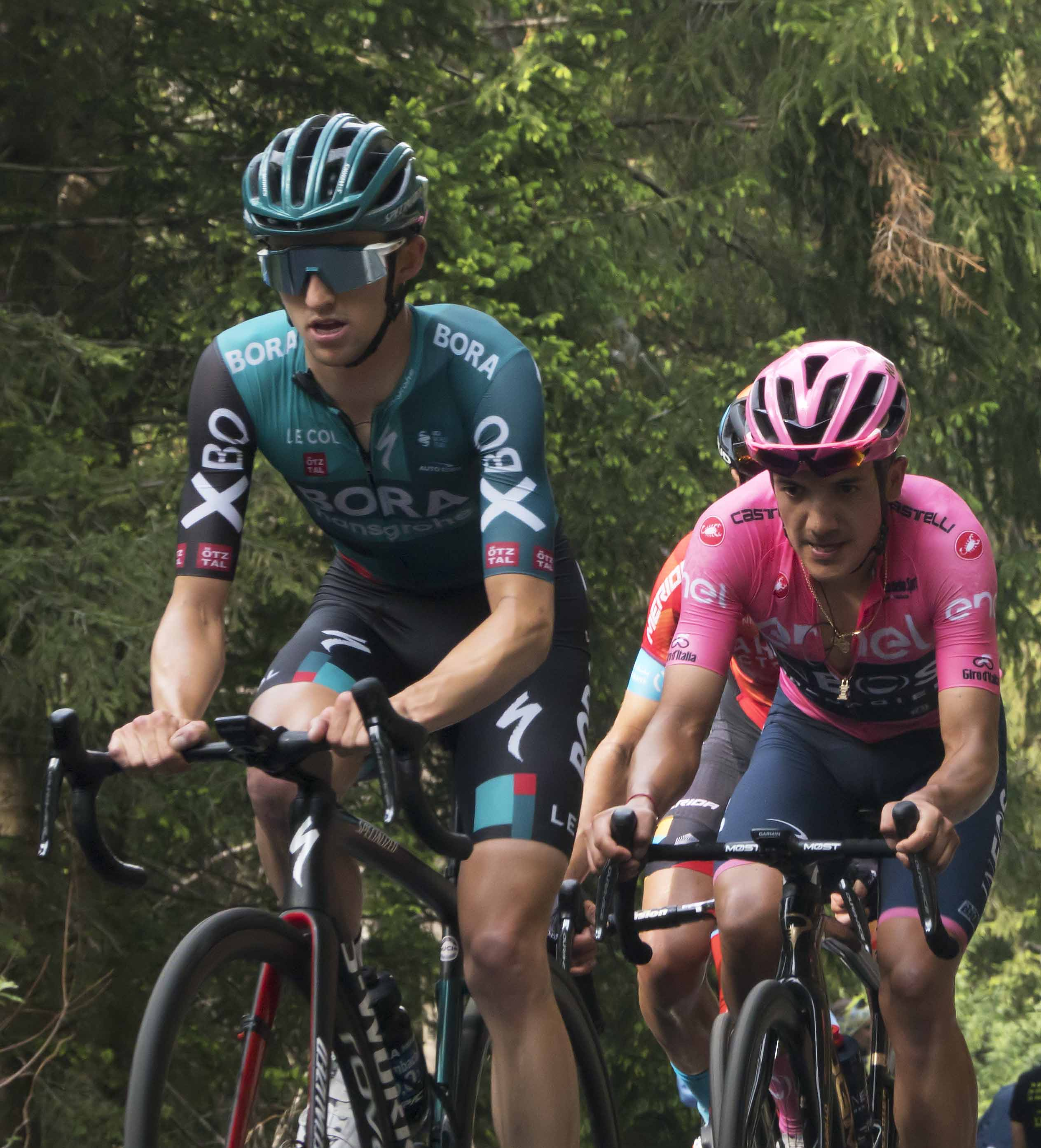
Carapaz (right) with Jai Hindley at the 2022 Giro d'Italia

==== 2022 ====
Carapaz began the 2022 season at the Étoile de Bessèges in early February, in which he crashed during stage 3 and abandoned prior to the last stage, having already lost over nine minutes to eventual winner Benjamin Thomas. His bad luck continued at the Tour de la Provence about a week later, from which he was forced to withdraw after testing positive for COVID-19 despite showing no symptoms. However, Carapaz took his first win of the season later that month at the Ecuadorian National Time Trial Championships, which was also his first national title at the elite level. His next important success came during stage 6 of the 2022 Volta a Catalunya when he went on a long-distance attack with Sergio Higuita. The pair stayed away for over 100 kilometers and raced all the way to the line with Carapaz taking the stage win and moving into 2nd on GC.

=== EF Education-EasyPost (2023–2027) ===
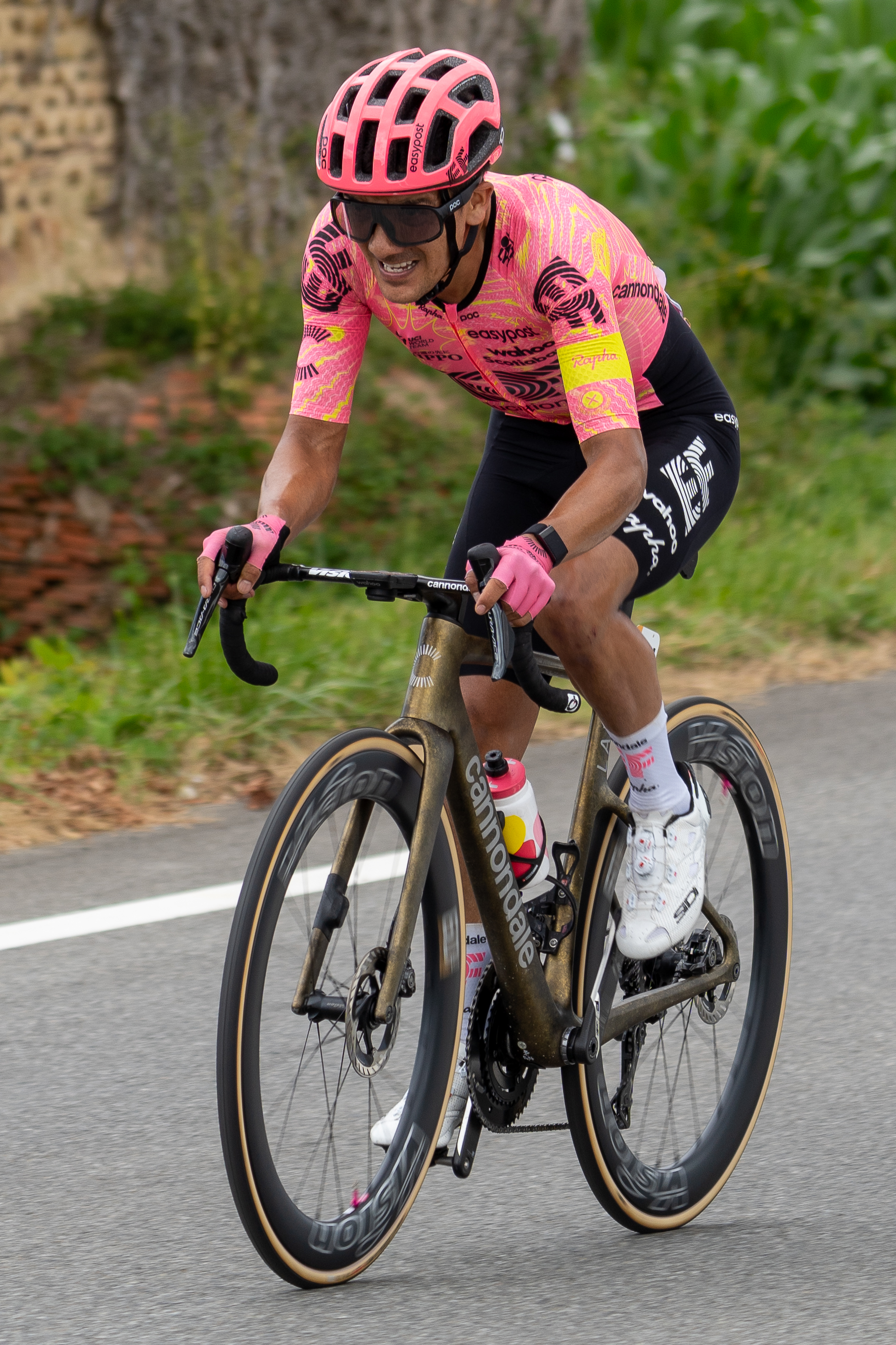
Carapaz at the 2024 Tour de France.

==== 2023 ====
On 19 August 2022 it was announced Carapaz would join EF Education–EasyPost from the 2023 season on a three-year contract.

==== 2024 ====
Despite a crash during the 2024 Tour de Suisse and subsequent illness, Carapaz entered the 2024 Tour de France with EF Education-EasyPost, aiming for stage wins. He took the yellow jersey after Stage 3, becoming the first Ecuadorian rider to do so, before losing it to Tadej Pogačar after Stage 4. He went on to win Stage 17 in a solo finish, crossing the finish line more than 7 minutes before Pogačar (27th place), who still held the jersey at the time. By winning this stage, he became the first Ecuadorian to win a Tour de France stage, and the first to win a stage at each of the Grand Tours. Carapaz took the polka–dot jersey from Pogačar after Stage 19, and by the end of Stage 20 he had secured a large enough lead in the KoM category for a win to be inevitable. This made Carapaz the first Ecuadorian to win the classification.

==== 2025 ====
Carapaz began his grand tour season at the 2025 Giro d'Italia, with the aim of winning the general classification (GC). After a quiet first week, he would go on to win stage 11 after a late solo attack. On Stage 16, being over 2 minutes down on GC rivals Isaac Del Toro and Simon Yates, Carapaz would launch a lethal attack, as he would end up closing the gap to the former in the pink jersey to just 31 seconds. On the penultimate stage, with the gap to Del Toro now 43 seconds, and Carapaz being 37 seconds ahead of Yates, Yates would launch a famous attack on the Colle delle Finestre. With both Del Toro and Carapaz expecting each other to do the work, the gap ballooned, as Del Toro would end up finishing almost 4 minutes down on the GC Classification, with Carapaz finishing 3rd, over 4 minutes behind the leader Yates. The lack of cooperation became a major talking point, with Carapaz famously saying that Del Toro "doesn't know how to race".

Due to a severe case of gastroenteritis from which he was unable to recover for some time, he announced in a post on his Instagram account that he would not be able to participate in the 2025 Tour de France. Carapaz also missed the 2025 Vuelta a España. He focused the autumn Italian classics and the World Championships in Rwanda. He came 11th in the Giro dell'Emilia.

==== 2026 ====
Carapaz did not race the 2026 Giro d'Italia due to an operation to remove a perineal cyst. He aims to prepare for the Tour de France, saying "going to the Giro like this wasn't going to be the best, so we reevaluated our goals. If we couldn't go to the Giro, we were going to do a great preparation for the Tour."

He returned to racing at the GP Gippingen, finishing third, behind Liam Slock and Aleksandr Vlasov.

Carapaz was selected for the 2026 Tour de France. He won stage eighteen from the breakaway, 45 seconds ahead of Mauro Schmid. Carapaz came third to Tadej Pogačar and Lenny Martinez on stage nineteen to Alpe d'Huez. He won the combativity prize for the stage. His work in the breakaway meant that he would wear the polka dot jersey ahead of stage twenty. Carapaz followed up his stage eighteen win with another win from the breakaway on stage twenty, which finished on the Alpe d'Huez after ascents of the Col de la Croix de Fer, Col du Télégraphe, Col du Galibier, and Col de Sarenne. He was dropped by Sepp Kuss on the Col de Sarenne, before catching him again when Kuss crashed twice in the final kilometres of the stage. Carapaz won the super combativity award, despite losing the public vote to Mads Pedersen. This meant that Carapaz would go home from the Tour having won 2 stages, the King of the Mountains jersey, the super combativity award, and having finished 8th overall, exactly 20 minutes down on Pogacar.

Carapaz was selected for the Vuelta a España, with an aim to challenge for the general classification. He finished fourth overall.

=== NSN Cycling Team (2027–) ===
In October 2026 it was announced that despite still being under contract for another year, Carapaz would be leaving EF Education-EasyPost and transferring to the NSN Cycling Team for the 2027 season on a three-year deal.

EF team manager Jonathan Vaughters shared that the move was "not forced" by Carapaz, but instead the team had reluctantly decided to let Carapaz go due to economic difficulties at EF and a need to cut the rider salary budget.

== Personal life ==
Carapaz's mother passed away in early 2026.

== Major results ==
2010
1st Road race, National Junior Road Championships
2013
1st Road race, Pan American Under-23 Road Championships
2nd Overall Vuelta al Ecuador
9th Overall Tour de Savoie Mont-Blanc
9th Overall Vuelta a Guatemala
2014
2nd Overall Vuelta al Ecuador
2015
1st Overall Vuelta de la Juventud de Colombia

1st Stages 3 & 4

1st Stage 4 Clásico RCN
2016
1st Overall Vuelta a Navarra

1st Stage 2

2017
2nd Overall Route du Sud

1st Young rider classification

2nd GP Industria & Artigianato di Larciano
4th Overall Vuelta a Castilla y León
6th Overall Vuelta a la Comunidad de Madrid
2018 (3 pro wins)
1st Overall Vuelta a Asturias

1st Stage 2

3rd Overall Settimana Internazionale di Coppi e Bartali
4th Overall Giro d'Italia

1st Stage 8
Held after Stages 6–13

5th Circuito de Getxo
2019 (5)
1st Overall Giro d'Italia

1st Stages 4 & 14

1st Overall Vuelta a Asturias

1st Points classification
1st Stage 2

3rd Overall Vuelta a Burgos
6th Overall Vuelta a San Juan
9th Overall Tour Colombia
2020 (1)
1st Stage 3 Tour de Pologne
2nd Overall Vuelta a España

Held after Stages 6–9 & 12
Held after Stages 2–4

6th Overall Vuelta a Burgos
Tour de France

Held after Stages 18–19
Combativity award Stage 16

2021 (3)
1st Road race, Olympic Games
1st Overall Tour de Suisse

1st Stage 5

3rd Overall Tour de France
9th La Flèche Wallonne
2022 (5)
National Road Championships

1st Time trial
2nd Road race

Vuelta a España

1st Mountains classification
1st Stages 12, 14 & 20

2nd Overall Giro d'Italia

Held after Stages 14–19
Combativity award Stage 14

2nd Overall Volta a Catalunya

1st Stage 6

2023 (2)
1st Road race, National Road Championships
1st Mercan'Tour Classic
Pan American Games

2nd Time trial
7th Road race

2nd Tre Valli Varesine
2nd Giro della Toscana
7th Giro dell'Emilia
7th Coppa Sabatini
8th Giro di Lombardia
2024 (4)
National Road Championships

1st Time trial
2nd Road race

Tour de France

1st Mountains classification
1st Stage 17
Held after Stage 3
Combativity award Stage 15, 19 & Overall

2nd Overall Tour Colombia

1st Points classification
1st Mountains classification
1st Stage 5

4th Overall Vuelta a España
7th Overall Tour de Romandie

1st Stage 4

2025 (1)
3rd Overall Giro d'Italia

1st Stage 11

3rd Overall Tour de Luxembourg
7th Coppa Sabatini
9th Overall Tour des Alpes-Maritimes
9th Giro della Toscana
10th Overall Volta a Catalunya
2026 (2)
2nd Overall Tour de Suisse
2nd Clásica de San Sebastián
4th Overall Vuelta a España
8th Overall Tour de France

1st Mountains classification
1st Stages 18 & 20
Combativity award Stages 10, 14, 18, 19 & Overall

10th Overall Volta a Catalunya

=== General classification results timeline ===
Grand Tour general classification results
Grand Tour	2017	2018	2019	2020	2021	2022	2023	2024	2025	2026
Giro d'Italia	—	4	1	—	—	2	—	—	3	—
Tour de France	—	—	—	13	3	—	DNF	17	—	8
Vuelta a España	36	18	—	2	DNF	14	—	4	—	4
Major stage race general classification results
Major stage race	2017	2018	2019	2020	2021	2022	2023	2024	2025	2026
Paris–Nice	—	11	—	—	—	—	—	—	—	—
Tirreno–Adriatico	—	—	20	—	—	DNF	—	DNF	18	18
Volta a Catalunya	—	—	26	NH	21	2	51	—	10	10
Tour of the Basque Country	—	—	—	NH	—	—	DNF	—	—	—
Tour de Romandie	38	—	—	NH	—	—	—	7	—	—
Critérium du Dauphiné	44	—	—	—	—	—	36	—	—	—
Tour de Suisse	—	—	—	NH	1	—	—	DNF	—	2

=== Major championships timeline ===
Event		2018	2019	2020	2021	2022	2023	2024	2025
Olympic Games	Road race	Not held			1	Not held		—	NH
Olympic Games	Time trial	Not held			—	Not held		—	NH
World Championships	Road race	71	DNF	22	—	—	—	—	
World Championships	Time trial	—	—	—	—	—	—	—	—
National Championships	Road race	—	—	—	—	2	1	2	—
National Championships	Time trial	—	—	—	—	1	—	1	—

Legend
—	Did not compete
DNF	Did not finish
IP	In progress
NH	Not held
