= Hugh Carthy =

British cyclist

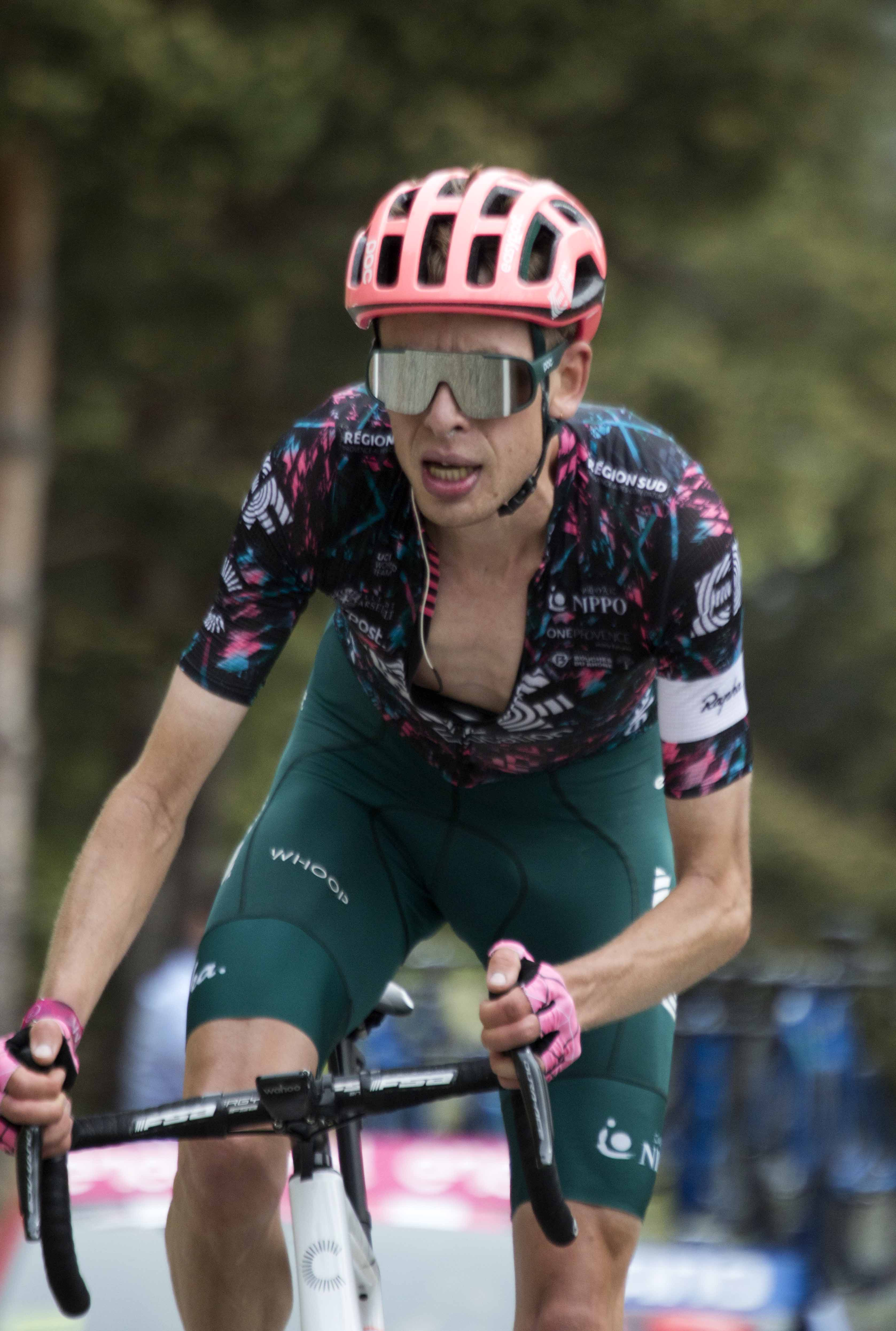
- Carthy at the 2022 Giro d'Italia

Personal information
- Full name: Hugh John Carthy
- Nickname: Huge
- Born: 9 July 1994 (age 32) Preston, England, United Kingdom
- Height: 1.93 m (6 ft 4 in)
- Weight: 69 kg (152 lb; 10.9 st)

Cycling career
- Sport: Cycling
- Current team: Retired
- Discipline: Road
- Role: Rider
- Rider type: Climber

Professional teams
- 2013–2014: Rapha Condor–JLT
- 2015–2016: Caja Rural–Seguros RGA
- 2017–2025: Cannondale–Drapac

Major wins
- Grand Tours Vuelta a España 1 individual stage (2020)

Hugh John Carthy (born 9 July 1994) is a British former professional road racing cyclist. Carthy's nickname "Huge" was coined when his name was mispronounced by an announcer in the Giro d'Italia, but stuck due to his ability to produce huge efforts and dig deep.

== Early life ==
Carthy grew up in Preston. He attended Our Lady's Catholic High School.

== Career ==
In 2014 he won the Tour de Korea stage race, and in 2015, he joined the Spanish team Caja Rural–Seguros RGA.

He was named in the start list for the 2016 Vuelta a España and the start list for the 2017 Giro d'Italia.

Carthy crashed out on stage 6 of the 2019 Vuelta a España, being one of four riders to abandon due to the crash.

In August 2020, he was named in the startlist for the 2020 Tour de France. On 1 November 2020, Carthy notched his first grand tour stage win on the 2020 Vuelta a España's stage 12, which featured a summit finish on the Alto de l'Angliru. His time climbing the Angliru was among the all-time top 10 and no one had ridden the climb faster since Chris Horner won the Vuelta there in 2013. He went on to finish third overall, his first podium in a grand tour.

== Major results ==
2012
1st Overall Junior Tour of Wales

1st Mountains classification
1st Stage 2

2014 (2 pro wins)
1st Overall Tour de Korea

1st Young rider classification
1st Stage 7

6th Overall Tour of Japan

1st Mountains classification
1st Young rider classification

6th Overall Mzansi Tour

1st Prologue (TTT)

2015
9th Overall Tour du Gévaudan Languedoc-Roussillon

1st Young rider classification

9th Overall USA Pro Cycling Challenge
2016 (2)
1st Overall Vuelta a Asturias

1st Young rider classification
1st Stage 1

6th Prueba Villafranca de Ordizia
8th Giro dell'Appennino
8th GP Miguel Induráin
9th Overall Volta a Catalunya

1st Young rider classification

9th Overall Vuelta a la Comunidad de Madrid
2018
3rd Overall Colorado Classic

1st Mountains classification

5th Overall Tour of Utah
2019 (1)
Tour de Suisse

1st Mountains classification
1st Stage 9

3rd Overall Tour du Haut Var
Giro d'Italia

Held after Stage 12

2020 (1)
3rd Overall Vuelta a España

1st Stage 12

4th Overall Tour de la Provence
2021 (1)
1st Stage 5 Vuelta a Burgos
3rd Classic Sud-Ardèche
5th Overall Tour of the Alps
8th Overall Giro d'Italia
8th Overall Volta a Catalunya
2022
2nd Overall Tour de Langkawi
9th Overall Giro d'Italia
9th Overall Tour of the Alps
2023
2nd Overall Tour of the Alps
4th Overall Tour of Guangxi
6th Trofeo Serra de Tramuntana
8th Overall Tirreno–Adriatico
2024
6th Overall O Gran Camiño

=== General classification results timeline ===
Grand Tour general classification results
Grand Tour	2015	2016	2017	2018	2019	2020	2021	2022	2023	2024	2025
Giro d'Italia	—	—	92	77	11	—	8	9	DNF	—	—
Tour de France	—	—	—	—	—	37	—	—	—	—	—
Vuelta a España	—	125	—	—	DNF	3	DNF	25	23	—	—
Major stage race general classification results
Race	2015	2016	2017	2018	2019	2020	2021	2022	2023	2024	2025
Paris–Nice	Did not contest during his career										
Tirreno–Adriatico	—	—	—	—	—	—	—	—	8	—	—
Volta a Catalunya	—	9	20	13	DNF	NH	8	27	—	84	DNF
Tour of the Basque Country	85	—	—	DNF	12	NH	12	—	—	—	DNF
Tour de Romandie	—	—	—	47	28	NH	—	—	—	—	71
Critérium du Dauphiné	Did not contest during his career										
Tour de Suisse	—	—	56	18	27	NH	—	DNF	—	—	—

Legend
—	Did not compete
DNF	Did not finish
