= 2024 Visma–Lease a Bike (men's team) season =

Visma–Lease a Bike
- 2024 season
- UCI code: TVL
- Status: UCI WorldTeam
- Manager: Richard Plugge (NED)
- Main sponsor(s): Visma; Lease a Bike
- Based: Netherlands
- Bicycles: Cervélo
- Groupset: SRAM

Season victories
- One-day races: 6
- Stage race overall: 6
- Stage race stages: 19
- National Championships: 1
- Most wins: (Denmark) Jonas Vingegaard (9)

The 2024 season for Visma–Lease a Bike is the team's 41st season overall and the first season under the current name. The team has been a UCI WorldTeam since 2005, when the tier was first established.

== Team roster ==
As of 13 January 2024.

Rider	Date of birth
Edoardo Affini (ITA)	24 June 1996 (aged 27)
Tiesj Benoot (BEL)	11 March 1994 (aged 29)
Koen Bouwman (NED)	2 December 1993 (aged 30)
Robert Gesink (NED)	31 May 1986 (aged 37)
Thomas Gloag (GBR)	13 September 2001 (aged 22)
Per Strand Hagenes (NOR)	10 July 2003 (aged 20)
Michel Hessmann (GER)	6 April 2001 (aged 22)
Matteo Jorgenson (USA)	1 July 1999 (aged 24)
Wilco Kelderman (NED)	25 March 1991 (aged 32)
Olav Kooij (NED)	17 October 2001 (aged 22)
Steven Kruijswijk (NED)	7 June 1987 (aged 36)
Sepp Kuss (USA)	13 September 1994 (aged 29)
Christophe Laporte (FRA)	11 December 1992 (aged 31)
Bart Lemmen (NED)	14 October 1995 (aged 28)

Rider	Date of birth
Johannes Staune-Mittet (NOR)	18 January 2002 (aged 21)
Jan Tratnik (SLO)	23 February 1990 (aged 33)
Ben Tulett (GBR)	26 August 2001 (aged 22)
Cian Uijtdebroeks (BEL)	28 February 2003 (aged 20)
Milan Vader (NED)	18 February 1996 (aged 27)
Attila Valter (HUN)	12 June 1998 (aged 25)
Wout van Aert (BEL)	15 September 1994 (aged 29)
Dylan van Baarle (NED)	21 May 1992 (aged 31)
Loe van Belle (NED)	24 January 2002 (aged 21)
Tosh Van der Sande (BEL)	28 November 1990 (aged 33)
Mick van Dijke (NED)	15 March 2000 (aged 23)
Tim van Dijke (NED)	15 March 2000 (aged 23)
Julien Vermote (BEL)	26 July 1989 (aged 34)
Jonas Vingegaard (DEN)	10 December 1996 (aged 27)

== Season victories ==
Date	Race	Competition	Rider	Country	Location	Ref.
11 February	Clásica de Almería	UCI ProSeries	Olav Kooij (NED)	Spain	Roquetas de Mar	
16 February	Volta ao Algarve, stage 3	UCI ProSeries	Wout van Aert (BEL)	Portugal	Tavira	
23 February	UAE Tour, stage 5	UCI World Tour	Olav Kooij (NED)	United Arab Emirates	Umm Al Quwain	
23 February	O Gran Camiño, stage 2	UCI Europe Tour	Jonas Vingegaard (DEN)	Spain	Chantada	
24 February	Omloop Het Nieuwsblad	UCI World Tour	Jan Tratnik (SLO)	Belgium	Ninove	
24 February	O Gran Camiño, stage 3	UCI Europe Tour	Jonas Vingegaard (DEN)	Spain	Ribadavia	
25 February	O Gran Camiño, stage 4	UCI Europe Tour	Jonas Vingegaard (DEN)	Spain	Monte Aloia	
25 February	O Gran Camiño, overall	UCI Europe Tour	Jonas Vingegaard (DEN)	Spain		
25 February	Kuurne–Brussels–Kuurne	UCI ProSeries	Wout van Aert (BEL)	Belgium	Kuurne	
3 March	Paris–Nice, stage 1	UCI World Tour	Olav Kooij (NED)	France	Les Mureaux	
7 March	Paris–Nice, stage 5	UCI World Tour	Olav Kooij (NED)	France	Sisteron	
8 March	Tirreno–Adriatico, stage 5	UCI World Tour	Jonas Vingegaard (DEN)	Italy	Valle Castellana	
9 March	Tirreno–Adriatico, stage 6	UCI World Tour	Jonas Vingegaard (DEN)	Italy	Cagli	
10 March	Paris–Nice, overall	UCI World Tour	Matteo Jorgenson (USA)	France		
10 March	Tirreno–Adriatico, overall	UCI World Tour	Jonas Vingegaard (DEN)	Italy		
21 March	Settimana Internazionale di Coppi e Bartali, stage 3	UCI Europe Tour	Koen Bouwman (NED)	Italy	Riccione	
23 March	Settimana Internazionale di Coppi e Bartali, overall	UCI Europe Tour	Koen Bouwman (NED)	Italy		
27 March	Dwars door Vlaanderen	UCI World Tour	Matteo Jorgenson (USA)	Belgium	Waregem	
12 May	Giro d'Italia, stage 9	UCI World Tour	Olav Kooij (NED)	Italy	Naples	
10 July	Tour de France, stage 11	UCI World Tour	Jonas Vingegaard (DEN)	France	Le Lioran	
27 July	Czech Tour, stage 3	UCI Europe Tour	Thomas Gloag (UK)	Czech Republic	Dlouhé stráně	
7 August	Vuelta a Burgos, stage 3	UCI ProSeries	Sepp Kuss (USA)	Spain	Lagunas de Neila	
9 August	Vuelta a Burgos, overall	UCI ProSeries	Sepp Kuss (USA)	Spain		
15 August	Tour de Pologne, stage 4	UCI World Tour	Olav Kooij (NED)	Poland	Prudnik	
18 August	Tour de Pologne, stage 7	UCI World Tour	Olav Kooij (NED)	Poland	Kraków	
18 August	Tour de Pologne, overall	UCI World Tour	Jonas Vingegaard (DEN)	Poland		
19 August	Vuelta a España, stage 3	UCI World Tour	Wout van Aert (BEL)	Portugal	Castelo Branco	
23 August	Vuelta a España, stage 7	UCI World Tour	Wout van Aert (BEL)	Spain	Córdoba	
27 August	Vuelta a España, stage 10	UCI World Tour	Wout van Aert (BEL)	Spain	Baiona	
8 September	Hamburg Cyclassics	UCI World Tour	Olav Kooij (NED)	Germany	Hamburg	
6 October	Paris–Tours	UCI ProSeries	Christophe Laporte (FRA)	France	Tours	

== National, Continental, and World Champions ==
Date	Discipline	Jersey	Rider	Country	Location	Ref.
23 June	Hungarian National Road Race Championships		Attila Valter (HUN)	Hungary	Pannonhalma	
11 September	European Continental Time Trial Championships		Edoardo Affini (ITA)	Belgium	Hasselt	
