= 2024 Lidl–Trek (men's team) season =

Lidl–Trek
- 2024 season
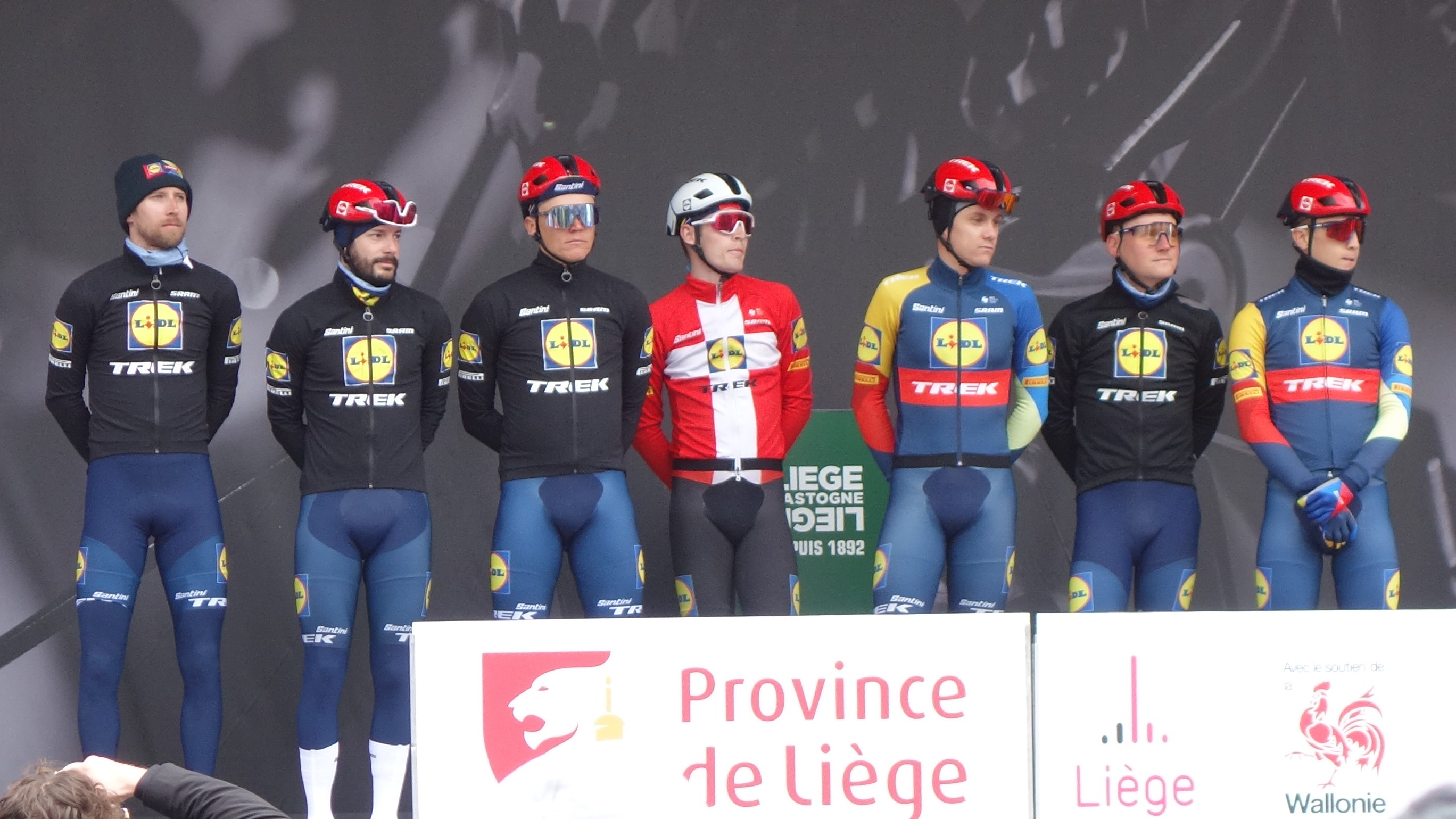
- UCI code: LTK
- Status: UCI WorldTeam
- Manager: Luca Guercilena (ITA)
- Main sponsor(s): Lidl; Trek
- Based: United States
- Bicycles: Trek
- Groupset: SRAM

Season victories
- One-day races: 1
- Stage race overall: 5
- Stage race stages: 29
- National Championships: 7
- Most wins: (Denmark) Mads Pedersen (12)

The 2024 season for the Lidl–Trek is the 14th season in the team's existence, all of them as a UCI WorldTeam.

== Team roster ==
As of January 30, 2024.

Rider	Date of birth
Andrea Bagioli (ITA)	March 23, 1999 (aged 24)
Julien Bernard (FRA)	March 17, 1992 (aged 31)
Simone Consonni (ITA)	September 12, 1994 (aged 29)
Dario Cataldo (ITA)	March 17, 1985 (aged 38)
Giulio Ciccone (ITA)	December 20, 1994 (aged 29)
Tim Declercq (BEL)	March 29, 1989 (aged 34)
Fabio Felline (ITA)	March 29, 1990 (aged 33)
Tao Geoghegan Hart (GBR)	March 30, 1995 (aged 28)
Amanuel Ghebreigzabhier (ERI)	August 17, 1994 (aged 29)
Ryan Gibbons (RSA)	August 13, 1994 (aged 29)
Daan Hoole (NED)	February 22, 1999 (aged 24)
Alex Kirsch (LUX)	June 12, 1992 (aged 31)
Patrick Konrad (AUT)	October 23, 1991 (aged 32)
Juan Pedro López (ESP)	July 31, 1997 (aged 26)
Jonathan Milan (ITA)	October 1, 2000 (aged 23)

Rider	Date of birth
Bauke Mollema (NED)	November 26, 1986 (aged 37)
Jacopo Mosca (ITA)	August 29, 1993 (aged 30)
Thibau Nys (BEL)	November 12, 2002 (aged 21)
Sam Oomen (NED)	August 15, 1995 (aged 28)
Mads Pedersen (DEN)	December 18, 1995 (aged 28)
Quinn Simmons (USA)	May 8, 2001 (aged 22)
Mattias Skjelmose (DEN)	September 26, 2000 (aged 23)
Toms Skujiņš (LAT)	June 15, 1991 (aged 32)
Jasper Stuyven (BEL)	April 17, 1992 (aged 31)
Natnael Tesfatsion (ERI)	May 23, 1999 (aged 24)
Edward Theuns (BEL)	April 30, 1991 (aged 32)
Mathias Vacek (CZE)	June 12, 2002 (aged 21)
Otto Vergaerde (BEL)	July 15, 1994 (aged 29)
Carlos Verona (ESP)	November 4, 1992 (aged 31)

== Season victories ==
Date	Race	Competition	Rider	Country	Location	Ref.
2 February	Étoile de Bessèges, stage 3	UCI Europe Tour	Mads Pedersen (DEN)	France	Bessèges	
2 February	Volta a la Comunitat Valenciana, stage 3	UCI ProSeries	Jonathan Milan (ITA)	Spain	Orihuela	
4 February	Étoile de Bessèges, overall	UCI Europe Tour	Mads Pedersen (DEN)	France		
8 February	Tour de la Provence, prologue	UCI Europe Tour	Mads Pedersen (DEN)	France	Marseille	
9 February	Tour de la Provence, stage 1	UCI Europe Tour	Mads Pedersen (DEN)	France	Martigues	
10 February	Tour de la Provence, stage 2	UCI Europe Tour	Mads Pedersen (DEN)	France	Manosque	
11 February	Tour de la Provence, overall	UCI Europe Tour	Mads Pedersen (DEN)	France		
7 March	Tirreno–Adriatico, stage 4	UCI World Tour	Jonathan Milan (ITA)	Italy	Giulianova	
8 March	Paris–Nice, stage 6	UCI World Tour	Mattias Skjelmose (DEN)	France	La Colle-sur-Loup	
10 March	Tirreno–Adriatico, stage 7	UCI World Tour	Jonathan Milan (ITA)	Italy	San Benedetto	
24 March	Gent–Wevelgem	UCI World Tour	Mads Pedersen (DEN)	Belgium	Wevelgem	
17 April	Tour of the Alps, stage 3	UCI ProSeries	Juan Pedro López (ESP)	Austria	Schwaz	
19 April	Tour of the Alps, overall	UCI ProSeries	Juan Pedro López (ESP)	Austria/Italy		
25 April	Tour de Romandie, stage 2	UCI World Tour	Thibau Nys (BEL)	Switzerland	Les Marécottes	
7 May	Giro d'Italia, stage 4	UCI World Tour	Jonathan Milan (ITA)	Italy	Andora	
10 May	Tour de Hongrie, stage 3	UCI ProSeries	Thibau Nys (BEL)	Hungary	Gyöngyös	
11 May	Tour de Hongrie, stage 4	UCI ProSeries	Thibau Nys (BEL)	Hungary	Etyek	
12 May	Tour de Hongrie, overall	UCI ProSeries	Thibau Nys (BEL)	Hungary		
15 May	Giro d'Italia, stage 11	UCI World Tour	Jonathan Milan (ITA)	Italy	Francavilla al Mare	
17 May	Giro d'Italia, stage 13	UCI World Tour	Jonathan Milan (ITA)	Italy	Cento	
23 May	Tour of Norway, stage 1	UCI ProSeries	Thibau Nys (BEL)	Norway	Voss	
2 June	Critérium du Dauphiné, stage 1	UCI World Tour	Mads Pedersen (DEN)	France	Saint-Pourçain-sur-Sioule	
11 June	Tour de Suisse, stage 3	UCI World Tour	Thibau Nys (BEL)	Switzerland	Rüschlikon	
12 August	Tour de Pologne, stage 1	UCI World Tour	Thibau Nys (BEL)	Poland	Karpacz	
14 August	Tour de Pologne, stage 3	UCI World Tour	Thibau Nys (BEL)	Poland	Duszniki-Zdrój	
17 August	Tour de Pologne, stage 6	UCI World Tour	Thibau Nys (BEL)	Poland	Bukovina Resort	
21 August	Deutschland Tour, prologue	UCI ProSeries	Jonathan Milan (ITA)	Germany	Schweinfurt	
22 August	Deutschland Tour, stage 1	UCI ProSeries	Jonathan Milan (ITA)	Germany	Heilbronn	
23 August	Deutschland Tour, stage 2	UCI ProSeries	Mads Pedersen (DEN)	Germany	Schwäbisch Gmünd	
24 August	Deutschland Tour, stage 3	UCI ProSeries	Jonathan Milan (ITA)	Germany	Villingen-Schwenningen	
25 August	Deutschland Tour, stage 4	UCI ProSeries	Mads Pedersen (DEN)	Germany	Saarbrücken	
25 August	Deutschland Tour, overall	UCI ProSeries	Mads Pedersen (DEN)	Germany		
28 August	Renewi Tour, stage 1	UCI World Tour	Jonathan Milan (ITA)	Belgium	Bilzen	
30 August	Renewi Tour, stage 3	UCI World Tour	Jonathan Milan (ITA)	Belgium	Ardooie	
19 September	Tour de Luxembourg, stage 2	UCI ProSeries	Mads Pedersen (DEN)	Luxembourg	Schifflange	

== National, Continental, and World Champions ==
Date	Discipline	Jersey	Rider	Country	Location	Ref.
2 February	South African National Time Trial Championships		Ryan Gibbons (RSA)	South Africa	Midvaal	
4 February	South African National Road Race Championships		Ryan Gibbons (RSA)	South Africa	Midvaal	
13 June	Eritrean National Time Trial Championships		Amanuel Ghebreigzabhier (ERI)	Eritrea		
15 June	Eritrean National Road Race Championships		Natnael Tesfatsion (ERI)	Eritrea	Asmara	
19 June	Dutch National Time Trial Championships		Daan Hoole (NED)	Netherlands	Steenbergen	
20 June	Czech National Time Trial Championships		Mathias Vacek (CZE)	Czech Republic	Jevíčko	
20 June	Danish National Time Trial Championships		Mattias Skjelmose (DEN)	Denmark	Herning	
