= Matteo Jorgenson =

American cyclist (born 1999)

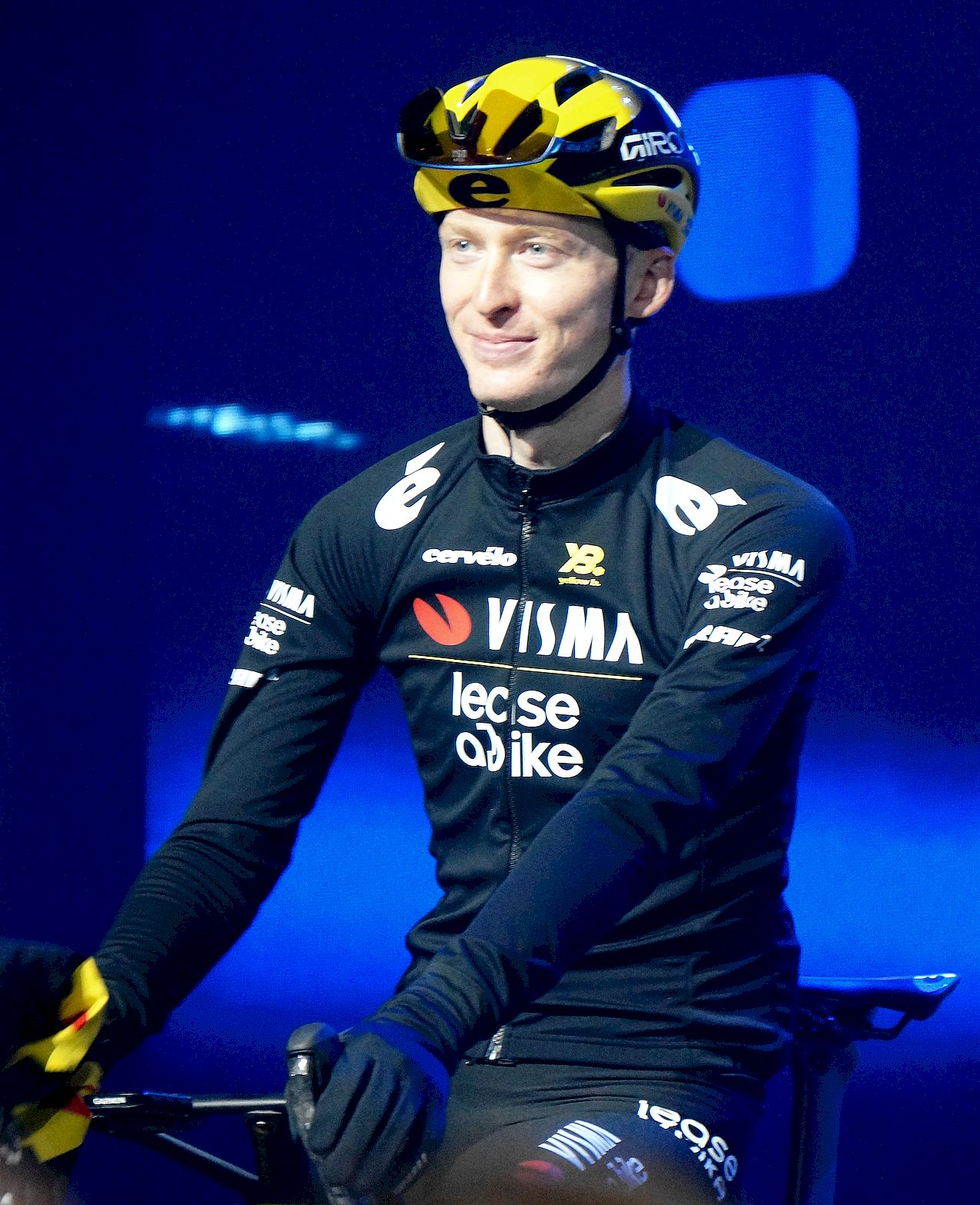
- Jorgenson at the 2025 Omloop Het Nieuwsblad

Personal information
- Nicknames: The Boise Byrd; Potato Jorgenson
- Born: July 1, 1999 (age 27) Walnut Creek, California, U.S.
- Height: 6 ft 3 in (1.90 m)
- Weight: 150 lb (70 kg)

Cycling career
- Sport: Cycling
- Current team: Visma–Lease a Bike
- Discipline: Road
- Role: Rider
- Rider type: All Rounder; Classics specialist

Amateur teams
- 2016: Boise Young Rider Development Squad
- 2016–2017: Hot Tubes Cycling
- 2019: Chambéry Cyclisme Formation

Professional teams
- 2018: Jelly Belly–Maxxis
- 2019: AG2R La Mondiale (stagiaire)
- 2020–2023: Movistar Team
- 2024–: Visma–Lease a Bike

Major wins
- Grand Tours Tour de France 1 TTT stage (2026) Stage races Paris–Nice (2024, 2025) Tour of Oman (2023) One-day races and Classics Dwars door Vlaanderen (2024)

Matteo Jorgenson (/ˈdʒɔːrɡɪnsən/ JOR-ghin-sən; born July 1, 1999) is an American professional cyclist who currently rides for UCI WorldTeam Visma–Lease a Bike. Known for his prowess in the mountains, he is a two-time winner of Paris–Nice.

Jorgenson was born in Walnut Creek, California, grew up in Boise, Idaho and credits BYRDS (Boise Young Rider Development Squad) for his start in cycling.

== Cycling career ==
Jorgenson had an active 2022 Tour de France and was involved in several breakaways including on stages 10 and 16. Late in stage 16, he was trying to chase down the lead rider Hugo Houle when he crashed while rounding a sharp corner. Despite the crash, he was still able to finish fourth on the stage.

In the 2023 Tour de France, Jorgenson was involved in a 14-man breakaway on stage 9. With around 47 km remaining of the stage, he went clear from the group, leading the stage for most of the climb up the Puy de Dôme. However, within the final 500 metres, he was passed by Michael Woods and others, ultimately finishing fourth. He had to abandon the Tour a few days later, due to injuries suffered during a crash.

Jorgenson won the 2024 Paris–Nice, becoming the first American to win the race since Floyd Landis in 2006. His win was in significant part due to him being in a three-man breakaway on Stage 6, where they finished more than 50 seconds ahead of most of the race favorites.

Jorgenson signed for Team Jumbo-Visma in 2023, for three years.

Jorgenson placed second in the 2024 Criterium du Dauphine. He started the final stage over a minute behind Primož Roglič and attacked on the final climb. With Roglič unable to hold his wheel, Jorgenson and Carlos Rodríguez gained 56 seconds on the leader. With time bonuses, Jorgenson finished the race 8 seconds behind Roglič. Jorgenson also rode in the 2024 Tour de France, in which he finished 8th in the general classification.

Jorgenson extended his contract with Visma-Lease a Bike in 2025, staying with the team until at least 2029.

== Personal life ==
Jorgenson speaks French and Spanish, alongside his native English. He lives in Nice.

== Major results ==
2017
5th Overall Tour de l'Abitibi
5th Overall Grand Prix Rüebliland
2018
2nd Road race, National Under-23 Road Championships
8th Chrono Kristin Armstrong
9th Overall Rhône-Alpes Isère Tour
2019
1st Points classification, Tour de l'Avenir
1st Stage 1 (TTT) Giro della Friuli Venezia Giulia
4th Overall Ronde de l'Isard
4th Trofeo Edil C
2021
8th Overall Paris–Nice
2022
4th Overall Tour de la Provence
7th Mercan'Tour Classic
2023 (2 pro wins)
1st Overall Tour of Oman

1st Points classification
1st Young rider classification
1st Stage 3

2nd Overall Tour de Romandie

1st Young rider classification

4th E3 Saxo Classic
7th Overall Tour of Guangxi
8th Overall Paris–Nice
9th Tour of Flanders
Combativity award Stage 9 Tour de France
2024 (2)
1st Overall Paris–Nice

1st Young rider classification

1st Dwars door Vlaanderen
2nd Overall Critérium du Dauphiné

1st Young rider classification

5th E3 Saxo Classic
8th Overall Tour de France
9th Road race, Olympic Games
2025 (1)
1st Overall Paris–Nice

1st Stage 3 (TTT)

4th Dwars door Vlaanderen
6th Overall Critérium du Dauphiné
9th E3 Saxo Classic
10th Overall Vuelta a España
2026
1st Stage 1 (TTT) Tour de France
2nd Overall Tirreno–Adriatico
2nd La Drôme Classic
3rd Tre Valli Varesine
4th Overall Tour Auvergne-Rhône-Alpes

1st Stage 3 (TTT)

4th Ardèche Classic
5th Giro dell'Emilia
8th Road race, UCI Road World Championships
8th Grand Prix Cycliste de Québec
8th Strade Bianche

=== General classification results timeline ===
Grand Tour general classification results
Grand Tour	2020	2021	2022	2023	2024	2025	2026
Giro d'Italia	—	98	—	—	—	—	—
Tour de France	—	—	20	DNF	8	19	30
Vuelta a España	—	—	—	—	—	10	—
Major stage race general classification results
Major stage race	2020	2021	2022	2023	2024	2025	2026
Paris–Nice	—	8	DNF	8	1	1	—
Tirreno–Adriatico	46	—	—	—	—	—	2
Volta a Catalunya	NH	—	—	—	—	—	—
Tour of the Basque Country	NH	—	—	—	—	—	—
Tour de Romandie	NH	—	—	2	—	—	—
Critérium du Dauphiné	—	—	13	63	2	6	4
Tour de Suisse	NH	—	—	—	—	—	—

=== Classics results timeline ===
Monument	2020	2021	2022	2023	2024	2025	2026
Milan–San Remo	17	—	—	—	—	—	42
Tour of Flanders	—	—	—	9	31	47	—
Paris–Roubaix	NH	65	—	—	—	—	—
Liège–Bastogne–Liège	45	56	—	—	—	—	—
Giro di Lombardia	—	—	—	23	DNF	—	
Classic	2020	2021	2022	2023	2024	2025	2026
Strade Bianche	DNF	—	—	—	—	—	8
E3 Saxo Bank Classic	NH	—	—	4	5	9	—
Dwars door Vlaanderen	—	—	—	—	1	4	—
La Flèche Wallonne	32	91	12	—	—	—	—
Clásica de San Sebastián	NH	65	—	—	—	—	12
Grand Prix Cycliste de Québec	NH	NH	—	42	35	—	8
Grand Prix Cycliste de Montréal	NH	NH	—	24	12	—	19
Giro dell'Emilia	—	—	DNF	19	17	—	5
Tre Valli Varesine	—	—	95	—	NR	—	3

Legend
—	Did not compete
DNF	Did not finish
NH	Not held
NR	No result
