= Michał Paluta =

Polish cyclist (born 1995)

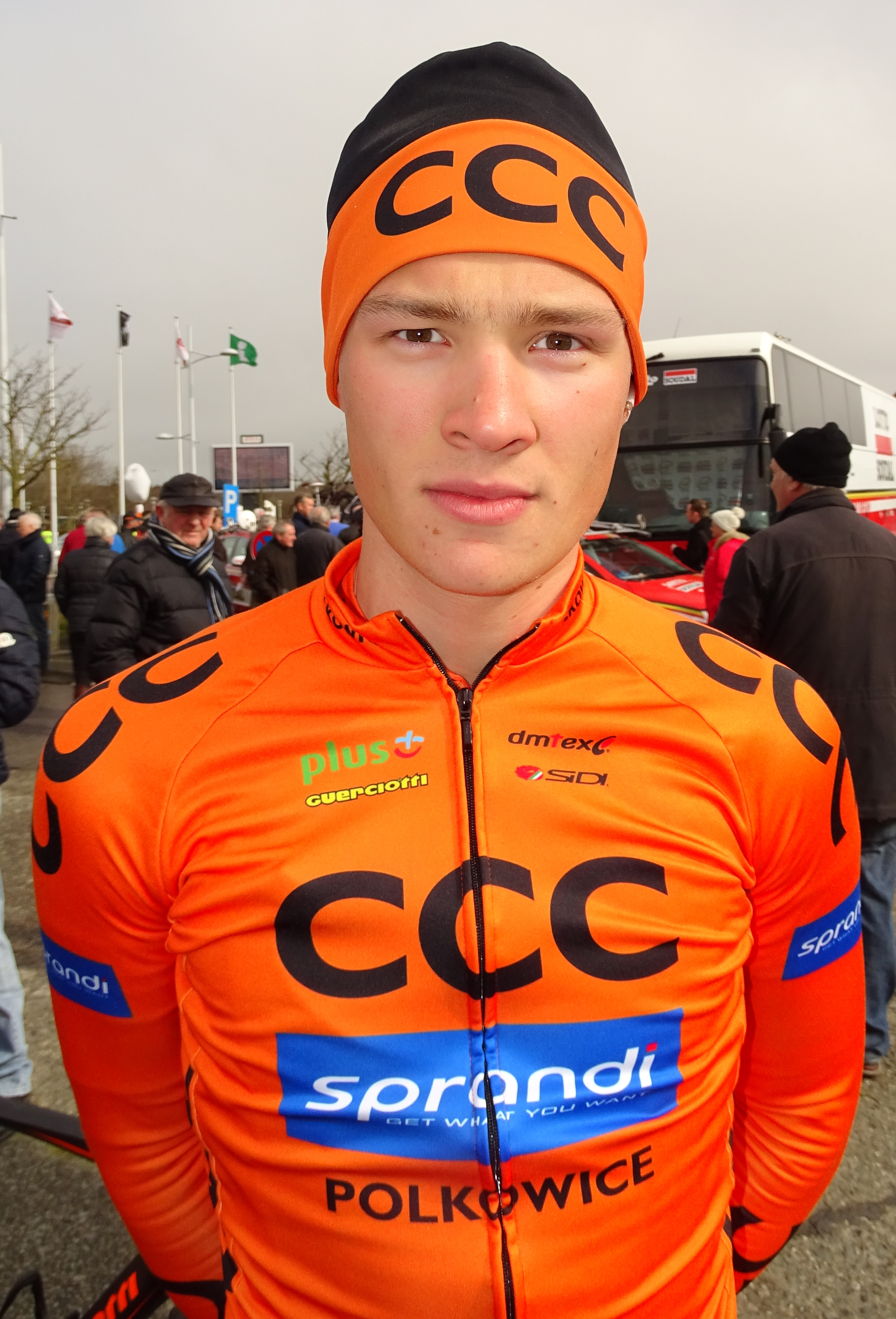
- Paluta in 2016.

Personal information
- Full name: Michał Paluta
- Born: 4 October 1995 (age 31) Strzelce Krajeńskie, Poland
- Height: 174 cm (5 ft 9 in)
- Weight: 64 kg (141 lb)

Cycling career
- Sport: Cycling
- Current team: Santic–Wibatech
- Disciplines: Road; Cyclo-cross
- Role: Rider
- Rider type: All-rounder

Amateur team
- 2014: TKK Pacific Toruń

Professional teams
- 2015–2019: CCC–Sprandi–Polkowice
- 2020: CCC Team
- 2021: Global 6 Cycling
- 2024–: Santic–Wibatech

Major wins
- One-day races and Classics National Road Race Championships (2019)

Michał Paluta (born 4 October 1995) is a Polish professional racing cyclist, who currently rides for UCI Continental team Santic–Wibatech. He has competed in one Grand Tour: the 2020 Vuelta a España.

== Major results ==
=== Road ===
2013
1st Time trial, National Junior Championships
2015
1st Road race, National Under-23 Championships
2016
1st Road race, National Under-23 Championships
2nd Overall Carpathian Couriers Race
2019
1st Road race, National Championships
8th Korona Kocich Gór
2021
8th Prueba Villafranca de Ordizia
10th GP Adria Mobil
2024
1st Mountains classification, Tour de Pologne
4th Silesian Classic
5th Overall Belgrade–Banja Luka
5th Overall Okolo Jižních Čech

==== Grand Tour general classification results timeline ====
Grand Tour	2020
Giro d'Italia	—
Tour de France	—
Vuelta a España	118

Legend
—	Did not compete
DNF	Did not finish

=== Cyclo-cross ===
2011–2012
1st National Junior Championships
3rd Junior Plzeň
2012–2013
1st National Junior Championships
1st Junior Gościęcin
2013–2014
3rd National Under-23 Championships
2014–2015
2nd National Under-23 Championships
2023–2024
3rd Zielona Góra
3rd Laskowice
