= 2024 UCI World Tour =

Road cycling competitions

- Fourteenth edition of the UCI WorldTour

Details
- Dates: 16 January – 20 October
- Location: Australia; Canada; China; Europe; United Arab Emirates
- Races: 35

The 2024 UCI World Tour was a series of races that included thirty-five road cycling events throughout the 2024 cycling season. The tour started with the Tour Down Under on 16 January, and concluded with the Tour of Guangxi on 20 October.

At the end of the season, Slovenian rider Tadej Pogačar (UAE Team Emirates) led the overall road world rankings, ahead of Belgian riders Remco Evenepoel (Soudal–Quick-Step) and Jasper Philipsen (Alpecin–Deceuninck). Pogačar won seven World Tour events during the season, including two Grand Tours (Giro d'Italia and Tour de France) and two of the five cycling monuments.

== Events ==
Races in the 2024 UCI World Tour
Race	Date	Winner	Second	Third
(Australia) Tour Down Under	16–21 January	Stephen Williams (GBR)	Jhonatan Narváez (ECU)	Isaac del Toro (MEX)
(Australia) Cadel Evans Great Ocean Road Race	28 January	Laurence Pithie (NZL)	Natnael Tesfatsion (ERI)	Georg Zimmermann (GER)
(United Arab Emirates) UAE Tour	19–25 February	Lennert Van Eetvelt (BEL)	Ben O'Connor (AUS)	Pello Bilbao (ESP)
(Belgium) Omloop Het Nieuwsblad	24 February	Jan Tratnik (SLO)	Nils Politt (GER)	Wout van Aert (BEL)
(Italy) Strade Bianche	2 March	Tadej Pogačar (SLO)	Toms Skujiņš (LAT)	Maxim Van Gils (BEL)
(France) Paris–Nice	3–10 March	Matteo Jorgenson (USA)	Remco Evenepoel (BEL)	Brandon McNulty (USA)
(Italy) Tirreno–Adriatico	4–10 March	Jonas Vingegaard (DEN)	Juan Ayuso (ESP)	Jai Hindley (AUS)
(Italy) Milan–San Remo	16 March	Jasper Philipsen (BEL)	Michael Matthews (AUS)	Tadej Pogačar (SLO)
(Spain) Volta a Catalunya	18–24 March	Tadej Pogačar (SLO)	Mikel Landa (ESP)	Egan Bernal (COL)
(Belgium) Classic Brugge–De Panne	20 March	Jasper Philipsen (BEL)	Tim Merlier (BEL)	Danny van Poppel (NED)
(Belgium) E3 Saxo Classic	22 March	Mathieu van der Poel (NED)	Jasper Stuyven (BEL)	Wout van Aert (BEL)
(Belgium) Gent–Wevelgem	24 March	Mads Pedersen (DEN)	Mathieu van der Poel (NED)	Jordi Meeus (BEL)
(Belgium) Dwars door Vlaanderen	27 March	Matteo Jorgenson (USA)	Jonas Abrahamsen (NOR)	Stefan Küng (SUI)
(Belgium) Tour of Flanders	31 March	Mathieu van der Poel (NED)	Luca Mozzato (ITA)	Nils Politt (GER)
(Spain) Tour of the Basque Country	1–6 April	Juan Ayuso (ESP)	Carlos Rodríguez (ESP)	Mattias Skjelmose (DEN)
(France) Paris–Roubaix	7 April	Mathieu van der Poel (NED)	Jasper Philipsen (BEL)	Mads Pedersen (DEN)
(Netherlands) Amstel Gold Race	14 April	Tom Pidcock (GBR)	Marc Hirschi (SUI)	Tiesj Benoot (BEL)
(Belgium) La Flèche Wallonne	17 April	Stephen Williams (GBR)	Kévin Vauquelin (FRA)	Maxim Van Gils (BEL)
(Belgium) Liège–Bastogne–Liège	21 April	Tadej Pogačar (SLO)	Romain Bardet (FRA)	Mathieu van der Poel (NED)
(Switzerland) Tour de Romandie	23–28 April	Carlos Rodríguez (ESP)	Aleksandr Vlasov (Note: On 1 March 2022, the UCI announced that cyclists from Russia and Belarus would no longer compete under the name or flag of those respective countries due to the Russian invasion of Ukraine.)	Florian Lipowitz (GER)
(Germany) Eschborn–Frankfurt	1 May	Maxim Van Gils (BEL)	Alex Aranburu (ESP)	Riley Sheehan (USA)
(Italy) Giro d'Italia	4–26 May	Tadej Pogačar (SLO)	Daniel Martínez (COL)	Geraint Thomas (GBR)
(France) Critérium du Dauphiné	2–9 June	Primož Roglič (SLO)	Matteo Jorgenson (USA)	Derek Gee (CAN)
(Switzerland) Tour de Suisse	9–16 June	Adam Yates (GBR)	João Almeida (POR)	Mattias Skjelmose (DEN)
Tour de France	29 June – 21 July	Tadej Pogačar (SLO)	Jonas Vingegaard (DEN)	Remco Evenepoel (BEL)
(Spain) Clásica de San Sebastián	10 August	Marc Hirschi (SUI)	Julian Alaphilippe (FRA)	Lennert Van Eetvelt (BEL)
(Poland) Tour de Pologne	12–18 August	Jonas Vingegaard (DEN)	Diego Ulissi (ITA)	Wilco Kelderman (NED)
(Spain) Vuelta a España	17 August – 8 September	Primož Roglič (SLO)	Ben O'Connor (AUS)	Enric Mas (ESP)
Bretagne Classic Ouest–France	25 August	Marc Hirschi (SUI)	Paul Magnier (FRA)	Magnus Cort (DEN)
(Belgium) / (Netherlands) Renewi Tour	28 August – 1 September	Tim Wellens (BEL)	Alec Segaert (BEL)	Per Strand Hagenes (NOR)
(Germany) Hamburg Cyclassics	8 September	Olav Kooij (NED)	Jonathan Milan (ITA)	Biniam Girmay (ERI)
(Canada) Grand Prix Cycliste de Québec	13 September	Michael Matthews (AUS)	Biniam Girmay (ERI)	Rudy Molard (FRA)
(Canada) Grand Prix Cycliste de Montréal	15 September	Tadej Pogačar (SLO)	Pello Bilbao (ESP)	Julian Alaphilippe (FRA)
(Italy) Il Lombardia	12 October	Tadej Pogačar (SLO)	Remco Evenepoel (BEL)	Giulio Ciccone (ITA)
(China) Tour of Guangxi	15–20 October	Lennert Van Eetvelt (BEL)	Oscar Onley (GBR)	Alex Baudin (FRA)

== Teams ==
The eighteen WorldTeams were automatically invited to compete in events, with the top two UCI ProTeams listed on the 2023 UCI World Ranking (Lotto–Dstny and Israel–Premier Tech) also invited automatically. Other teams were invited by the organisers of each race.

UCI WorldTeams

- Alpecin–Deceuninck
- Arkéa–B&B Hotels
- Astana Qazaqstan Team
- Cofidis
- Decathlon–AG2R La Mondiale
- EF Education–EasyPost
- Groupama–FDJ
- INEOS Grenadiers
- Intermarché–Wanty
- Lidl–Trek
- Movistar Team
- Red Bull–Bora–Hansgrohe
- Soudal–Quick-Step
- Team Bahrain Victorious
- Team dsm–firmenich PostNL
- Team Jayco–AlUla
- Visma–Lease a Bike
- UAE Team Emirates
