= 2024 Il Lombardia =

Cycling race

2024 UCI World Tour, race 34 of 35

Race details
- Dates: 12 October 2024
- Stages: 1
- Distance: 255 km (158.4 mi)
- Winning time: 6h 04' 58"

Results
	Winner	Tadej Pogačar (SLO)	(UAE Team Emirates)
	Second	Remco Evenepoel (BEL)	(Soudal–Quick-Step)
	Third	Giulio Ciccone (ITA)	(Lidl–Trek)

The 2024 Il Lombardia was a one-day road cycling race that took place on 12 October 2024 in the Italian region of Lombardy. It was the 34th event of the 2024 UCI World Tour and was the 118th edition of Il Lombardia.

The race was won by Tadej Pogačar, who attacked with 48 km to go and rode solo to the finish. With a gap of 3 minutes 15 seconds to second place Remco Evenepoel, it was the largest winning margin since Eddy Merckx in 1971. It was also Pogačar's fourth consecutive victory at the race, the most since Fausto Coppi.

== Teams ==
Twenty-five teams, consisting of 18 UCI WorldTeams and seven UCI ProTeams, participated in the race. Each team entered seven riders.

UCI WorldTeams

- Alpecin–Deceuninck
- Arkéa–B&B Hotels
- Astana Qazaqstan Team
- Cofidis
- Decathlon–AG2R La Mondiale
- EF Education–EasyPost
- Groupama–FDJ
- Ineos Grenadiers
- Intermarché–Wanty
- Lidl–Trek
- Movistar Team
- Red Bull–Bora–Hansgrohe
- Soudal–Quick-Step
- Team Bahrain Victorious
- Team dsm–firmenich PostNL
- Team Jayco–AlUla
- UAE Team Emirates
- Visma–Lease a Bike

UCI ProTeams

- Team Corratec–Vini Fantini
- Israel–Premier Tech
- Lotto–Dstny
- Polti–Kometa
- Tudor Pro Cycling Team
- Uno-X Mobility
- VF Group–Bardiani–CSF–Faizanè

== Results ==
Result
Rank	Rider	Team	Time
1	Tadej Pogačar (SLO)	UAE Team Emirates	6h 04' 58"
2	Remco Evenepoel (BEL)	Soudal–Quick-Step	+ 3’ 16"
3	Giulio Ciccone (ITA)	Lidl–Trek	+ 4’ 31"
4	Ion Izagirre (ESP)	Cofidis	+ 4’ 34"
5	Enric Mas (ESP)	Movistar Team	+ 4’ 34"
6	Pavel Sivakov (FRA)	UAE Team Emirates	+ 4’ 34"
7	Lennert Van Eetvelt (BEL)	Lotto–Dstny	+ 4’ 34"
8	Neilson Powless (USA)	EF Education–EasyPost	+ 4' 58"
9	David Gaudu (FRA)	Groupama–FDJ	+ 4' 58"
10	Xandro Meurisse (BEL)	Alpecin–Deceuninck	+ 4' 58"
