= 2024 Gent–Wevelgem =

Belgian one-day cycling race

2024 UCI World Tour, race 12 of 35
- Event poster with previous winners Marlen Reusser and Christophe Laporte

Race details
- Dates: 24 March 2024
- Stages: 1
- Distance: 253.1 km (157.3 mi)
- Winning time: 5h 36' 00"

Results
	Winner	Mads Pedersen (DEN)	(Lidl–Trek)
	Second	Mathieu van der Poel (NED)	(Alpecin–Deceuninck)
	Third	Jordi Meeus (BEL)	(Bora–Hansgrohe)

The 2024 Gent–Wevelgem in Flanders Fields was a road cycling one-day race that took place on 24 March in the provinces of West Flanders and Hainaut in west Belgium, over 253.1 kilometres between Ypres and Wevelgem. It was the 86th edition of Gent–Wevelgem and the 12th event of the 2024 UCI World Tour. The winner was Mads Pedersen of the Lidl–Trek team.

The route of the 2024 Gent–Wevelgem

== Teams ==
All 18 UCI WorldTeams and seven UCI ProTeams made up the 25 teams that participated in the race.

UCI WorldTeams

- Alpecin–Deceuninck
- Arkéa–B&B Hotels
- Astana Qazaqstan Team
- Bora–Hansgrohe
- Cofidis
- Decathlon–AG2R La Mondiale
- EF Education–EasyPost
- Groupama–FDJ
- INEOS Grenadiers
- Intermarché–Wanty
- Lidl–Trek
- Movistar Team
- Soudal–Quick-Step
- Team Bahrain Victorious
- Team dsm–firmenich PostNL
- Team Jayco–AlUla
- UAE Team Emirates
- Visma–Lease a Bike

UCI ProTeams

- Israel–Premier Tech
- Lotto–Dstny
- Q36.5 Pro Cycling Team
- Team Flanders–Baloise
- Team TotalEnergies
- Tudor Pro Cycling Team
- Uno-X Mobility

== Result ==
Result (1–10)
Rank	Rider	Team	Time
1	Mads Pedersen (DEN)	Lidl–Trek	5h 36' 00"
2	Mathieu van der Poel (NED)	Alpecin–Deceuninck	+ 0"
3	Jordi Meeus (BEL)	Bora–Hansgrohe	+ 16"
4	Jasper Philipsen (BEL)	Alpecin–Deceuninck	+ 16"
5	Jonathan Milan (ITA)	Lidl–Trek	+ 16"
6	Olav Kooij (NED)	Visma–Lease a Bike	+ 16"
7	Biniam Girmay (ERI)	Intermarché–Wanty	+ 16"
8	Tim Merlier (BEL)	Soudal–Quick-Step	+ 16"
9	Dylan Groenewegen (NED)	Team Jayco–AlUla	+ 16"
10	Matteo Trentin (ITA)	Tudor Pro Cycling Team	+ 16"
