= 2024 Hamburg Cyclassics =

Cycling race

2024 BEMER Cyclassics
2024 UCI World Tour, race 31 of 35

Race details
- Dates: 8 September 2024
- Stages: 1
- Distance: 177.5 km (110.3 mi)
- Winning time: 3h 39' 49"

Results
	Winner	Olav Kooij (NED)	(Visma–Lease a Bike)
	Second	Jonathan Milan (ITA)	(Lidl–Trek)
	Third	Biniam Girmay (ERI)	(Intermarché–Wanty)

The 2024 BEMER Cyclassics was a road cycling one-day race that took place on 8 September in Germany. It was the 27th edition of EuroEyes Cyclassics and the 31st event of the 2024 UCI World Tour.

== Teams ==
All eighteen UCI WorldTeams and five UCI ProTeams made up the twenty-three teams that participated in the race.

UCI WorldTeams

- Alpecin–Deceuninck
- Arkéa–B&B Hotels
- Astana Qazaqstan Team
- Cofidis
- Decathlon–AG2R La Mondiale
- EF Education–EasyPost
- Groupama–FDJ
- Ineos Grenadiers
- Intermarché–Wanty
- Lidl–Trek
- Movistar Team
- Red Bull–Bora–Hansgrohe
- Soudal–Quick-Step
- Team Bahrain Victorious
- Team dsm–firmenich PostNL
- Team Jayco–AlUla
- UAE Team Emirates
- Visma–Lease a Bike

UCI ProTeams

- Israel–Premier Tech
- Lotto–Dstny
- Q36.5 Pro Cycling Team
- Tudor Pro Cycling Team
- Uno-X Mobility

== Result ==
Result
Rank	Rider	Team	Time
1	Olav Kooij (NED)	Visma–Lease a Bike	3h 39' 49"
2	Jonathan Milan (ITA)	Lidl–Trek	+ 0"
3	Biniam Girmay (ERI)	Intermarché–Wanty	+ 0"
4	Jordi Meeus (BEL)	Red Bull–Bora–Hansgrohe	+ 0"
5	Alexander Kristoff (NOR)	Uno-X Mobility	+ 0"
6	Axel Zingle (FRA)	Cofidis	+ 0"
7	Jasper Philipsen (BEL)	Alpecin–Deceuninck	+ 0"
8	Mike Teunissen (NED)	Intermarché–Wanty	+ 0"
9	Matteo Trentin (ITA)	Tudor Pro Cycling Team	+ 0"
10	Stefano Oldani (ITA)	Cofidis	+ 0"
