= 2024 Dwars door Vlaanderen =

Cycling race

2024 UCI World Tour, race 13 of 35
- Event poster with previous winners Christophe Laporte and Demi Vollering

Race details
- Dates: 27 March 2024
- Stages: 1
- Distance: 188.6 km (117.2 mi)
- Winning time: 4h 07' 44"

Results
| | Winner | Matteo Jorgenson (USA) | (Visma–Lease a Bike) |
| | Second | Jonas Abrahamsen (NOR) | (Uno-X Mobility) |
| | Third | Stefan Küng (SUI) | (Groupama–FDJ) |

The 2024 Dwars door Vlaanderen was a road cycling one-day race that took place on 27 March in Belgium. It was the 78th edition of Dwars door Vlaanderen and the 13th event of the 2024 UCI World Tour.

The race was won by American rider Matteo Jorgenson of Visma–Lease a Bike after a solo attack.

== Teams ==
All eighteen UCI WorldTeams and seven UCI ProTeams participated in the race.

UCI WorldTeams

- Alpecin–Deceuninck
- Arkéa–B&B Hotels
- Astana Qazaqstan Team
- Bora–Hansgrohe
- Cofidis
- Decathlon–AG2R La Mondiale
- EF Education–EasyPost
- Groupama–FDJ
- Ineos Grenadiers
- Intermarché–Wanty
- Lidl–Trek
- Movistar Team
- Soudal–Quick-Step
- Team Bahrain Victorious
- Team dsm–firmenich PostNL
- Team Jayco–AlUla
- UAE Team Emirates
- Visma–Lease a Bike

UCI ProTeams

- Bingoal WB
- Israel–Premier Tech
- Lotto–Dstny
- Q36.5 Pro Cycling Team
- Team Flanders–Baloise
- Team TotalEnergies
- Uno-X Mobility

== Results ==
Result
| Rank | Rider | Team | Time |
|---|---|---|---|
| 1 | Matteo Jorgenson (USA) | Visma–Lease a Bike | 4h 07' 44" |
| 2 | Jonas Abrahamsen (NOR) | Uno-X Mobility | + 29" |
| 3 | Stefan Küng (SUI) | Groupama–FDJ | + 29" |
| 4 | Tiesj Benoot (BEL) | Visma–Lease a Bike | + 29" |
| 5 | Dries De Bondt (BEL) | Decathlon–AG2R La Mondiale | + 29" |
| 6 | Joshua Tarling (GBR) | Ineos Grenadiers | + 44" |
| 7 | Jonathan Milan (ITA) | Lidl–Trek | + 1' 47" |
| 8 | Michael Valgren (DEN) | EF Education–EasyPost | + 1' 47" |
| 9 | Mathias Norsgaard (DEN) | Movistar Team | + 1' 47" |
| 10 | Thomas Gachignard (FRA) | Team TotalEnergies | + 1' 47" |
