= 2024 Grand Prix Cycliste de Montréal =

One-day cycling race in Canada

2024 UCI World Tour, race 33 of 35
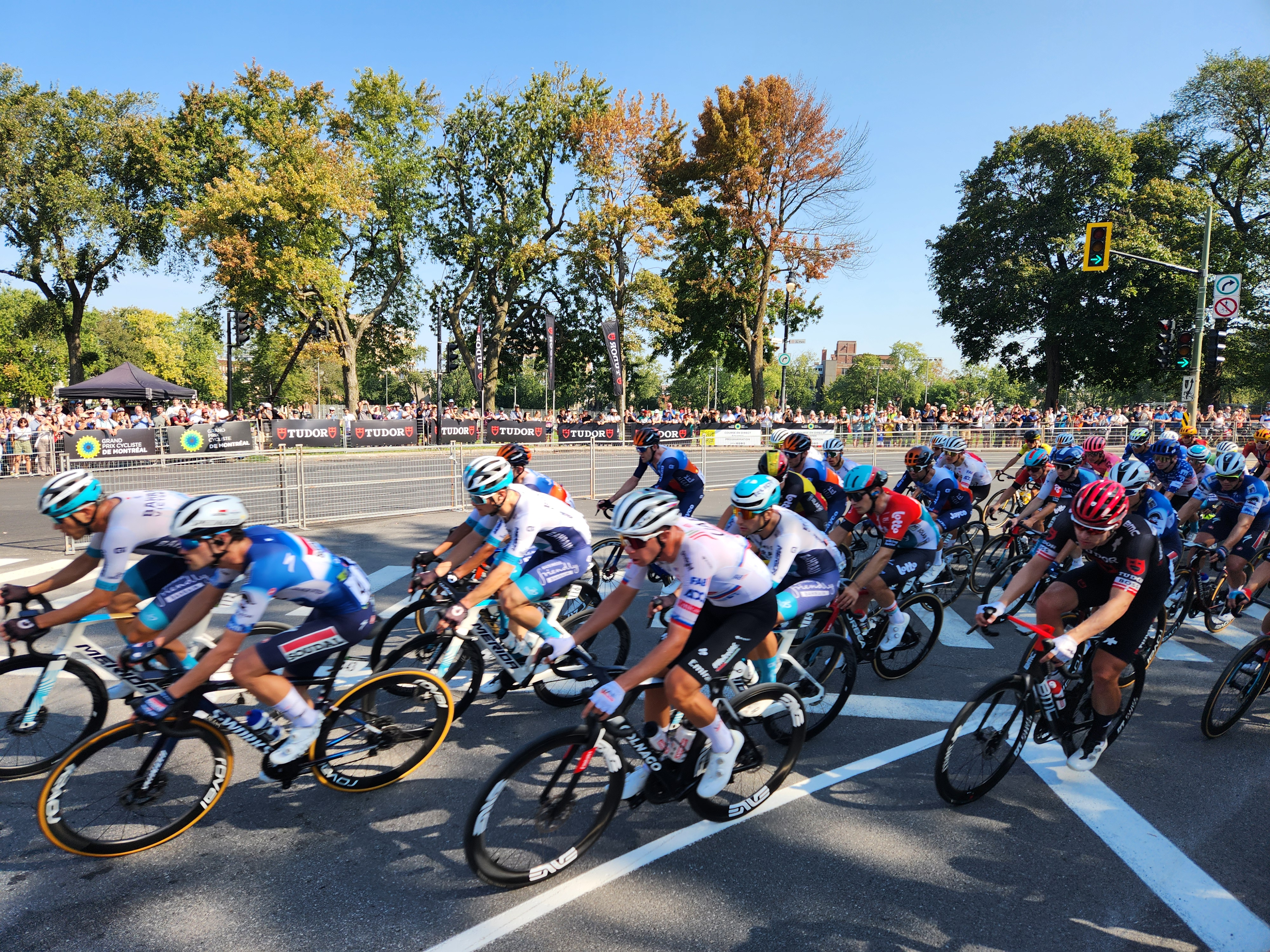
- Peloton

Race details
- Dates: 15 September 2024
- Stages: 1
- Distance: 209.1 km (129.9 mi)
- Winning time: 5h 28' 15"

Results
	Winner	Tadej Pogačar (SLO)	(UAE Team Emirates)
	Second	Pello Bilbao (ESP)	(Team Bahrain Victorious)
	Third	Julian Alaphilippe (FRA)	(Soudal–Quick-Step)

The 2024 Grand Prix Cycliste de Montréal was a road cycling one-day race that took place on 15 September 2024 in Montréal, Canada. It was the 13th edition of the Grand Prix Cycliste de Montréal and the 33rd event of the 2024 UCI World Tour. It was won for the second time by Slovenian rider Tadej Pogačar of UAE Team Emirates, after a solo attack on the penultimate lap.

== Teams ==
All eighteen UCI WorldTeams, five UCI ProTeams, and the Canadian national team made up the twenty-four teams that participated in the race.

UCI WorldTeams

- Alpecin–Deceuninck
- Arkéa–B&B Hotels
- Astana Qazaqstan Team
- Cofidis
- Decathlon–AG2R La Mondiale
- EF Education–EasyPost
- Groupama–FDJ
- Ineos Grenadiers
- Intermarché–Wanty
- Lidl–Trek
- Movistar Team
- Red Bull–Bora–Hansgrohe
- Soudal–Quick-Step
- Team Bahrain Victorious
- Team dsm–firmenich PostNL
- Team Jayco–AlUla
- UAE Team Emirates
- Visma–Lease a Bike

UCI ProTeams

- Israel–Premier Tech
- Lotto–Dstny
- Team Novo Nordisk
- Tudor Pro Cycling Team
- Uno-X Mobility

National Teams

- Canada

== Course ==
The race used a hilly 12.3 kilometres (7.6 mi) circuit around Mount Royal, with the longest climb being Côte Camilien-Houde (1.8 km long and 8% average grade). 17 laps of the circuit made the race 209.1 kilometres (129.9 mi) in length.

== Result ==
Result
Rank	Rider	Team	Time
1	Tadej Pogačar (SLO)	UAE Team Emirates	5h 28' 15"
2	Pello Bilbao (ESP)	Team Bahrain Victorious	+ 24"
3	Julian Alaphilippe (FRA)	Soudal–Quick-Step	+ 40"
4	Maxim Van Gils (BEL)	Lotto–Dstny	+ 40"
5	Ion Izagirre (ESP)	Cofidis	+ 40"
6	Toms Skujiņš (LAT)	Lidl–Trek	+ 40"
7	Tiesj Benoot (BEL)	Visma–Lease a Bike	+ 40"
8	Michael Woods (CAN)	Israel–Premier Tech	+ 40"
9	Edoardo Zambanini (ITA)	Team Bahrain Victorious	+ 40"
10	Jai Hindley (AUS)	Red Bull–Bora–Hansgrohe	+ 40"
