= 2024 Clásica de Almería =

2024 UCI ProSeries

Race details
- Dates: 11 February 2024
- Stages: 1
- Distance: 192.3 km (119.5 mi)
- Winning time: 4h 11' 29"

Results
	Winner	Olav Kooij (NED)	(Visma–Lease a Bike)
	Second	Matteo Moschetti (ITA)	(Q36.5 Pro Cycling Team)
	Third	Matteo Trentin (ITA)	(Tudor Pro Cycling Team)

The 2024 Clásica de Almería was the 39th edition of the Clásica de Almería one-day road cycling race. It was held on 11 February 2024 as a category 1. Pro race on the 2024 UCI ProSeries.

== Teams ==
Eight of the 18 UCI WorldTeams, eleven UCI ProTeams and one UCI Continental team made up the 20 teams that participated in the race.

UCI WorldTeams

- Arkéa–B&B Hotels
- Bora–Hansgrohe
- Cofidis
- Groupama–FDJ
- Intermarché–Wanty
- Movistar Team
- Visma–Lease a Bike
- UAE Team Emirates

UCI ProTeams

- Burgos BH
- Caja Rural–Seguros RGA
- Equipo Kern Pharma
- Euskaltel–Euskadi
- Lotto–Dstny
- Polti–Kometa
- Q36.5 Pro Cycling Team
- Team Flanders–Baloise
- Team TotalEnergies
- Tudor Pro Cycling Team
- Uno-X Mobility

UCI Continental teams

- Illes Balears Arabay Cycling

== Result ==
Result (1–10)
Rank	Rider	Team	Time
1	Olav Kooij (NED)	Visma–Lease a Bike	4h 11' 29"
2	Matteo Moschetti (ITA)	Q36.5 Pro Cycling Team	+ 0"
3	Matteo Trentin (ITA)	Tudor Pro Cycling Team	+ 0"
4	Arnaud De Lie (BEL)	Lotto–Dstny	+ 0"
5	Gerben Thijssen (BEL)	Intermarché–Wanty	+ 0"
6	Milan Fretin (BEL)	Cofidis	+ 0"
7	Jason Tesson (FRA)	Team TotalEnergies	+ 0"
8	Jordi Meeus (BEL)	Bora–Hansgrohe	+ 0"
9	Lewis Askey (GBR)	Groupama–FDJ	+ 0"
10	Wout van Aert (BEL)	Visma–Lease a Bike	+ 0"
