= 2024 Tirreno–Adriatico =

Italian cycling race

2024 UCI World Tour, race 7 of 35

Race details
- Dates: 4–10 March 2024
- Stages: 7
- Distance: 1,115 km (693 mi)
- Winning time: 26h 22' 23"

Results
Jersey awarded to the overall winner	Winner	Jonas Vingegaard (DEN)	(Visma–Lease a Bike)
	Second	Juan Ayuso (ESP)	(UAE Team Emirates)
	Third	Jai Hindley (AUS)	(Bora–Hansgrohe)
Jersey awarded to the points classification winner	Points	Jonathan Milan (ITA)	(Lidl–Trek)
Jersey awarded to the mountains classification winner	Mountains	Jonas Vingegaard (DEN)	(Visma–Lease a Bike)
Jersey awarded to the young rider classification winner	Young rider	Juan Ayuso (ESP)	(UAE Team Emirates)
	Team	(United Arab Emirates) UAE Team Emirates	

The 2024 Tirreno–Adriatico was a road cycling stage race that took place between 4 and 10 March in Italy. It was the 59th edition of the Tirreno–Adriatico and the seventh race of the 2024 UCI World Tour.

== Teams ==
All 18 UCI WorldTeams and seven UCI ProTeams made up the 25 teams that participated in the race.

UCI WorldTeams

- Alpecin–Deceuninck
- Arkéa–B&B Hotels
- Astana Qazaqstan Team
- Bora–Hansgrohe
- Cofidis
- Decathlon–AG2R La Mondiale
- EF Education–EasyPost
- Groupama–FDJ
- INEOS Grenadiers
- Intermarché–Wanty
- Lidl–Trek
- Movistar Team
- Soudal–Quick-Step
- Team Bahrain Victorious
- Team dsm–firmenich PostNL
- Team Jayco–AlUla
- UAE Team Emirates
- Visma–Lease a Bike

UCI ProTeams

- Israel–Premier Tech
- Q36.5 Pro Cycling Team
- Team Corratec–Vini Fantini
- Polti–Kometa
- Tudor Pro Cycling Team
- Uno-X Mobility
- VF Group–Bardiani–CSF–Faizanè

== Route ==
Stage characteristics and winners
Stage	Date	Course	Distance	Elevation gain	Type	Stage winner
1	4 March	Lido di Camaiore to Lido di Camaiore	10 km (6.2 mi)	10 m (33 ft)	Individual time trial	Juan Ayuso (ESP)
2	5 March	Camaiore to Follonica	198 km (123 mi)	1,200 m (3,900 ft)	Hilly stage	Jasper Philipsen (BEL)
3	6 March	Volterra to Gualdo Tadino	220 km (140 mi)	2,100 m (6,900 ft)	Intermediate stage	Phil Bauhaus (GER)
4	7 March	Arrone to Giulianova	207 km (129 mi)	2,600 m (8,500 ft)	Mountain stage	Jonathan Milan (ITA)
5	8 March	Torricella Sicura to Valle Castellana	146 km (91 mi)	2,800 m (9,200 ft)	Mountain stage	Jonas Vingegaard (DEN)
6	9 March	Sassoferrato to Cagli	180 km (110 mi)	3,100 m (10,200 ft)	Mountain stage	Jonas Vingegaard (DEN)
7	10 March	San Benedetto del Tronto to San Benedetto del Tronto	154 km (96 mi)	1,000 m (3,300 ft)	Flat stage	Jonathan Milan (ITA)
Total			1,119 km (695 mi)	12,800 m (42,000 ft)		

== Stages ==
=== Stage 1 ===
4 March 2024 — Lido di Camaiore to Lido di Camaiore, 10 km (6.2 mi) (ITT)

Stage 1 Result
Rank	Rider	Team	Time
1	Juan Ayuso (ESP)	UAE Team Emirates	11' 24"
2	Filippo Ganna (ITA)	INEOS Grenadiers	+ 1"
3	Jonathan Milan (ITA)	Lidl–Trek	+ 12"
4	Ethan Vernon (GBR)	Israel–Premier Tech	+ 13"
5	Josef Černý (CZE)	Soudal–Quick-Step	+ 14"
6	Søren Wærenskjold (NOR)	Uno-X Mobility	+ 15"
7	Antonio Tiberi (ITA)	Team Bahrain Victorious	+ 17"
8	Kévin Vauquelin (FRA)	Arkéa–B&B Hotels	+ 18"
9	Jonas Vingegaard (DEN)	Visma–Lease a Bike	+ 22"
10	Romain Grégoire (FRA)	Groupama–FDJ	+ 22"

General classification after Stage 1
Rank	Rider	Team	Time
1	Juan Ayuso (ESP)	UAE Team Emirates	11' 24"
2	Filippo Ganna (ITA)	INEOS Grenadiers	+ 1"
3	Jonathan Milan (ITA)	Lidl–Trek	+ 12"
4	Ethan Vernon (GBR)	Israel–Premier Tech	+ 13"
5	Josef Černý (CZE)	Soudal–Quick-Step	+ 14"
6	Søren Wærenskjold (NOR)	Uno-X Mobility	+ 15"
7	Antonio Tiberi (ITA)	Team Bahrain Victorious	+ 17"
8	Kévin Vauquelin (FRA)	Arkéa–B&B Hotels	+ 18"
9	Jonas Vingegaard (DEN)	Visma–Lease a Bike	+ 22"
10	Romain Grégoire (FRA)	Groupama–FDJ	+ 22"

=== Stage 2 ===
5 March 2024 – Camaiore to Follonica, 198 km (123 mi)

Stage 2 Result
Rank	Rider	Team	Time
1	Jasper Philipsen (BEL)	Alpecin–Deceuninck	4h 32' 07"
2	Tim Merlier (BEL)	Soudal–Quick-Step	+ 0"
3	Axel Zingle (FRA)	Cofidis	+ 0"
4	Amaury Capiot (BEL)	Arkéa–B&B Hotels	+ 0"
5	Casper van Uden (NED)	Team dsm–firmenich PostNL	+ 0"
6	Søren Wærenskjold (NOR)	Uno-X Mobility	+ 0"
7	Giovanni Lonardi (ITA)	Polti–Kometa	+ 0"
8	Ethan Vernon (GBR)	Israel–Premier Tech	+ 0"
9	Jonathan Milan (ITA)	Lidl–Trek	+ 0"
10	Fabian Lienhard (SUI)	Groupama–FDJ	+ 0"

General classification after Stage 2
Rank	Rider	Team	Time
1	Juan Ayuso (ESP)	UAE Team Emirates	4h 43' 31"
2	Filippo Ganna (ITA)	INEOS Grenadiers	+ 1"
3	Jonathan Milan (ITA)	Lidl–Trek	+ 12"
4	Ethan Vernon (GBR)	Israel–Premier Tech	+ 13"
5	Søren Wærenskjold (NOR)	Uno-X Mobility	+ 15"
6	Antonio Tiberi (ITA)	Team Bahrain Victorious	+ 17"
7	Kévin Vauquelin (FRA)	Arkéa–B&B Hotels	+ 18"
8	Jonas Vingegaard (DEN)	Visma–Lease a Bike	+ 22"
9	Romain Grégoire (FRA)	Groupama–FDJ	+ 22"
10	Tobias Ludvigsson (SWE)	Q36.5 Pro Cycling Team	+ 23"

=== Stage 3 ===
6 March 2024 – Volterra to Gualdo Tadino, 220 km (140 mi)

Stage 3 Result
Rank	Rider	Team	Time
1	Phil Bauhaus (GER)	Team Bahrain Victorious	5h 25' 51"
2	Jonathan Milan (ITA)	Lidl–Trek	+ 0"
3	Kévin Vauquelin (FRA)	Arkéa–B&B Hotels	+ 0"
4	Alberto Bettiol (ITA)	EF Education–EasyPost	+ 0"
5	Andrea Vendrame (ITA)	Decathlon–AG2R La Mondiale	+ 0"
6	Simone Velasco (ITA)	Astana Qazaqstan Team	+ 0"
7	Damiano Caruso (ITA)	Team Bahrain Victorious	+ 0"
8	Marius Mayrhofer (GER)	Tudor Pro Cycling Team	+ 0"
9	Kevin Vermaerke (USA)	Team dsm–firmenich PostNL	+ 0"
10	Nikias Arndt (GER)	Team Bahrain Victorious	+ 0"

General classification after Stage 3
Rank	Rider	Team	Time
1	Juan Ayuso (ESP)	UAE Team Emirates	10h 09' 22"
2	Jonathan Milan (ITA)	Lidl–Trek	+ 6"
3	Kévin Vauquelin (FRA)	Arkéa–B&B Hotels	+ 14"
4	Antonio Tiberi (ITA)	Team Bahrain Victorious	+ 17"
5	Jonas Vingegaard (DEN)	Visma–Lease a Bike	+ 22"
6	Romain Grégoire (FRA)	Groupama–FDJ	+ 22"
7	Jai Hindley (AUS)	Bora–Hansgrohe	+ 24"
8	Neilson Powless (USA)	EF Education–EasyPost	+ 26"
9	Max Poole (GBR)	Team dsm–firmenich PostNL	+ 26"
10	Lennard Kämna (GER)	Bora–Hansgrohe	+ 26"

=== Stage 4 ===
7 March 2024 – Arrone to Giulianova, 207 km (129 mi)

Stage 4 Result
Rank	Rider	Team	Time
1	Jonathan Milan (ITA)	Lidl–Trek	4h 56' 44"
2	Jasper Philipsen (BEL)	Alpecin–Deceuninck	+ 0"
3	Corbin Strong (NZL)	Israel–Premier Tech	+ 0"
4	Biniam Girmay (ERI)	Intermarché–Wanty	+ 0"
5	Axel Zingle (FRA)	Cofidis	+ 0"
6	Marius Mayrhofer (GER)	Tudor Pro Cycling Team	+ 0"
7	Jonas Abrahamsen (NOR)	Uno-X Mobility	+ 0"
8	Iván García Cortina (ESP)	Movistar Team	+ 0"
9	Julian Alaphilippe (FRA)	Soudal–Quick-Step	+ 0"
10	Antonio Tiberi (ITA)	Team Bahrain Victorious	+ 0"

General classification after Stage 4
Rank	Rider	Team	Time
1	Jonathan Milan (ITA)	Lidl–Trek	15h 06' 02"
2	Juan Ayuso (ESP)	UAE Team Emirates	+ 4"
3	Kévin Vauquelin (FRA)	Arkéa–B&B Hotels	+ 18"
4	Antonio Tiberi (ITA)	Team Bahrain Victorious	+ 21"
5	Jonas Vingegaard (DEN)	Visma–Lease a Bike	+ 26"
6	Romain Grégoire (FRA)	Groupama–FDJ	+ 26"
7	Jai Hindley (AUS)	Bora–Hansgrohe	+ 28"
8	Neilson Powless (USA)	EF Education–EasyPost	+ 30"
9	Max Poole (GBR)	Team dsm–firmenich PostNL	+ 30"
10	Lennard Kämna (GER)	Bora–Hansgrohe	+ 30"

=== Stage 5 ===
8 March 2024 – Torricella Sicura to Valle Castellana, 146 km (91 mi)

Stage 5 Result
Rank	Rider	Team	Time
1	Jonas Vingegaard (DEN)	Visma–Lease a Bike	3h 28' 27"
2	Juan Ayuso (ESP)	UAE Team Emirates	+ 1' 12"
3	Jai Hindley (AUS)	Bora–Hansgrohe	+ 1' 12"
4	Ben O'Connor (AUS)	Decathlon–AG2R La Mondiale	+ 1' 14"
5	Thymen Arensman (NED)	INEOS Grenadiers	+ 1' 14"
6	Cian Uijtdebroeks (BEL)	Visma–Lease a Bike	+ 1' 14"
7	Isaac del Toro (MEX)	UAE Team Emirates	+ 1' 14"
8	Tom Pidcock (GBR)	INEOS Grenadiers	+ 2' 52"
9	Kévin Vauquelin (FRA)	Arkéa–B&B Hotels	+ 2' 52"
10	Romain Grégoire (FRA)	Groupama–FDJ	+ 2' 52"

General classification after Stage 5
Rank	Rider	Team	Time
1	Jonas Vingegaard (DEN)	Visma–Lease a Bike	18h 34' 45"
2	Juan Ayuso (ESP)	UAE Team Emirates	+ 54"
3	Jai Hindley (AUS)	Bora–Hansgrohe	+ 1' 20"
4	Thymen Arensman (NED)	INEOS Grenadiers	+ 1' 29"
5	Ben O'Connor (AUS)	Decathlon–AG2R La Mondiale	+ 1' 32"
6	Isaac del Toro (MEX)	UAE Team Emirates	+ 1' 34"
7	Cian Uijtdebroeks (BEL)	Visma–Lease a Bike	+ 2' 12"
8	Kévin Vauquelin (FRA)	Arkéa–B&B Hotels	+ 2' 54"
9	Antonio Tiberi (ITA)	Team Bahrain Victorious	+ 2' 57"
10	Romain Grégoire (FRA)	Groupama–FDJ	+ 3' 02"

=== Stage 6 ===
9 March 2024 – Sassoferrato to Cagli, 180 km (110 mi)

Stage 6 Result
Rank	Rider	Team	Time
1	Jonas Vingegaard (DEN)	Visma–Lease a Bike	4h 31' 57"
2	Juan Ayuso (ESP)	UAE Team Emirates	+ 26"
3	Jai Hindley (AUS)	Bora–Hansgrohe	+ 26"
4	Isaac del Toro (MEX)	UAE Team Emirates	+ 36"
5	Tom Pidcock (GBR)	INEOS Grenadiers	+ 42"
6	Ben O'Connor (AUS)	Decathlon–AG2R La Mondiale	+ 42"
7	Lennard Kämna (GER)	Bora–Hansgrohe	+ 46"
8	Thymen Arensman (NED)	INEOS Grenadiers	+ 46"
9	Cian Uijtdebroeks (BEL)	Visma–Lease a Bike	+ 48"
10	Wout Poels (NED)	Team Bahrain Victorious	+ 1' 14"

General classification after Stage 6
Rank	Rider	Team	Time
1	Jonas Vingegaard (DEN)	Visma–Lease a Bike	23h 06' 32"
2	Juan Ayuso (ESP)	UAE Team Emirates	+ 1' 24"
3	Jai Hindley (AUS)	Bora–Hansgrohe	+ 1' 52"
4	Isaac del Toro (MEX)	UAE Team Emirates	+ 2' 20"
5	Ben O'Connor (AUS)	Decathlon–AG2R La Mondiale	+ 2' 24"
6	Thymen Arensman (NED)	INEOS Grenadiers	+ 2' 25"
7	Cian Uijtdebroeks (BEL)	Visma–Lease a Bike	+ 3' 10"
8	Lennard Kämna (GER)	Bora–Hansgrohe	+ 4' 02"
9	Tom Pidcock (GBR)	INEOS Grenadiers	+ 4' 05"
10	Kévin Vauquelin (FRA)	Arkéa–B&B Hotels	+ 4' 24"

=== Stage 7 ===
10 March 2024 – San Benedetto del Tronto to San Benedetto del Tronto, 154 km (96 mi)

Stage 7 Result
Rank	Rider	Team	Time
1	Jonathan Milan (ITA)	Lidl–Trek	3h 15' 51"
2	Alexander Kristoff (NOR)	Uno-X Mobility	+ 0"
3	Davide Cimolai (ITA)	Movistar Team	+ 0"
4	Jasper Philipsen (BEL)	Alpecin–Deceuninck	+ 0"
5	Stanisław Aniołkowski (POL)	Cofidis	+ 0"
6	Amaury Capiot (BEL)	Arkéa–B&B Hotels	+ 0"
7	Andrea Vendrame (ITA)	Decathlon–AG2R La Mondiale	+ 0"
8	Giovanni Lonardi (ITA)	Polti–Kometa	+ 0"
9	Clément Venturini (FRA)	Arkéa–B&B Hotels	+ 0"
10	Enrico Zanoncello (ITA)	VF Group–Bardiani–CSF–Faizanè	+ 0"

General classification after Stage 7
Rank	Rider	Team	Time
1	Jonas Vingegaard (DEN)	Visma–Lease a Bike	26h 22' 23"
2	Juan Ayuso (ESP)	UAE Team Emirates	+ 1' 24"
3	Jai Hindley (AUS)	Bora–Hansgrohe	+ 1' 52"
4	Isaac del Toro (MEX)	UAE Team Emirates	+ 2' 20"
5	Ben O'Connor (AUS)	Decathlon–AG2R La Mondiale	+ 2' 24"
6	Thymen Arensman (NED)	INEOS Grenadiers	+ 2' 25"
7	Cian Uijtdebroeks (BEL)	Visma–Lease a Bike	+ 3' 10"
8	Lennard Kämna (GER)	Bora–Hansgrohe	+ 4' 02"
9	Tom Pidcock (GBR)	INEOS Grenadiers	+ 4' 05"
10	Kévin Vauquelin (FRA)	Arkéa–B&B Hotels	+ 4' 24"

== Classification leadership table ==
Classification leadership by stage
Stage	Winner	General classification	Points classification	Mountains classification	Young rider classification	Team classification
1	Juan Ayuso	Juan Ayuso	Juan Ayuso	not awarded	Juan Ayuso	UAE Team Emirates
2	Jasper Philipsen	Juan Ayuso	Juan Ayuso	Davide Bais	Juan Ayuso	UAE Team Emirates
3	Phil Bauhaus	Juan Ayuso	Jonathan Milan	Richard Carapaz	Juan Ayuso	UAE Team Emirates
4	Jonathan Milan	Jonathan Milan	Jonathan Milan	Davide Bais	Jonathan Milan	UAE Team Emirates
5	Jonas Vingegaard	Jonas Vingegaard	Jonathan Milan	Jonas Vingegaard	Juan Ayuso	UAE Team Emirates
6	Jonas Vingegaard	Jonas Vingegaard	Juan Ayuso	Jonas Vingegaard	Juan Ayuso	UAE Team Emirates
7	Jonathan Milan	Jonas Vingegaard	Jonathan Milan	Jonas Vingegaard	Juan Ayuso	UAE Team Emirates
Final		Jonas Vingegaard	Jonathan Milan	Jonas Vingegaard	Juan Ayuso	UAE Team Emirates

== Classification standings ==
Legend
Denotes the winner of the general classification	Denotes the winner of the mountains classification
Denotes the winner of the points classification	Denotes the winner of the young rider classification

=== General classification ===
Final general classification (1–10)
Rank	Rider	Team	Time
1	Jonas Vingegaard (DEN)	Visma–Lease a Bike	26h 22' 23"
2	Juan Ayuso (ESP)	UAE Team Emirates	+ 1' 24"
3	Jai Hindley (AUS)	Bora–Hansgrohe	+ 1' 52"
4	Isaac del Toro (MEX)	UAE Team Emirates	+ 2' 20"
5	Ben O'Connor (AUS)	Decathlon–AG2R La Mondiale	+ 2' 24"
6	Thymen Arensman (NED)	INEOS Grenadiers	+ 2' 25"
7	Cian Uijtdebroeks (BEL)	Visma–Lease a Bike	+ 3' 10"
8	Lennard Kämna (GER)	Bora–Hansgrohe	+ 4' 02"
9	Tom Pidcock (GBR)	INEOS Grenadiers	+ 4' 05"
10	Kévin Vauquelin (FRA)	Arkéa–B&B Hotels	+ 4' 24"

=== Points classification ===
Final points classification (1–10)
Rank	Rider	Team	Points
1	Jonathan Milan (ITA)	Lidl–Trek	44
2	Juan Ayuso (ESP)	UAE Team Emirates	33
3	Jasper Philipsen (BEL)	Alpecin–Deceuninck	29
4	Jonas Vingegaard (DEN)	Visma–Lease a Bike	26
5	Jai Hindley (AUS)	Bora–Hansgrohe	16
6	Filippo Ganna (ITA)	INEOS Grenadiers	15
7	Kévin Vauquelin (FRA)	Arkéa–B&B Hotels	13
8	Ben O'Connor (AUS)	Decathlon–AG2R La Mondiale	12
9	Amaury Capiot (BEL)	Arkéa–B&B Hotels	12
10	Isaac del Toro (MEX)	UAE Team Emirates	11

=== Mountains classification ===
Final mountains classification (1–10)
Rank	Rider	Team	Points
1	Jonas Vingegaard (DEN)	Visma–Lease a Bike	30
2	Juan Ayuso (ESP)	UAE Team Emirates	17
3	Isaac del Toro (MEX)	UAE Team Emirates	15
4	Ben Healy (IRL)	EF Education–EasyPost	9
5	Jai Hindley (AUS)	Bora–Hansgrohe	9
6	Andreas Leknessund (NOR)	Uno-X Mobility	7
7	Davide Bais (ITA)	Polti–Kometa	7
8	Lorenzo Quartucci (ITA)	Team Corratec–Vini Fantini	6
9	Antonio Tiberi (ITA)	Team Bahrain Victorious	5
10	Alexander Kamp (DEN)	Tudor Pro Cycling Team	5

=== Young rider classification ===
Final young rider classification (1–10)
Rank	Rider	Team	Time
1	Juan Ayuso (ESP)	UAE Team Emirates	26h 23' 47"
2	Isaac del Toro (MEX)	UAE Team Emirates	+ 56"
3	Thymen Arensman (NED)	INEOS Grenadiers	+ 1' 01"
4	Cian Uijtdebroeks (BEL)	Visma–Lease a Bike	+ 1' 46"
5	Tom Pidcock (GBR)	INEOS Grenadiers	+ 2' 41"
6	Kévin Vauquelin (FRA)	Arkéa–B&B Hotels	+ 3' 00"
7	Romain Grégoire (FRA)	Groupama–FDJ	+ 4' 01"
8	Magnus Sheffield (USA)	INEOS Grenadiers	+ 4' 18"
9	Davide Piganzoli (ITA)	Polti–Kometa	+ 4' 29"
10	Filippo Zana (ITA)	Team Jayco–AlUla	+ 4' 36"

=== Team classification ===
Final team classification (1–10)
Rank	Team	Time
1	(United Arab Emirates) UAE Team Emirates	79h 16' 40"
2	(United Kingdom) INEOS Grenadiers	+ 2' 09"
3	(Germany) Bora–Hansgrohe	+ 6' 33"
4	(Spain) Movistar Team	+ 7' 44"
5	(Kazakhstan) Astana Qazaqstan Team	+ 13' 09"
6	(Netherlands) Visma–Lease a Bike	+ 18' 07"
7	Team Bahrain Victorious	+ 24' 31"
8	(France) Arkéa–B&B Hotels	+ 28' 20"
9	(France) Decathlon–AG2R La Mondiale	+ 28' 20"
10	(United States) EF Education–EasyPost	+ 28' 56"
