= 2024 Paris–Nice =

French cycling race

2024 UCI World Tour, race 6 of 35

Race details
- Dates: 3–10 March 2024
- Stages: 8
- Distance: 1,219.2 km (757.6 mi)
- Winning time: 27h 50' 23"

Results
Jersey awarded to the overall winner	Winner	Matteo Jorgenson (USA)	(Visma–Lease a Bike)
	Second	Remco Evenepoel (BEL)	(Soudal–Quick-Step)
	Third	Brandon McNulty (USA)	(UAE Team Emirates)
Jersey awarded to the points classification winner	Points	Remco Evenepoel (BEL)	(Soudal–Quick-Step)
Jersey awarded to the mountains classification winner	Mountains	Remco Evenepoel (BEL)	(Soudal–Quick-Step)
Jersey awarded to the youth classification winner	Youth	Matteo Jorgenson (USA)	(Visma–Lease a Bike)
	Team	(United Arab Emirates) UAE Team Emirates	

The 2024 Paris–Nice was a road cycling stage race that started on 3 March and finished on 10 March in France. It was the 82nd edition of Paris–Nice and the sixth race of the 2024 UCI World Tour.

== Teams ==
All 18 UCI WorldTeams and four UCI ProTeams made up the 22 teams that participated in the race.

UCI WorldTeams

- Alpecin–Deceuninck
- Arkéa–B&B Hotels
- Astana Qazaqstan Team
- Bora–Hansgrohe
- Cofidis
- Decathlon–AG2R La Mondiale
- EF Education–EasyPost
- Groupama–FDJ
- Ineos Grenadiers
- Intermarché–Wanty
- Lidl–Trek
- Movistar Team
- Soudal–Quick-Step
- Team Bahrain Victorious
- Team dsm–firmenich PostNL
- Team Jayco–AlUla
- UAE Team Emirates
- Visma–Lease a Bike

UCI ProTeams

- Israel–Premier Tech
- Lotto–Dstny
- Team TotalEnergies
- Tudor Pro Cycling Team

== Route ==
Stage characteristics and winners
Stage	Date	Course	Distance	Type	Stage winner
1	3 March	Les Mureaux to Les Mureaux	157.7 km (98.0 mi)	Hilly stage	Olav Kooij (NED)
2	4 March	Thoiry to Montargis	179 km (111 mi)	Flat stage	Arvid de Kleijn (NED)
3	5 March	Auxerre to Auxerre	26.9 km (16.7 mi)	Team time trial	(United Arab Emirates) UAE Team Emirates
4	6 March	Chalon-sur-Saône to Mont Brouilly	183 km (114 mi)	Mountain stage	Santiago Buitrago (COL)
5	7 March	Saint-Sauveur-de-Montagut to Sisteron	193.5 km (120.2 mi)	Hilly stage	Olav Kooij (NED)
6	8 March	Sisteron to La Colle-sur-Loup	198.2 km (123.2 mi)	Hilly stage	Mattias Skjelmose (DEN)
7	9 March	Nice to ~~Auron~~ Madone d'Utelle	~~173 km (107 mi)~~ 104 km (65 mi)	Mountain stage	Aleksandr Vlasov
8	10 March	Nice to Nice	109.3 km (67.9 mi)	Medium mountain stage	Remco Evenepoel (BEL)
Total			1,219.2 km (757.6 mi)		

== Stages ==
=== Stage 1 ===
3 March 2024 — Les Mureaux to Les Mureaux, 157.7 km (98.0 mi)

Stage 1 Result
Rank	Rider	Team	Time
1	Olav Kooij (NED)	Visma–Lease a Bike	3h 36' 28"
2	Mads Pedersen (DEN)	Lidl–Trek	+ 0"
3	Laurence Pithie (NZL)	Groupama–FDJ	+ 0"
4	Nils Eekhoff (NED)	Team dsm–firmenich PostNL	+ 0"
5	Madis Mihkels (EST)	Intermarché–Wanty	+ 0"
6	Michael Matthews (AUS)	Team Jayco–AlUla	+ 0"
7	Matteo Trentin (ITA)	Tudor Pro Cycling Team	+ 0"
8	Mattias Skjelmose (DEN)	Lidl–Trek	+ 0"
9	Sandy Dujardin (FRA)	Team TotalEnergies	+ 0"
10	Kaden Groves (AUS)	Alpecin–Deceuninck	+ 0"

General classification after Stage 1
Rank	Rider	Team	Time
1	Olav Kooij (NED)	Visma–Lease a Bike	3h 36' 18"
2	Mads Pedersen (DEN)	Lidl–Trek	+ 4"
3	Matteo Jorgenson (USA)	Visma–Lease a Bike	+ 4"
4	Laurence Pithie (NZL)	Groupama–FDJ	+ 6"
5	Remco Evenepoel (BEL)	Soudal–Quick-Step	+ 6"
6	Egan Bernal (COL)	Ineos Grenadiers	+ 8"
7	Nils Eekhoff (NED)	Team dsm–firmenich PostNL	+ 10"
8	Madis Mihkels (EST)	Intermarché–Wanty	+ 10"
9	Michael Matthews (AUS)	Team Jayco–AlUla	+ 10"
10	Matteo Trentin (ITA)	Tudor Pro Cycling Team	+ 10"

=== Stage 2 ===
4 March 2024 – Thoiry to Montargis, 177.6 km (110.4 mi)

Stage 2 Result
Rank	Rider	Team	Time
1	Arvid de Kleijn (NED)	Tudor Pro Cycling Team	4h 41' 02"
2	Laurence Pithie (NZL)	Groupama–FDJ	+ 0"
3	Dylan Groenewegen (NED)	Team Jayco–AlUla	+ 0"
4	Danny van Poppel (NED)	Bora–Hansgrohe	+ 0"
5	Gerben Thijssen (BEL)	Intermarché–Wanty	+ 0"
6	Sam Bennett (IRL)	Decathlon–AG2R La Mondiale	+ 0"
7	Dries Van Gestel (BEL)	Team TotalEnergies	+ 0"
8	Mads Pedersen (DEN)	Lidl–Trek	+ 0"
9	Pascal Ackermann (GER)	Israel–Premier Tech	+ 0"
10	Matteo Sobrero (ITA)	Bora–Hansgrohe	+ 0"

General classification after Stage 2
Rank	Rider	Team	Time
1	Laurence Pithie (NZL)	Groupama–FDJ	8h 17' 20"
2	Mads Pedersen (DEN)	Lidl–Trek	+ 0"
3	Olav Kooij (NED)	Visma–Lease a Bike	+ 0"
4	Matteo Jorgenson (USA)	Visma–Lease a Bike	+ 4"
5	Remco Evenepoel (BEL)	Soudal–Quick-Step	+ 6"
6	Egan Bernal (COL)	Ineos Grenadiers	+ 8"
7	Mattias Skjelmose (DEN)	Lidl–Trek	+ 8"
8	Kaden Groves (AUS)	Alpecin–Deceuninck	+ 10"
9	Sam Bennett (IRL)	Decathlon–AG2R La Mondiale	+ 10"
10	Jon Barrenetxea (ESP)	Movistar Team	+ 10"

=== Stage 3 ===
5 March 2024 – Auxerre to Auxerre, 26.9 km (16.7 mi) (TTT)

Stage 3 Result
Rank	Team	Time
1	(United Arab Emirates) UAE Team Emirates	31' 23"
2	(Australia) Team Jayco–AlUla	+ 15"
3	(United States) EF Education–EasyPost	+ 20"
4	(Belgium) Soudal–Quick-Step	+ 22"
5	(United Kingdom) Ineos Grenadiers	+ 22"
6	(Netherlands) Visma–Lease a Bike	+ 38"
7	(Kazakhstan) Astana Qazaqstan Team	+ 39"
8	(France) Decathlon–AG2R La Mondiale	+ 39"
9	(France) Cofidis	+ 47"
10	Team Bahrain Victorious	+ 48"

General classification after Stage 3
Rank	Rider	Team	Time
1	Brandon McNulty (USA)	UAE Team Emirates	8h 48' 53"
2	Finn Fisher-Black (NZL)	UAE Team Emirates	+ 0"
3	João Almeida (POR)	UAE Team Emirates	+ 0"
4	Jay Vine (AUS)	UAE Team Emirates	+ 0"
5	Michael Matthews (AUS)	Team Jayco–AlUla	+ 15"
6	Chris Harper (AUS)	Team Jayco–AlUla	+ 15"
7	Luke Plapp (AUS)	Team Jayco–AlUla	+ 15"
8	Remco Evenepoel (BEL)	Soudal–Quick-Step	+ 18"
9	Owain Doull (GBR)	EF Education–EasyPost	+ 20"
10	Egan Bernal (COL)	Ineos Grenadiers	+ 20"

=== Stage 4 ===
6 March 2024 – Chalon-sur-Saône to Mont Brouilly, 183 km (114 mi)

Stage 4 Result
Rank	Rider	Team	Time
1	Santiago Buitrago (COL)	Team Bahrain Victorious	4h 25' 52"
2	Luke Plapp (AUS)	Team Jayco–AlUla	+ 10"
3	Mattias Skjelmose (DEN)	Lidl–Trek	+ 37"
4	Remco Evenepoel (BEL)	Soudal–Quick-Step	+ 37"
5	Egan Bernal (COL)	Ineos Grenadiers	+ 39"
6	Felix Gall (AUT)	Decathlon–AG2R La Mondiale	+ 39"
7	Primož Roglič (SLO)	Bora–Hansgrohe	+ 39"
8	Matteo Jorgenson (USA)	Visma–Lease a Bike	+ 39"
9	Harold Tejada (COL)	Astana Qazaqstan Team	+ 43"
10	Brandon McNulty (USA)	UAE Team Emirates	+ 46"

General classification after Stage 4
Rank	Rider	Team	Time
1	Luke Plapp (AUS)	Team Jayco–AlUla	13h 15' 04"
2	Santiago Buitrago (COL)	Team Bahrain Victorious	+ 13"
3	Brandon McNulty (USA)	UAE Team Emirates	+ 27"
4	João Almeida (POR)	UAE Team Emirates	+ 29"
5	Remco Evenepoel (BEL)	Soudal–Quick-Step	+ 30"
6	Egan Bernal (COL)	Ineos Grenadiers	+ 40"
7	Chris Harper (AUS)	Team Jayco–AlUla	+ 46"
8	Matteo Jorgenson (USA)	Visma–Lease a Bike	+ 52"
9	Rigoberto Uran (COL)	EF Education–EasyPost	+ 54"
10	Carlos Rodríguez (ESP)	Ineos Grenadiers	+ 1' 02"

=== Stage 5 ===
7 March 2024 – Saint-Sauveur-de-Montagut to Sisteron, 193.5 km (120.2 mi)

Stage 5 Result
Rank	Rider	Team	Time
1	Olav Kooij (NED)	Visma–Lease a Bike	4h 23' 44"
2	Mads Pedersen (DEN)	Lidl–Trek	+ 0"
3	Pascal Ackermann (GER)	Israel–Premier Tech	+ 0"
4	Sam Bennett (IRL)	Decathlon–AG2R La Mondiale	+ 0"
5	Danny van Poppel (NED)	Bora–Hansgrohe	+ 0"
6	Tobias Lund Andresen (DEN)	Team dsm–firmenich PostNL	+ 0"
7	Matteo Trentin (ITA)	Tudor Pro Cycling Team	+ 0"
8	Laurence Pithie (NZL)	Groupama–FDJ	+ 0"
9	Madis Mihkels (EST)	Intermarché–Wanty	+ 0"
10	Dušan Rajović (SRB)	Team Bahrain Victorious	+ 0"

General classification after Stage 5
Rank	Rider	Team	Time
1	Luke Plapp (AUS)	Team Jayco–AlUla	17h 38' 48"
2	Santiago Buitrago (COL)	Team Bahrain Victorious	+ 13"
3	Brandon McNulty (USA)	UAE Team Emirates	+ 27"
4	João Almeida (POR)	UAE Team Emirates	+ 29"
5	Remco Evenepoel (BEL)	Soudal–Quick-Step	+ 30"
6	Egan Bernal (COL)	Ineos Grenadiers	+ 40"
7	Chris Harper (AUS)	Team Jayco–AlUla	+ 46"
8	Matteo Jorgenson (USA)	Visma–Lease a Bike	+ 52"
9	Rigoberto Uran (COL)	EF Education–EasyPost	+ 54"
10	Carlos Rodríguez (ESP)	Ineos Grenadiers	+ 1' 02"

=== Stage 6 ===
8 March 2024 – Sisteron to La Colle-sur-Loup, 198.2 km (123.2 mi)

Stage 6 Result
Rank	Rider	Team	Time
1	Mattias Skjelmose (DEN)	Lidl–Trek	4h 36' 51"
2	Brandon McNulty (USA)	UAE Team Emirates	+ 0"
3	Matteo Jorgenson (USA)	Visma–Lease a Bike	+ 0"
4	Remco Evenepoel (BEL)	Soudal–Quick-Step	+ 52"
5	Harold Tejada (COL)	Astana Qazaqstan Team	+ 53"
6	Aurélien Paret-Peintre (FRA)	Decathlon–AG2R La Mondiale	+ 53"
7	Felix Gall (AUT)	Decathlon–AG2R La Mondiale	+ 53"
8	Wilco Kelderman (NED)	Visma–Lease a Bike	+ 53"
9	Primož Roglič (SLO)	Bora–Hansgrohe	+ 53"
10	Egan Bernal (COL)	Ineos Grenadiers	+ 53"

General classification after Stage 6
Rank	Rider	Team	Time
1	Brandon McNulty (USA)	UAE Team Emirates	22h 15' 58"
2	Matteo Jorgenson (USA)	Visma–Lease a Bike	+ 23"
3	Luke Plapp (AUS)	Team Jayco–AlUla	+ 34"
4	Mattias Skjelmose (DEN)	Lidl–Trek	+ 54"
5	Remco Evenepoel (BEL)	Soudal–Quick-Step	+ 1' 03"
6	Egan Bernal (COL)	Ineos Grenadiers	+ 1' 14"
7	João Almeida (POR)	UAE Team Emirates	+ 1' 30"
8	Felix Gall (AUT)	Decathlon–AG2R La Mondiale	+ 1' 36"
9	Harold Tejada (COL)	Astana Qazaqstan Team	+ 1' 37"
10	Wilco Kelderman (NED)	Visma–Lease a Bike	+ 1' 39"

=== Stage 7 ===
9 March 2024 – Nice to ~~Auron~~ Madone d'Utelle, 104 km (65 mi)

Stage 7 Result
Rank	Rider	Team	Time
1	Aleksandr Vlasov	Bora–Hansgrohe	2h 44' 03"
2	Remco Evenepoel (BEL)	Soudal–Quick-Step	+ 8"
3	Primož Roglič (SLO)	Bora–Hansgrohe	+ 8"
4	Mattias Skjelmose (DEN)	Lidl–Trek	+ 8"
5	Matteo Jorgenson (USA)	Visma–Lease a Bike	+ 8"
6	Santiago Buitrago (COL)	Team Bahrain Victorious	+ 13"
7	Brandon McNulty (USA)	UAE Team Emirates	+ 27"
8	Wilco Kelderman (NED)	Visma–Lease a Bike	+ 31"
9	Aurélien Paret-Peintre (FRA)	Decathlon–AG2R La Mondiale	+ 36"
10	Luke Plapp (AUS)	Team Jayco–AlUla	+ 40"

General classification after Stage 7
Rank	Rider	Team	Time
1	Brandon McNulty (USA)	UAE Team Emirates	25h 00' 28"
2	Matteo Jorgenson (USA)	Visma–Lease a Bike	+ 4"
3	Mattias Skjelmose (DEN)	Lidl–Trek	+ 35"
4	Remco Evenepoel (BEL)	Soudal–Quick-Step	+ 36"
5	Luke Plapp (AUS)	Team Jayco–AlUla	+ 47"
6	Primož Roglič (SLO)	Bora–Hansgrohe	+ 1' 21"
7	Egan Bernal (COL)	Ineos Grenadiers	+ 1' 42"
8	Wilco Kelderman (NED)	Visma–Lease a Bike	+ 1' 43"
9	Aurélien Paret-Peintre (FRA)	Decathlon–AG2R La Mondiale	+ 1' 53"
10	Aleksandr Vlasov	Bora–Hansgrohe	+ 2' 05"

=== Stage 8 ===
10 March 2024 – Nice to Nice, 109.3 km (67.9 mi)

Stage 8 Result
Rank	Rider	Team	Time
1	Remco Evenepoel (BEL)	Soudal–Quick-Step	2h 50' 03"
2	Matteo Jorgenson (USA)	Visma–Lease a Bike	+ 0"
3	Aleksandr Vlasov	Bora–Hansgrohe	+ 50"
4	Mattias Skjelmose (DEN)	Lidl–Trek	+ 1' 39"
5	Brandon McNulty (USA)	UAE Team Emirates	+ 1' 39"
6	Samuele Battistella (ITA)	Astana Qazaqstan Team	+ 2' 13"
7	Michael Storer (AUS)	Tudor Pro Cycling Team	+ 2' 13"
8	Felix Gall (AUT)	Decathlon–AG2R La Mondiale	+ 2' 13"
9	Egan Bernal (COL)	Ineos Grenadiers	+ 2' 13"
10	Luke Plapp (AUS)	Team Jayco–AlUla	+ 2' 13"

General classification after Stage 8
Rank	Rider	Team	Time
1	Matteo Jorgenson (USA)	Visma–Lease a Bike	27h 50' 23"
2	Remco Evenepoel (BEL)	Soudal–Quick-Step	+ 30"
3	Brandon McNulty (USA)	UAE Team Emirates	+ 1' 47"
4	Mattias Skjelmose (DEN)	Lidl–Trek	+ 2' 22"
5	Aleksandr Vlasov	Bora–Hansgrohe	+ 2' 57"
6	Luke Plapp (AUS)	Team Jayco–AlUla	+ 3' 08"
7	Egan Bernal (COL)	Ineos Grenadiers	+ 4' 03"
8	Wilco Kelderman (NED)	Visma–Lease a Bike	+ 4' 04"
9	Felix Gall (AUT)	Decathlon–AG2R La Mondiale	+ 4' 35"
10	Primož Roglič (SLO)	Bora–Hansgrohe	+ 5' 33"

== Classification leadership table ==
Classification leadership by stage
Stage	Winner	General classification	Points classification	Mountains classification	Young rider classification	Team classification	Combativity award
1	Olav Kooij	Olav Kooij	Olav Kooij	Jonas Rutsch	Olav Kooij	Visma–Lease a Bike	Jonas Rutsch
2	Arvid de Kleijn	Laurence Pithie	Laurence Pithie	Mathieu Burgaudeau	Laurence Pithie	Visma–Lease a Bike	Mathieu Burgaudeau
3	UAE Team Emirates	Brandon McNulty	Laurence Pithie	Mathieu Burgaudeau	Finn Fisher-Black	UAE Team Emirates	not awarded
4	Santiago Buitrago	Luke Plapp	Laurence Pithie	Mathieu Burgaudeau	Luke Plapp	Ineos Grenadiers	Christian Scaroni
5	Olav Kooij	Luke Plapp	Mads Pedersen	Mathieu Burgaudeau	Luke Plapp	Ineos Grenadiers	Pierre Latour
6	Mattias Skjelmose	Brandon McNulty	Mads Pedersen	Mathieu Burgaudeau	Matteo Jorgenson	UAE Team Emirates	Mads Pedersen
7	Aleksandr Vlasov	Brandon McNulty	Mads Pedersen	Mathieu Burgaudeau	Matteo Jorgenson	UAE Team Emirates	Johan Jacobs
8	Remco Evenepoel	Matteo Jorgenson	Remco Evenepoel	Remco Evenepoel	Matteo Jorgenson	UAE Team Emirates	Remco Evenepoel
Final		Matteo Jorgenson	Remco Evenepoel	Remco Evenepoel	Matteo Jorgenson	UAE Team Emirates	Not awarded

== Classification standings ==
Legend
Denotes the winner of the general classification	Denotes the winner of the mountains classification
Denotes the winner of the points classification	Denotes the winner of the young rider classification
Denotes the winner of the team classification	Denotes the winner of the combativity award

=== General classification ===
Final general classification (1–10)
Rank	Rider	Team	Time
1	Matteo Jorgenson (USA)	Visma–Lease a Bike	27h 50' 23"
2	Remco Evenepoel (BEL)	Soudal–Quick-Step	+ 30"
3	Brandon McNulty (USA)	UAE Team Emirates	+ 1' 47"
4	Mattias Skjelmose (DEN)	Lidl–Trek	+ 2' 22"
5	Aleksandr Vlasov	Bora–Hansgrohe	+ 2' 57"
6	Luke Plapp (AUS)	Team Jayco–AlUla	+ 3' 08"
7	Egan Bernal (COL)	Ineos Grenadiers	+ 4' 03"
8	Wilco Kelderman (NED)	Visma–Lease a Bike	+ 4' 04"
9	Felix Gall (AUT)	Decathlon–AG2R La Mondiale	+ 4' 35"
10	Primož Roglič (SLO)	Bora–Hansgrohe	+ 5' 33"

=== Points classification ===
Final points classification (1–10)
Rank	Rider	Team	Points
1	Remco Evenepoel (BEL)	Soudal–Quick-Step	69
2	Mattias Skjelmose (DEN)	Lidl–Trek	61
3	Matteo Jorgenson (USA)	Visma–Lease a Bike	61
4	Mads Pedersen (DEN)	Lidl–Trek	60
5	Laurence Pithie (NZL)	Groupama–FDJ	56
6	Olav Kooij (NED)	Visma–Lease a Bike	50
7	Danny van Poppel (NED)	Bora–Hansgrohe	44
8	Sam Bennett (IRL)	Decathlon–AG2R La Mondiale	32
9	Aleksandr Vlasov	Bora–Hansgrohe	29
10	Brandon McNulty (USA)	UAE Team Emirates	27

=== Mountains classification ===
Final mountains classification (1–10)
Rank	Rider	Team	Points
1	Remco Evenepoel (BEL)	Soudal–Quick-Step	47
2	Mathieu Burgaudeau (FRA)	Team TotalEnergies	44
3	Christian Scaroni (ITA)	Astana Qazaqstan Team	44
4	Aleksandr Vlasov	Bora–Hansgrohe	41
5	Matteo Jorgenson (USA)	Visma–Lease a Bike	27
6	Victor Campenaerts (BEL)	Lotto–Dstny	16
7	Mattias Skjelmose (DEN)	Lidl–Trek	14
8	Jonas Rutsch (GER)	EF Education–EasyPost	13
9	Luke Plapp (AUS)	Team Jayco–AlUla	11
10	Primož Roglič (SLO)	Bora–Hansgrohe	10

=== Young rider classification ===
Final young rider classification (1–10)
Rank	Rider	Team	Time
1	Matteo Jorgenson (USA)	Visma–Lease a Bike	27h 50' 23"
2	Remco Evenepoel (BEL)	Soudal–Quick-Step	+ 30"
3	Mattias Skjelmose (DEN)	Lidl–Trek	+ 2' 22"
4	Luke Plapp (AUS)	Team Jayco–AlUla	+ 3' 08"
5	Ewen Costiou (FRA)	Arkéa–B&B Hotels	+ 16' 25"
6	Ilan Van Wilder (BEL)	Soudal–Quick-Step	+ 24' 11"
7	Carlos Rodríguez (ESP)	Ineos Grenadiers	+ 39' 21"
8	Jon Barrenetxea (ESP)	Movistar Team	+ 57' 23"
9	Jordan Jegat (FRA)	Team TotalEnergies	+ 1h 01' 12"
10	Finn Fisher-Black (NZL)	UAE Team Emirates	+ 1h 06' 36"

=== Teams classification ===
Final team classification (1–10)
Rank	Team	Time
1	(United Arab Emirates) UAE Team Emirates	83h 51' 18"
2	(Netherlands) Visma–Lease a Bike	+ 7' 45"
3	(Belgium) Soudal–Quick-Step	+ 8' 18"
4	(Germany) Bora–Hansgrohe	+ 22' 49"
5	(United Kingdom) Ineos Grenadiers	+ 25' 19"
6	(France) Decathlon–AG2R La Mondiale	+ 38' 22"
7	Team Bahrain Victorious	+ 1h 15' 26"
8	(Spain) Movistar Team	+ 1h 15' 47"
9	(Kazakhstan) Astana Qazaqstan Team	+ 1h 29' 34"
10	(United States) Lidl–Trek	+ 1h 32' 40"
