= 2024 Tour de Pologne =

2024 UCI World Tour, race 27 of 35
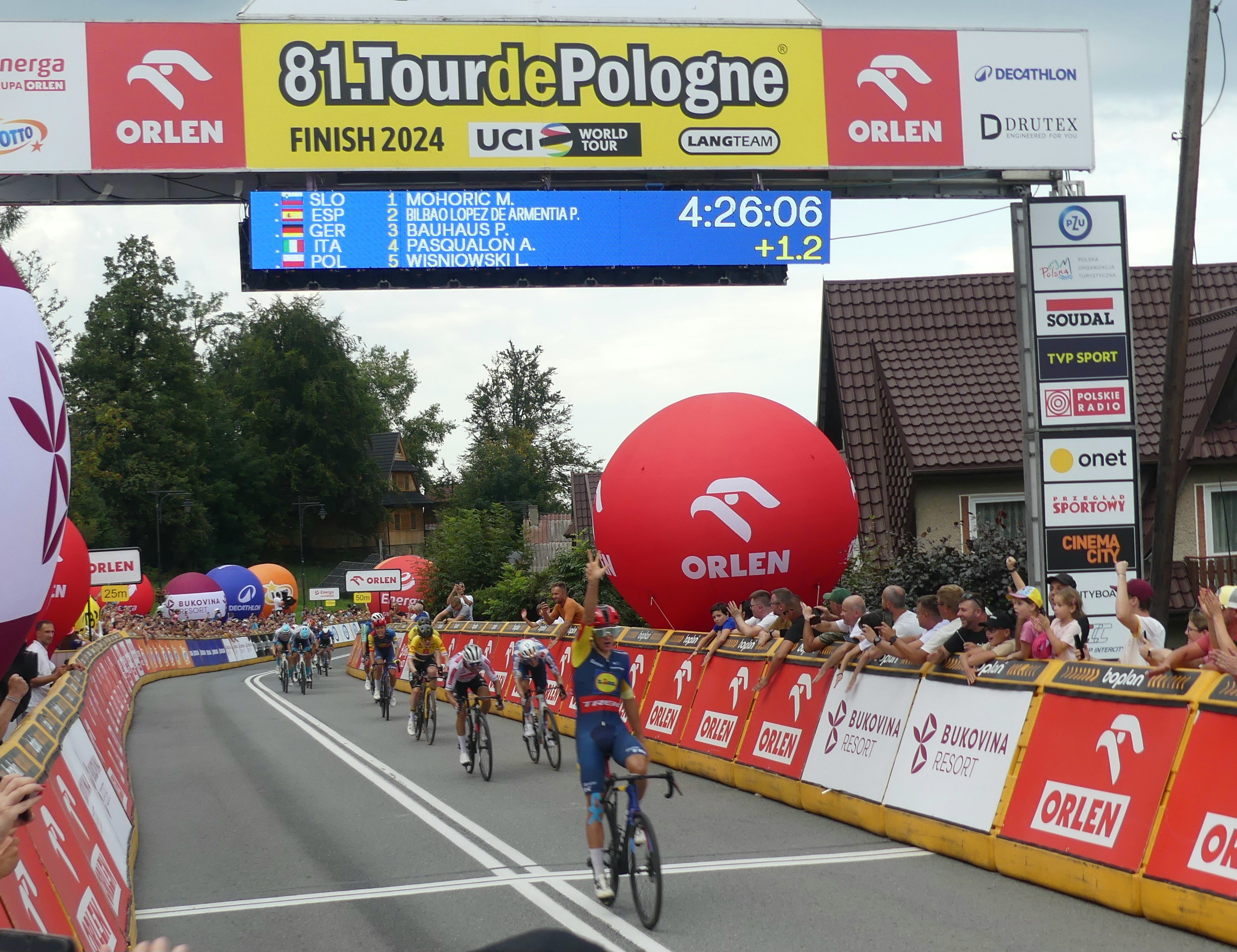

Race details
- Dates: 12–18 August 2024
- Stages: 7
- Distance: 1,049.3 km (652.0 mi)
- Winning time: 24h 26' 22"

Results
Jersey awarded to the overall winner	Winner	Jonas Vingegaard (DEN)	(Visma–Lease a Bike)
	Second	Diego Ulissi (ITA)	(UAE Team Emirates)
	Third	Wilco Kelderman (NED)	(Visma–Lease a Bike)
Jersey awarded to the mountains classification winner	Mountains	Michał Paluta (POL)	(Poland)
Jersey awarded to the sprints classification winner	Sprints	Diego Ulissi (ITA)	(UAE Team Emirates)
Jersey awarded to the combativity classification winner	Combativity	Norbert Banaszek (POL)	(Poland)
	Team	(United Arab Emirates) UAE Team Emirates	

The 2024 Tour de Pologne was the 81st edition of the Tour de Pologne road cycling stage race, and the 27th event of the men's 2024 UCI World Tour. The race began on 12 August in Wrocław and finished on 18 August in Kraków.

== Teams ==
All eighteen UCI WorldTeams, three UCI ProTeams, and the Polish national team made up the twenty-two teams that participated in the race.

UCI WorldTeams

- Alpecin–Deceuninck
- Arkéa–B&B Hotels
- Astana Qazaqstan Team
- Cofidis
- Decathlon–AG2R La Mondiale
- EF Education–EasyPost
- Groupama–FDJ
- Ineos Grenadiers
- Intermarché–Wanty
- Lidl–Trek
- Movistar Team
- Red Bull–Bora–Hansgrohe
- Soudal–Quick-Step
- Team Bahrain Victorious
- Team dsm–firmenich PostNL
- Team Jayco–AlUla
- UAE Team Emirates
- Visma–Lease a Bike

UCI ProTeams

- Israel–Premier Tech
- Q36.5 Pro Cycling Team
- Tudor Pro Cycling Team

National Teams

- Poland

== Schedule ==
Stage characteristics and winners
Stage	Date	Course	Distance	Type	Stage winner
1	12 August	Wrocław to Karpacz	159.3 km (99.0 mi)	Hilly stage	Thibau Nys (BEL)
2	13 August	Mysłakowice to Karpacz	15.4 km (9.6 mi)	Individual time trial	Tim Wellens (BEL)
3	14 August	Wałbrzych to Duszniki-Zdrój	156.5 km (97.2 mi)	Hilly stage	Thibau Nys (BEL)
4	15 August	Kudowa-Zdrój to Prudnik	195.3 km (121.4 mi)	Flat stage	Olav Kooij (NED)
5	16 August	Katowice to Katowice	187.6 km (116.6 mi)	Hilly stage	Tim Merlier (BEL)
6	17 August	Wadowice to Bukowina Tatrzańska	183.2 km (113.8 mi)	Hilly stage	Thibau Nys (BEL)
7	18 August	Wieliczka to Kraków	152 km (94 mi)	Flat stage	Olav Kooij (NED)
Total			1,130.5 km (702.5 mi)		

== Stages ==
=== Stage 1 ===
12 August 2024 – Wrocław to Karpacz 159.3 km (99.0 mi)

Stage 1 Result
Rank	Rider	Team	Time
1	Thibau Nys (BEL)	Lidl–Trek	3h 37' 13"
2	Wilco Kelderman (NED)	Visma–Lease a Bike	+ 3"
3	Lukas Nerurkar (GBR)	EF Education–EasyPost	+ 3"
4	Jonas Vingegaard (DEN)	Visma–Lease a Bike	+ 6"
5	Matej Mohorič (SLO)	Team Bahrain Victorious	+ 6"
6	Diego Ulissi (ITA)	UAE Team Emirates	+ 6"
7	Romain Grégoire (FRA)	Groupama–FDJ	+ 6"
8	Jakob Fuglsang (DEN)	UAE Team Emirates	+ 6"
9	Rafał Majka (POL)	UAE Team Emirates	+ 9"
10	Nicola Conci (ITA)	Alpecin–Deceuninck	+ 9"

General classification after Stage 1
Rank	Rider	Team	Time
1	Thibau Nys (BEL)	Lidl–Trek	3h 37' 03"
2	Wilco Kelderman (NED)	Visma–Lease a Bike	+ 7"
3	Lukas Nerurkar (GBR)	EF Education–EasyPost	+ 9"
4	Jonas Vingegaard (DEN)	Visma–Lease a Bike	+ 16"
5	Matej Mohorič (SLO)	Team Bahrain Victorious	+ 16"
6	Diego Ulissi (ITA)	UAE Team Emirates	+ 16"
7	Romain Grégoire (FRA)	Groupama–FDJ	+ 16"
8	Jakob Fuglsang (DEN)	UAE Team Emirates	+ 16"
9	Rafał Majka (POL)	UAE Team Emirates	+ 19"
10	Nicola Conci (ITA)	Alpecin–Deceuninck	+ 19"

=== Stage 2 ===
13 August 2024 – Mysłakowice to Karpacz 15.4 km (9.6 mi) (ITT)

Stage 2 Result
Rank	Rider	Team	Time
1	Tim Wellens (BEL)	UAE Team Emirates	23' 59"
2	Jonas Vingegaard (DEN)	Visma–Lease a Bike	+ 9"
3	Felix Großschartner (AUT)	UAE Team Emirates	+ 15"
4	Oscar Onley (GBR)	Team dsm–firmenich PostNL	+ 15"
5	Maximilian Schachmann (GER)	Red Bull–Bora–Hansgrohe	+ 21"
6	Diego Ulissi (ITA)	UAE Team Emirates	+ 34"
7	Magnus Sheffield (USA)	Ineos Grenadiers	+ 39"
8	Raúl García Pierna (ESP)	Arkéa–B&B Hotels	+ 40"
9	Jan Christen (SUI)	UAE Team Emirates	+ 41"
10	Romain Grégoire (FRA)	Groupama–FDJ	+ 42"

General classification after Stage 2
Rank	Rider	Team	Time
1	Jonas Vingegaard (DEN)	Visma–Lease a Bike	4h 01' 27"
2	Wilco Kelderman (NED)	Visma–Lease a Bike	+ 24"
3	Diego Ulissi (ITA)	UAE Team Emirates	+ 25"
4	Romain Grégoire (FRA)	Groupama–FDJ	+ 33"
5	Magnus Sheffield (USA)	Ineos Grenadiers	+ 37"
6	Edoardo Zambanini (ITA)	Team Bahrain Victorious	+ 45"
7	Yannis Voisard (SUI)	Tudor Pro Cycling Team	+ 49"
8	Matej Mohorič (SLO)	Team Bahrain Victorious	+ 49"
9	Mikkel Frølich Honoré (DEN)	EF Education–EasyPost	+ 49"
10	Felix Großschartner (AUT)	UAE Team Emirates	+ 50"

=== Stage 3 ===
14 August 2024 – Wałbrzych to Duszniki-Zdrój 156.5 km (97.2 mi)

Stage 3 Result
Rank	Rider	Team	Time
1	Thibau Nys (BEL)	Lidl–Trek	4h 03' 21"
2	Diego Ulissi (ITA)	UAE Team Emirates	+ 0"
3	Wilco Kelderman (NED)	Visma–Lease a Bike	+ 0"
4	Archie Ryan (IRL)	EF Education–EasyPost	+ 0"
5	Magnus Sheffield (USA)	Ineos Grenadiers	+ 0"
6	Edoardo Zambanini (ITA)	Team Bahrain Victorious	+ 0"
7	Romain Grégoire (FRA)	Groupama–FDJ	+ 0"
8	Matej Mohorič (SLO)	Team Bahrain Victorious	+ 0"
9	Jonas Vingegaard (DEN)	Visma–Lease a Bike	+ 0"
10	Aurélien Paret-Peintre (FRA)	Decathlon–AG2R La Mondiale	+ 0"

General classification after Stage 3
Rank	Rider	Team	Time
1	Jonas Vingegaard (DEN)	Visma–Lease a Bike	8h 04' 48"
2	Diego Ulissi (ITA)	UAE Team Emirates	+ 19"
3	Wilco Kelderman (NED)	Visma–Lease a Bike	+ 20"
4	Romain Grégoire (FRA)	Groupama–FDJ	+ 33"
5	Magnus Sheffield (USA)	Ineos Grenadiers	+ 37"
6	Edoardo Zambanini (ITA)	Team Bahrain Victorious	+ 45"
7	Yannis Voisard (SUI)	Tudor Pro Cycling Team	+ 49"
8	Matej Mohorič (SLO)	Team Bahrain Victorious	+ 49"
9	Mikkel Frølich Honoré (DEN)	EF Education–EasyPost	+ 49"
10	Felix Großschartner (AUT)	UAE Team Emirates	+ 50"

=== Stage 4 ===
15 August 2024 – Kudowa-Zdrój to Prudnik 195.3 km (121.4 mi)

Stage 4 Result
Rank	Rider	Team	Time
1	Olav Kooij (NED)	Visma–Lease a Bike	4h 46' 20"
2	Sam Bennett (IRL)	Decathlon–AG2R La Mondiale	+ 0"
3	Mads Pedersen (DEN)	Lidl–Trek	+ 0"
4	Jordi Meeus (BEL)	Red Bull–Bora–Hansgrohe	+ 0"
5	Tim Merlier (BEL)	Soudal–Quick-Step	+ 0"
6	Stanisław Aniołkowski (POL)	Cofidis	+ 0"
7	Gerben Thijssen (BEL)	Intermarché–Wanty	+ 0"
8	Alberto Dainese (ITA)	Tudor Pro Cycling Team	+ 0"
9	Jensen Plowright (AUS)	Alpecin–Deceuninck	+ 0"
10	Phil Bauhaus (GER)	Team Bahrain Victorious	+ 0"

General classification after Stage 4
Rank	Rider	Team	Time
1	Jonas Vingegaard (DEN)	Visma–Lease a Bike	12h 51' 08"
2	Diego Ulissi (ITA)	UAE Team Emirates	+ 19"
3	Wilco Kelderman (NED)	Visma–Lease a Bike	+ 20"
4	Romain Grégoire (FRA)	Groupama–FDJ	+ 33"
5	Magnus Sheffield (USA)	Ineos Grenadiers	+ 37"
6	Matej Mohorič (SLO)	Team Bahrain Victorious	+ 44"
7	Edoardo Zambanini (ITA)	Team Bahrain Victorious	+ 44"
8	Mikkel Frølich Honoré (DEN)	EF Education–EasyPost	+ 49"
9	Yannis Voisard (SUI)	Tudor Pro Cycling Team	+ 49"
10	Felix Großschartner (AUT)	UAE Team Emirates	+ 50"

=== Stage 5 ===
16 August 2024 – Katowice to Katowice 187.6 km (116.6 mi)

Stage 5 Result
Rank	Rider	Team	Time
1	Tim Merlier (BEL)	Soudal–Quick-Step	4h 05' 00"
2	Jordi Meeus (BEL)	Red Bull–Bora–Hansgrohe	+ 0"
3	Olav Kooij (NED)	Visma–Lease a Bike	+ 0"
4	Jensen Plowright (AUS)	Alpecin–Deceuninck	+ 0"
5	Jake Stewart (GBR)	Israel–Premier Tech	+ 0"
6	Davide Cimolai (ITA)	Movistar Team	+ 0"
7	Danny van Poppel (NED)	Red Bull–Bora–Hansgrohe	+ 0"
8	Stanisław Aniołkowski (POL)	Cofidis	+ 0"
9	Andrea Pasqualon (ITA)	Team Bahrain Victorious	+ 0"
10	Casper van Uden (NED)	Team dsm–firmenich PostNL	+ 0"

General classification after Stage 5
Rank	Rider	Team	Time
1	Jonas Vingegaard (DEN)	Visma–Lease a Bike	16h 56' 08"
2	Diego Ulissi (ITA)	UAE Team Emirates	+ 19"
3	Wilco Kelderman (NED)	Visma–Lease a Bike	+ 20"
4	Romain Grégoire (FRA)	Groupama–FDJ	+ 33"
5	Magnus Sheffield (USA)	Ineos Grenadiers	+ 37"
6	Matej Mohorič (SLO)	Team Bahrain Victorious	+ 44"
7	Edoardo Zambanini (ITA)	Team Bahrain Victorious	+ 44"
8	Yannis Voisard (SUI)	Tudor Pro Cycling Team	+ 49"
9	Mikkel Frølich Honoré (DEN)	EF Education–EasyPost	+ 49"
10	Felix Großschartner (AUT)	UAE Team Emirates	+ 50"

=== Stage 6 ===
17 August 2024 – Wadowice to Bukowina Tatrzańska 183.2 km (113.8 mi)

Stage 6 Result
Rank	Rider	Team	Time
1	Thibau Nys (BEL)	Lidl–Trek	4h 26' 06"
2	Diego Ulissi (ITA)	UAE Team Emirates	+ 0"
3	Oscar Onley (GBR)	Team dsm–firmenich PostNL	+ 0"
4	Jonas Vingegaard (DEN)	Visma–Lease a Bike	+ 0"
5	Wilco Kelderman (NED)	Visma–Lease a Bike	+ 0"
6	Andrea Bagioli (ITA)	Lidl–Trek	+ 0"
7	Aurélien Paret-Peintre (FRA)	Decathlon–AG2R La Mondiale	+ 0"
8	Edoardo Zambanini (ITA)	Team Bahrain Victorious	+ 0"
9	Matej Mohorič (SLO)	Team Bahrain Victorious	+ 0"
10	Frederik Wandahl (DEN)	Red Bull–Bora–Hansgrohe	+ 0"

General classification after Stage 6
Rank	Rider	Team	Time
1	Jonas Vingegaard (DEN)	Visma–Lease a Bike	21h 22' 14"
2	Diego Ulissi (ITA)	UAE Team Emirates	+ 13"
3	Wilco Kelderman (NED)	Visma–Lease a Bike	+ 20"
4	Romain Grégoire (FRA)	Groupama–FDJ	+ 33"
5	Magnus Sheffield (USA)	Ineos Grenadiers	+ 37"
6	Matej Mohorič (SLO)	Team Bahrain Victorious	+ 44"
7	Edoardo Zambanini (ITA)	Team Bahrain Victorious	+ 44"
8	Yannis Voisard (SUI)	Tudor Pro Cycling Team	+ 49"
9	Mikkel Frølich Honoré (DEN)	EF Education–EasyPost	+ 49"
10	Oscar Onley (GBR)	Team dsm–firmenich PostNL	+ 53"

=== Stage 7 ===
18 August 2024 – Wieliczka to Kraków 152 km (94 mi)

Stage 7 Result
Rank	Rider	Team	Time
1	Olav Kooij (NED)	Visma–Lease a Bike	3h 04' 08"
2	Tim Merlier (BEL)	Soudal–Quick-Step	+ 0"
3	Gerben Thijssen (BEL)	Intermarché–Wanty	+ 0"
4	Casper van Uden (NED)	Team dsm–firmenich PostNL	+ 0"
5	Jensen Plowright (AUS)	Alpecin–Deceuninck	+ 0"
6	Jordi Meeus (BEL)	Red Bull–Bora–Hansgrohe	+ 0"
7	Elmar Reinders (NED)	Team Jayco–AlUla	+ 0"
8	Oliver Naesen (BEL)	Decathlon–AG2R La Mondiale	+ 0"
9	Ben Swift (GBR)	Ineos Grenadiers	+ 0"
10	Edward Theuns (BEL)	Lidl–Trek	+ 0"

General classification after Stage 7
Rank	Rider	Team	Time
1	Jonas Vingegaard (DEN)	Visma–Lease a Bike	24h 26' 22"
2	Diego Ulissi (ITA)	UAE Team Emirates	+ 13"
3	Wilco Kelderman (NED)	Visma–Lease a Bike	+ 20"
4	Romain Grégoire (FRA)	Groupama–FDJ	+ 33"
5	Magnus Sheffield (USA)	Ineos Grenadiers	+ 37"
6	Matej Mohorič (SLO)	Team Bahrain Victorious	+ 44"
7	Edoardo Zambanini (ITA)	Team Bahrain Victorious	+ 44"
8	Yannis Voisard (SUI)	Tudor Pro Cycling Team	+ 49"
9	Mikkel Frølich Honoré (DEN)	EF Education–EasyPost	+ 49"
10	Oscar Onley (GBR)	Team dsm–firmenich PostNL	+ 53"

== Classification leadership table ==
Classification leadership by stage
Stage	Winner	General classification (Polish: Żółta koszulka)	Sprints classification (Polish: Klasyfikacja sprinterska)	Mountains classification (Polish: Klasyfikacja górska)	Active rider classification (Polish: Klasyfikacja najaktywniejszych)	Polish rider classification (Polish: Najlepszy Polak)	Team classification (Polish: Klasyfikacja drużynowa)
1	Thibau Nys	Thibau Nys	Thibau Nys	Michał Paluta	Szymon Sajnok	Rafał Majka	UAE Team Emirates
2	Tim Wellens	Jonas Vingegaard	Jonas Vingegaard	Michał Paluta	Szymon Sajnok	Rafał Majka	UAE Team Emirates
3	Thibau Nys	Jonas Vingegaard	Diego Ulissi	Michał Paluta	Szymon Sajnok	Rafał Majka	UAE Team Emirates
4	Olav Kooij	Jonas Vingegaard	Diego Ulissi	Michał Paluta	Szymon Sajnok	Rafał Majka	UAE Team Emirates
5	Tim Merlier	Jonas Vingegaard	Diego Ulissi	Michał Paluta	Norbert Banaszek	Rafał Majka	UAE Team Emirates
6	Thibau Nys	Jonas Vingegaard	Diego Ulissi	Michał Paluta	Norbert Banaszek	Rafał Majka	UAE Team Emirates
7	Olav Kooij	Jonas Vingegaard	Diego Ulissi	Michał Paluta	Norbert Banaszek	Rafał Majka	UAE Team Emirates
Final		Jonas Vingegaard	Diego Ulissi	Michał Paluta	Norbert Banaszek	Rafał Majka	UAE Team Emirates

== Classification standings ==
Legend
Denotes the winner of the general classification	Denotes the winner of the sprints classification
Denotes the winner of the mountains classification	Denotes the winner of the active rider classification

=== General classification ===
Final general classification (1–10)
Rank	Rider	Team	Time
1	Jonas Vingegaard (DEN)	Visma–Lease a Bike	24h 26' 22"
2	Diego Ulissi (ITA)	UAE Team Emirates	+ 13"
3	Wilco Kelderman (NED)	Visma–Lease a Bike	+ 20"
4	Romain Grégoire (FRA)	Groupama–FDJ	+ 33"
5	Magnus Sheffield (USA)	Ineos Grenadiers	+ 37"
6	Matej Mohorič (SLO)	Team Bahrain Victorious	+ 44"
7	Edoardo Zambanini (ITA)	Team Bahrain Victorious	+ 44"
8	Yannis Voisard (SUI)	Tudor Pro Cycling Team	+ 49"
9	Mikkel Frølich Honoré (DEN)	EF Education–EasyPost	+ 49"
10	Oscar Onley (GBR)	Team dsm–firmenich PostNL	+ 53"

=== Sprints classification ===
Final sprints classification (1–10)
Rank	Rider	Team	Time
1	Diego Ulissi (ITA)	UAE Team Emirates	68
2	Jonas Vingegaard (DEN)	Visma–Lease a Bike	65
3	Wilco Kelderman (NED)	Visma–Lease a Bike	64
4	Thibau Nys (BEL)	Lidl–Trek	60
5	Olav Kooij (NED)	Visma–Lease a Bike	58
6	Tim Merlier (BEL)	Soudal–Quick-Step	55
7	Jordi Meeus (BEL)	Red Bull–Bora–Hansgrohe	51
8	Romain Grégoire (FRA)	Groupama–FDJ	49
9	Magnus Sheffield (USA)	Ineos Grenadiers	48
10	Matej Mohorič (SLO)	Team Bahrain Victorious	46

=== Mountains classification ===
Final mountains classification (1–10)
Rank	Rider	Team	Time
1	Michał Paluta (POL)	Poland	33
2	Silvan Dillier (SUI)	Alpecin–Deceuninck	17
3	Jan Maas (NED)	Team Jayco–AlUla	17
4	Davide Formolo (ITA)	Movistar Team	15
5	Archie Ryan (IRL)	EF Education–EasyPost	13
6	Samuele Battistella (ITA)	Astana Qazaqstan Team	12
7	Wilco Kelderman (NED)	Visma–Lease a Bike	7
8	Jonas Vingegaard (DEN)	Visma–Lease a Bike	5
9	Johan Jacobs (SUI)	Movistar Team	3
10	Oscar Onley (GBR)	Team dsm–firmenich PostNL	3

=== Active rider classification ===
Final active rider classification (1–10)
Rank	Rider	Team	Time
1	Norbert Banaszek (POL)	Poland	11
2	Kacper Gieryk (POL)	Poland	6
3	Matej Mohorič (SLO)	Team Bahrain Victorious	5
4	Jan Maas (NED)	Team Jayco–AlUla	4
5	Davide Formolo (ITA)	Movistar Team	3
6	Marcin Budziński (POL)	Poland	3
7	Mick van Dijke (NED)	Visma–Lease a Bike	3
8	Johan Jacobs (SUI)	Movistar Team	3
9	Michał Paluta (POL)	Poland	3
10	Archie Ryan (IRL)	EF Education–EasyPost	2

=== Team classification ===
Final team classification (1–10)
Rank	Team	Time
1	(United Arab Emirates) UAE Team Emirates	73h 20' 28"
2	Team Bahrain Victorious	+ 5' 05"
3	(United States) EF Education–EasyPost	+ 7' 40"
4	(Netherlands) Visma–Lease a Bike	+ 14' 34"
5	(Switzerland) Q36.5 Pro Cycling Team	+ 15' 28"
6	(Spain) Movistar Team	+ 17' 22"
7	Israel–Premier Tech	+ 17' 34"
8	(Switzerland) Tudor Pro Cycling Team	+ 18' 40"
9	(France) Cofidis	+ 20' 08"
10	(France) Decathlon–AG2R La Mondiale	+ 20' 35"

== See also ==
- Tour of Małopolska
