= Olav Kooij =

Dutch racing cyclist (born 2001)

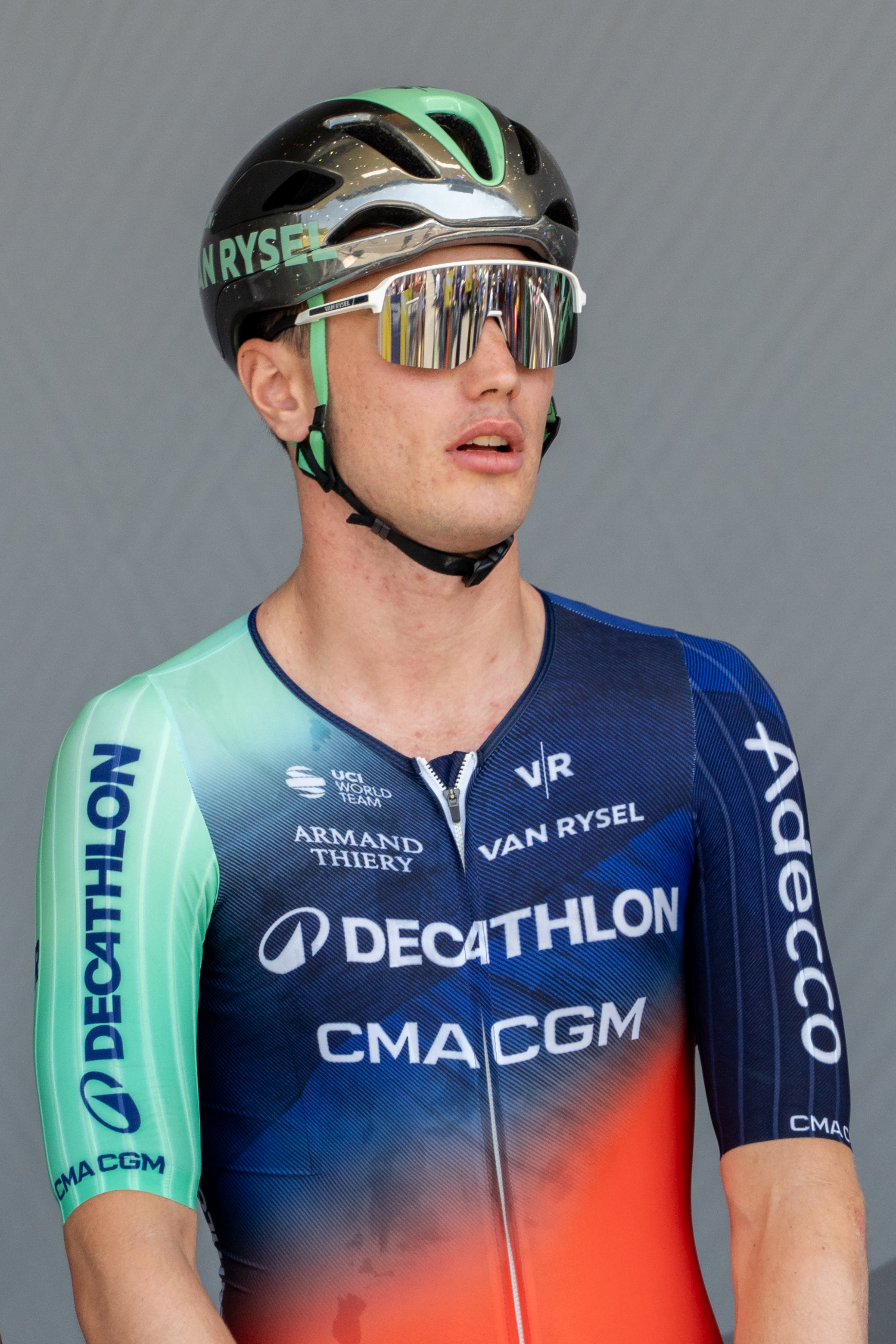
- Kooij at the 2026 Tour de France

Personal information
- Full name: Olav Kooij
- Born: 17 October 2001 (age 25) Numansdorp, Netherlands
- Height: 1.84 m (6 ft 1/2 in)
- Weight: 72 kg (159 lb)

Cycling career
- Sport: Cycling
- Current team: Decathlon CMA CGM
- Discipline: Road
- Role: Rider
- Rider type: Sprinter

Amateur teams
- 2018: Forte U19 Cycling Team
- 2019: Willebrord Wil Vooruit

Professional teams
- 2020–2021: Jumbo–Visma Development Team
- 2020: Team Jumbo–Visma (development) (Note: Kooij competed at the 2020 Czech Cycling Tour with Team Jumbo–Visma, following the introduction of a UCI rule allowing riders registered with a development team to participate in UCI ProSeries or Class 1 events.)
- 2021–2025: Team Jumbo–Visma
- 2026–: Decathlon CMA CGM

Major wins
- Grand Tours Tour de France 1 individual stage (2026) Giro d'Italia 3 individual stages (2024, 2025) Stage races ZLM Tour (2022, 2023) One-day races and Classics Hamburg Cyclassics (2024) Clásica de Almería (2024) Münsterland Giro (2022, 2026)
Medal record
Men's road bicycle racing
Representing the Netherlands
World Championships
Bronze medal – third place	2021 Flanders	Under-23 road race
European Championships
Silver medal – second place	2024 Limburg	Road race
Bronze medal – third place	2023 Drenthe	Road race

Olav Kooij (born 17 October 2001) is a Dutch professional racing cyclist, who currently rides for UCI WorldTeam Decathlon CMA CGM.

== Career ==
=== Developmental ===
Kooij rode for the Forte U19 Cycling Team and Willebrord Wil Vooruit as a junior, before signing for the Jumbo–Visma Development Team for their inaugural season in 2020. He finished second to David Dekker, in his first UCI race with the team at the Ster van Zwolle, before he took three successive victories – either side of the enforced break from racing due to the COVID-19 pandemic – at the Trofej Umag, the Poreč Trophy and the GP Kranj. He competed at the Czech Cycling Tour for Team Jumbo–Visma, with Jumbo–Visma Development Team colleagues Lars Boven, Owen Geleijn and Michel Hessmann.

=== UCI World Team ===
In August 2020, it was announced that Kooij was to join UCI WorldTeam Team Jumbo–Visma midway through the 2021 season, after spending the first part of the season with the Jumbo–Visma Development Team; he signed a contract until the end of the 2023 season. The following month, he won the opening stage of the Settimana Internazionale di Coppi e Bartali in a sprint finish, ahead of Ethan Hayter and Phil Bauhaus.

In February 2021, Team Jumbo–Visma announced that Kooij would make an immediate move to the World Tour Team, thus becoming the first teenager cyclist to have a full season contract with the team since its creation.

He signed for Decathlon CMA CGM ahead of the 2026 season.

== Major results ==
2018
1st Overall La Coupe du Président de la Ville de Grudziądz

1st Points classification
1st Sprints classification
1st Young rider classification
1st Stages 1b & 4

2019
Tour de DMZ

1st Stages 1, 3 & 5

1st Stage 3 Driedaagse van Axel
4th Road race, National Junior Road Championships
4th Johan Museeuw Classic
5th La Route des Géants Saint-Omer–Ypres
6th Omloop der Vlaamse Gewesten
7th Road race, UEC European Junior Road Championships
8th EPZ Omloop van Borsele
2020 (1 pro win)
1st Overall Orlen Nations Grand Prix

1st Stages 1 (TTT) & 2

1st Trofej Umag
1st Poreč Trophy
1st GP Kranj
1st Stage 1a Settimana Internazionale di Coppi e Bartali
2nd Ster van Zwolle
5th Road race, UEC European Under-23 Road Championships
2021 (2)
CRO Race

1st Points classification
1st Stages 2 & 4

3rd Road race, UCI Road World Under-23 Championships
3rd Gran Piemonte
2022 (12)
1st Overall ZLM Tour

1st Points classification
1st Young rider classification
1st Stages 1, 2 & 5

1st Overall Circuit de la Sarthe

1st Young rider classification
1st Stages 2 & 4

1st Münsterland Giro
Danmark Rundt

1st Stages 1 & 3

1st Stage 1 Tour de Pologne
1st Stage 1 Tour de Hongrie
5th Road race, UCI Road World Under-23 Championships
5th Classic Brugge–De Panne
2023 (13)
1st Overall ZLM Tour

1st Points classification
1st Young rider classification
1st Stage 4

1st Heistse Pijl
Tour of Britain

1st Points classification
1st Stages 1, 2, 3 & 4

Paris–Nice

1st Stages 3 (TTT) & 5

Tour of Guangxi

1st Stages 3 & 6

1st Stage 4 Tour de Pologne
2nd Road race, National Road Championships
2nd Classic Brugge–De Panne
2nd Gooikse Pijl
2nd Visit Friesland Elfsteden Race
3rd Road race, UEC European Road Championships
4th Overall Four Days of Dunkirk

1st Points classification
1st Stages 1 & 4

8th Gent–Wevelgem
2024 (8)
1st Hamburg Cyclassics
1st Clásica de Almería
Paris–Nice

1st Stages 1 & 5

Tour de Pologne

1st Stages 4 & 7

1st Stage 9 Giro d'Italia
1st Stage 5 UAE Tour
2nd Road race, UEC European Road Championships
2nd Road race, National Road Championships
3rd Gooikse Pijl
6th Gent–Wevelgem
2025 (11)
1st Grand Prix d'Isbergues
Giro d'Italia

1st Stages 12 & 21

Tour of Britain

1st Points classification
1st Stages 1, 2 & 6

Tour of Oman

1st Stages 1 & 4

1st Stage 4 Tirreno–Adriatico
1st Stage 1 Tour de Pologne
2nd Road race, National Road Championships
2nd Kuurne–Brussels–Kuurne
3rd Bretagne Classic
5th Overall Renewi Tour

1st Stage 2

8th Milan–San Remo
2026 (7)
1st Münsterland Giro
1st Grand Prix d'Isbergues
Boucles de la Mayenne

1st Points classification
1st Stages 1 & 3

1st Stage 5 Tour de France
1st Stage 3 Tour of Britain
1st Stage 4 Tour of Belgium
3rd Overall Renewi Tour

=== Grand Tour general classification results timeline ===
Grand Tour	2024	2025	2026
Giro d'Italia	DNF	149	—
Tour de France	—	—	149
Vuelta a España	—	—	—

=== Classics results timeline ===
Monument	2021	2022	2023	2024	2025	2026
Milan–San Remo	—	—	—	14	8	—
Tour of Flanders	Has not contested during career					
Paris–Roubaix	Has not contested during career					
Liège–Bastogne–Liège	Has not contested during career					
Giro di Lombardia	Has not contested during career					
Classic	2021	2022	2023	2024	2025	2026
Omloop Het Nieuwsblad	89	—	—	—	—	—
Kuurne–Brussels–Kuurne	—	—	—	—	2	—
Brugge–De Panne	74	5	2	—	140	—
Gent–Wevelgem	—	—	8	6	DNF	—
Hamburg Cyclassics	—	—	16	1	—	69
Bretagne Classic	—	—	—	—	3	—
Gran Piemonte	3	84	—	—	—	—
Paris–Tours	—	12	—	—	70	

=== Major championships results timeline ===
Event	2021	2022	2023	2024	2025	2026
World Championships	—	—	45	—	—	—
European Championships	—	—	3	2	—	—
National Championships	7	40	2	2	2	—

Legend
—	Did not compete
DNF	Did not finish
