= 2023 Tirreno–Adriatico =

Italian cycling race

2023 UCI World Tour, race 7 of 35

Race details
- Dates: 6–12 March 2023
- Stages: 7
- Distance: 1,170.5 km (727.3 mi)
- Winning time: 28h 38' 57"

Results
Jersey awarded to the overall winner	Winner	Primož Roglič (SLO)	(Team Jumbo–Visma)
	Second	João Almeida (POR)	(UAE Team Emirates)
	Third	Tao Geoghegan Hart (GBR)	(Ineos Grenadiers)
Jersey awarded to the points classification winner	Points	Primož Roglič (SLO)	(Team Jumbo–Visma)
Jersey awarded to the mountains classification winner	Mountains	Primož Roglič (SLO)	(Team Jumbo–Visma)
Jersey awarded to the youth classification winner	Youth	João Almeida (POR)	(UAE Team Emirates)
	Team	(United Arab Emirates) UAE Team Emirates	

The 2023 Tirreno–Adriatico was a road cycling stage race that took place between 6 and 12 March 2023 in Italy. It was the 58th edition of the Tirreno–Adriatico and the seventh race of the 2023 UCI World Tour.

== Teams ==
All 18 UCI WorldTeams and seven UCI ProTeams made up the 25 teams that participated in the race.

UCI WorldTeams

- AG2R Citroën Team
- Alpecin–Deceuninck
- Arkéa–Samsic
- Astana Qazaqstan Team
- Bora–Hansgrohe
- Cofidis
- EF Education–EasyPost
- Groupama–FDJ
- Ineos Grenadiers
- Intermarché–Circus–Wanty
- Movistar Team
- Soudal–Quick-Step
- Team Bahrain Victorious
- Team DSM
- Team Jayco–AlUla
- Team Jumbo–Visma
- Trek–Segafredo
- UAE Team Emirates

UCI ProTeams

- Eolo–Kometa
- Green Project–Bardiani–CSF–Faizanè
- Israel–Premier Tech
- Q36.5 Pro Cycling Team
- Team Corratec
- Team TotalEnergies
- Tudor Pro Cycling Team

== Route ==
Stage characteristics and winners
Stage	Date	Course	Distance	Type	Stage winner
1	6 March	Lido di Camaiore	11.5 km (7.1 mi)	Individual time trial	Filippo Ganna (ITA)
2	7 March	Camaiore to Follonica	210 km (130 mi)	Flat stage	Fabio Jakobsen (NED)
3	8 March	Follonica to Foligno	216 km (134 mi)	Flat stage	Jasper Philipsen (BEL)
4	9 March	Greccio to Tortoreto	218 km (135 mi)	Hilly stage	Primož Roglič (SLO)
5	10 March	Morro d'Oro to Sarnano-Sassotetto	168 km (104 mi)	Mountain stage	Primož Roglič (SLO)
6	11 March	Osimo Stazione to Osimo	193 km (120 mi)	Intermediate stage	Primož Roglič (SLO)
7	12 March	San Benedetto del Tronto to San Benedetto del Tronto	154 km (96 mi)	Flat stage	Jasper Philipsen (BEL)
Total			1,170.5 km (727.3 mi)		

== Stages ==
=== Stage 1 ===
6 March 2023 — Lido di Camaiore, 11.5 km (7.1 mi) (ITT)

Stage 1 Result (1–10)
Rank	Rider	Team	Time
1	Filippo Ganna (ITA)	Ineos Grenadiers	12' 28"
2	Lennard Kämna (GER)	Bora–Hansgrohe	+ 28"
3	Magnus Sheffield (USA)	Ineos Grenadiers	+ 31"
4	Michael Hepburn (AUS)	Team Jayco–AlUla	+ 33"
5	Brandon McNulty (USA)	UAE Team Emirates	+ 34"
6	Thymen Arensman (NED)	Ineos Grenadiers	+ 39"
7	João Almeida (POR)	UAE Team Emirates	+ 41"
8	Andreas Leknessund (NOR)	Team DSM	+ 41"
9	Casper Pedersen (DEN)	Soudal–Quick-Step	+ 47"
10	Wilco Kelderman (NED)	Team Jumbo–Visma	+ 48"

General classification after Stage 1 (1–10)
Rank	Rider	Team	Time
1	Filippo Ganna (ITA)	Ineos Grenadiers	12' 28"
2	Lennard Kämna (GER)	Bora–Hansgrohe	+ 28"
3	Magnus Sheffield (USA)	Ineos Grenadiers	+ 31"
4	Michael Hepburn (AUS)	Team Jayco–AlUla	+ 33"
5	Brandon McNulty (USA)	UAE Team Emirates	+ 34"
6	Thymen Arensman (NED)	Ineos Grenadiers	+ 39"
7	João Almeida (POR)	UAE Team Emirates	+ 41"
8	Andreas Leknessund (NOR)	Team DSM	+ 41"
9	Casper Pedersen (DEN)	Soudal–Quick-Step	+ 47"
10	Wilco Kelderman (NED)	Team Jumbo–Visma	+ 48"

=== Stage 2 ===
7 March 2023 – Camaiore to Follonica, 210 km (130 mi)

Stage 2 Result (1–10)
Rank	Rider	Team	Time
1	Fabio Jakobsen (NED)	Soudal–Quick-Step	5h 06' 33"
2	Jasper Philipsen (BEL)	Alpecin–Deceuninck	+ 0"
3	Fernando Gaviria (COL)	Movistar Team	+ 0"
4	Biniam Girmay (ERI)	Intermarché–Circus–Wanty	+ 0"
5	Juan Sebastián Molano (COL)	UAE Team Emirates	+ 0"
6	Phil Bauhaus (GER)	Team Bahrain Victorious	+ 0"
7	Dylan Groenewegen (NED)	Team Jayco–AlUla	+ 0"
8	Simone Consonni (ITA)	Cofidis	+ 0"
9	Jordi Meeus (BEL)	Bora–Hansgrohe	+ 0"
10	Nacer Bouhanni (FRA)	Arkéa–Samsic	+ 0"

General classification after Stage 2 (1–10)
Rank	Rider	Team	Time
1	Filippo Ganna (ITA)	Ineos Grenadiers	5h 19' 01"
2	Lennard Kämna (GER)	Bora–Hansgrohe	+ 28"
3	Magnus Sheffield (USA)	Ineos Grenadiers	+ 31"
4	Brandon McNulty (USA)	UAE Team Emirates	+ 34"
5	Thymen Arensman (NED)	Ineos Grenadiers	+ 39"
6	João Almeida (POR)	UAE Team Emirates	+ 41"
7	Andreas Leknessund (NOR)	Team DSM	+ 41"
8	Casper Pedersen (DEN)	Soudal–Quick-Step	+ 47"
9	Wilco Kelderman (NED)	Team Jumbo–Visma	+ 48"
10	Alexey Lutsenko (KAZ)	Astana Qazaqstan Team	+ 48"

=== Stage 3 ===
8 March 2023 – Follonica to Foligno, 216 km (134 mi)

Stage 3 Result (1–10)
Rank	Rider	Team	Time
1	Jasper Philipsen (BEL)	Alpecin–Deceuninck	5h 19' 08"
2	Phil Bauhaus (GER)	Team Bahrain Victorious	+ 0"
3	Biniam Girmay (ERI)	Intermarché–Circus–Wanty	+ 0"
4	Matteo Moschetti (ITA)	Q36.5 Pro Cycling Team	+ 0"
5	Simone Consonni (ITA)	Cofidis	+ 0"
6	Wout van Aert (BEL)	Team Jumbo–Visma	+ 0"
7	Edward Theuns (BEL)	Trek–Segafredo	+ 0"
8	Dylan Groenewegen (NED)	Team Jayco–AlUla	+ 0"
9	Fabio Jakobsen (NED)	Soudal–Quick-Step	+ 0"
10	Jordi Meeus (BEL)	Bora–Hansgrohe	+ 0"

General classification after Stage 3 (1–10)
Rank	Rider	Team	Time
1	Filippo Ganna (ITA)	Ineos Grenadiers	10h 38' 09"
2	Lennard Kämna (GER)	Bora–Hansgrohe	+ 28"
3	Magnus Sheffield (USA)	Ineos Grenadiers	+ 30"
4	Brandon McNulty (USA)	UAE Team Emirates	+ 34"
5	Thymen Arensman (NED)	Ineos Grenadiers	+ 39"
6	João Almeida (POR)	UAE Team Emirates	+ 41"
7	Andreas Leknessund (NOR)	Team DSM	+ 41"
8	Casper Pedersen (DEN)	Soudal–Quick-Step	+ 47"
9	Wilco Kelderman (NED)	Team Jumbo–Visma	+ 48"
10	Alexey Lutsenko (KAZ)	Astana Qazaqstan Team	+ 48"

=== Stage 4 ===
9 March 2023 – Greccio to Tortoreto, 218 km (135 mi)

Stage 4 Result (1–10)
Rank	Rider	Team	Time
1	Primož Roglič (SLO)	Team Jumbo–Visma	5h 00' 04"
2	Julian Alaphilippe (FRA)	Soudal–Quick-Step	+ 0"
3	Adam Yates (GBR)	UAE Team Emirates	+ 0"
4	Wilco Kelderman (NED)	Team Jumbo–Visma	+ 0"
5	Tao Geoghegan Hart (GBR)	Ineos Grenadiers	+ 0"
6	Enric Mas (ESP)	Movistar Team	+ 0"
7	Victor Lafay (FRA)	Cofidis	+ 0"
8	João Almeida (POR)	UAE Team Emirates	+ 0"
9	Aleksandr Vlasov	Bora–Hansgrohe	+ 0"
10	Hugh Carthy (GBR)	EF Education–EasyPost	+ 0"

General classification after Stage 4 (1–10)
Rank	Rider	Team	Time
1	Lennard Kämna (GER)	Bora–Hansgrohe	15h 38' 46"
2	Primož Roglič (SLO)	Team Jumbo–Visma	+ 6"
3	João Almeida (POR)	UAE Team Emirates	+ 8"
4	Brandon McNulty (USA)	UAE Team Emirates	+ 13"
5	Wilco Kelderman (NED)	Team Jumbo–Visma	+ 15"
6	Aleksandr Vlasov	Bora–Hansgrohe	+ 17"
7	Jai Hindley (AUS)	Bora–Hansgrohe	+ 18"
8	Tao Geoghegan Hart (GBR)	Ineos Grenadiers	+ 19"
9	Giulio Ciccone (ITA)	Trek–Segafredo	+ 26"
10	Enric Mas (ESP)	Movistar Team	+ 27"

=== Stage 5 ===
10 March 2023 – Morro d'Oro to Sarnano-Sassotetto, 168 km (104 mi)

Stage 5 Result (1–10)
Rank	Rider	Team	Time
1	Primož Roglič (SLO)	Team Jumbo–Visma	4h 38' 32"
2	Giulio Ciccone (ITA)	Trek–Segafredo	+ 0"
3	Tao Geoghegan Hart (GBR)	Ineos Grenadiers	+ 0"
4	Jai Hindley (AUS)	Bora–Hansgrohe	+ 0"
5	Lennard Kämna (GER)	Bora–Hansgrohe	+ 0"
6	Aleksandr Vlasov	Bora–Hansgrohe	+ 0"
7	Mikel Landa (ESP)	Team Bahrain Victorious	+ 0"
8	João Almeida (POR)	UAE Team Emirates	+ 0"
9	Damiano Caruso (ITA)	Team Bahrain Victorious	+ 0"
10	Brandon McNulty (USA)	UAE Team Emirates	+ 0"

General classification after Stage 5 (1–10)
Rank	Rider	Team	Time
1	Primož Roglič (SLO)	Team Jumbo–Visma	20h 17' 14"
2	Lennard Kämna (GER)	Bora–Hansgrohe	+ 4"
3	João Almeida (POR)	UAE Team Emirates	+ 12"
4	Brandon McNulty (USA)	UAE Team Emirates	+ 17"
5	Wilco Kelderman (NED)	Team Jumbo–Visma	+ 19"
6	Tao Geoghegan Hart (GBR)	Ineos Grenadiers	+ 19"
7	Aleksandr Vlasov	Bora–Hansgrohe	+ 21"
8	Jai Hindley (AUS)	Bora–Hansgrohe	+ 22"
9	Giulio Ciccone (ITA)	Trek–Segafredo	+ 24"
10	Enric Mas (ESP)	Movistar Team	+ 31"

=== Stage 6 ===
11 March 2023 – Osimo Stazione to Osimo, 193 km (120 mi)

Stage 6 Result (1–10)
Rank	Rider	Team	Time
1	Primož Roglič (SLO)	Team Jumbo–Visma	4h 49' 17"
2	Tao Geoghegan Hart (GBR)	Ineos Grenadiers	+ 0"
3	João Almeida (POR)	UAE Team Emirates	+ 0"
4	Enric Mas (ESP)	Movistar Team	+ 0"
5	Mikel Landa (ESP)	Team Bahrain Victorious	+ 0"
6	Giulio Ciccone (ITA)	Trek–Segafredo	+ 3"
7	Hugh Carthy (GBR)	EF Education–EasyPost	+ 9"
8	Michael Woods (CAN)	Israel–Premier Tech	+ 9"
9	Tom Pidcock (GBR)	Ineos Grenadiers	+ 20"
10	Wout van Aert (BEL)	Team Jumbo–Visma	+ 20"

General classification after Stage 6 (1–10)
Rank	Rider	Team	Time
1	Primož Roglič (SLO)	Team Jumbo–Visma	25h 06' 21"
2	João Almeida (POR)	UAE Team Emirates	+ 18"
3	Tao Geoghegan Hart (GBR)	Ineos Grenadiers	+ 23"
4	Lennard Kämna (GER)	Bora–Hansgrohe	+ 34"
5	Giulio Ciccone (ITA)	Trek–Segafredo	+ 37"
6	Enric Mas (ESP)	Movistar Team	+ 41"
7	Mikel Landa (ESP)	Team Bahrain Victorious	+ 56"
8	Hugh Carthy (GBR)	EF Education–EasyPost	+ 57"
9	Aleksandr Vlasov	Bora–Hansgrohe	+ 1' 10"
10	Thibaut Pinot (FRA)	Groupama–FDJ	+ 1' 11"

=== Stage 7 ===
12 March 2023 – San Benedetto del Tronto to San Benedetto del Tronto, 154 km (96 mi)

Stage 7 Result (1–10)
Rank	Rider	Team	Time
1	Jasper Philipsen (BEL)	Alpecin–Deceuninck	3h 32' 36"
2	Dylan Groenewegen (NED)	Team Jayco–AlUla	+ 0"
3	Alberto Dainese (ITA)	Team DSM	+ 0"
4	Phil Bauhaus (GER)	Team Bahrain Victorious	+ 0"
5	Simone Consonni (ITA)	Cofidis	+ 0"
6	Giacomo Nizzolo (ITA)	Israel–Premier Tech	+ 3"
7	Jordi Meeus (BEL)	Bora–Hansgrohe	+ 9"
8	Clément Russo (FRA)	Arkéa–Samsic	+ 9"
9	Luca Colnaghi (ITA)	Green Project–Bardiani–CSF–Faizanè	+ 20"
10	Fernando Gaviria (COL)	Movistar Team	+ 20"

General classification after Stage 7 (1–10)
Rank	Rider	Team	Time
1	Primož Roglič (SLO)	Team Jumbo–Visma	28h 38' 57"
2	João Almeida (POR)	UAE Team Emirates	+ 18"
3	Tao Geoghegan Hart (GBR)	Ineos Grenadiers	+ 23"
4	Lennard Kämna (GER)	Bora–Hansgrohe	+ 34"
5	Giulio Ciccone (ITA)	Trek–Segafredo	+ 37"
6	Enric Mas (ESP)	Movistar Team	+ 41"
7	Mikel Landa (ESP)	Team Bahrain Victorious	+ 56"
8	Hugh Carthy (GBR)	EF Education–EasyPost	+ 57"
9	Aleksandr Vlasov	Bora–Hansgrohe	+ 1' 10"
10	Thibaut Pinot (FRA)	Groupama–FDJ	+ 1' 11"

== Classification leadership table ==
Classification leadership by stage
Stage	Winner	General classification	Points classification	Mountains classification	Young rider classification	Team classification
1	Filippo Ganna	Filippo Ganna	Filippo Ganna	not awarded	Magnus Sheffield	Ineos Grenadiers
2	Fabio Jakobsen	Filippo Ganna	Filippo Ganna	Stefano Gandin	Magnus Sheffield	Ineos Grenadiers
3	Jasper Philipsen	Filippo Ganna	Jasper Philipsen	Davide Bais	Magnus Sheffield	Ineos Grenadiers
4	Primož Roglič	Lennard Kämna	Jasper Philipsen	Davide Bais	João Almeida	Bora–Hansgrohe
5	Primož Roglič	Primož Roglič	Primož Roglič	Primož Roglič	João Almeida	Bora–Hansgrohe
6	Primož Roglič	Primož Roglič	Primož Roglič	Primož Roglič	João Almeida	UAE Team Emirates
7	Jasper Philipsen	Primož Roglič	Primož Roglič	Primož Roglič	João Almeida	UAE Team Emirates
Final		Primož Roglič	Primož Roglič	Primož Roglič	João Almeida	UAE Team Emirates

== Classification standings ==
Legend
Denotes the winner of the general classification	Denotes the winner of the mountains classification
Denotes the winner of the points classification	Denotes the winner of the young rider classification

=== General classification ===
Final general classification (1–10)
Rank	Rider	Team	Time
1	Primož Roglič (SLO)	Team Jumbo–Visma	28h 38' 57"
2	João Almeida (POR)	UAE Team Emirates	+ 18"
3	Tao Geoghegan Hart (GBR)	Ineos Grenadiers	+ 23"
4	Lennard Kämna (GER)	Bora–Hansgrohe	+ 34"
5	Giulio Ciccone (ITA)	Trek–Segafredo	+ 37"
6	Enric Mas (ESP)	Movistar Team	+ 41"
7	Mikel Landa (ESP)	Team Bahrain Victorious	+ 56"
8	Hugh Carthy (GBR)	EF Education–EasyPost	+ 57"
9	Aleksandr Vlasov	Bora–Hansgrohe	+ 1' 10"
10	Thibaut Pinot (FRA)	Groupama–FDJ	+ 1' 11"

=== Points classification ===
Final points classification (1–10)
Rank	Rider	Team	Time
1	Primož Roglič (SLO)	Team Jumbo–Visma	36
2	Jasper Philipsen (BEL)	Alpecin–Deceuninck	34
3	Tao Geoghegan Hart (GBR)	Ineos Grenadiers	24
4	Phil Bauhaus (GER)	Team Bahrain Victorious	22
5	João Almeida (POR)	UAE Team Emirates	18
6	Dylan Groenewegen (NED)	Team Jayco–AlUla	17
7	Lennard Kämna (GER)	Bora–Hansgrohe	16
8	Giulio Ciccone (ITA)	Trek–Segafredo	15
9	Biniam Girmay (ERI)	Intermarché–Circus–Wanty	15
10	Simone Consonni (ITA)	Cofidis	15

=== Mountains classification ===
Final mountains classification (1–10)
Rank	Rider	Team	Time
1	Primož Roglič (SLO)	Team Jumbo–Visma	25
2	Davide Bais (ITA)	Eolo–Kometa	20
3	Giulio Ciccone (ITA)	Trek–Segafredo	18
4	Julian Alaphilippe (FRA)	Soudal–Quick-Step	11
5	Tao Geoghegan Hart (GBR)	Ineos Grenadiers	11
6	Quinn Simmons (USA)	Trek–Segafredo	9
7	Stefano Gandin (ITA)	Team Corratec	9
8	Jai Hindley (AUS)	Bora–Hansgrohe	7
9	Nikias Arndt (GER)	Team Bahrain Victorious	6
10	Mattia Bais (ITA)	Eolo–Kometa	6

=== Young rider classification ===
Final young rider classification (1–10)
Rank	Rider	Team	Time
1	João Almeida (POR)	UAE Team Emirates	28h 39' 15"
2	Brandon McNulty (USA)	UAE Team Emirates	+ 1' 01"
3	Felix Gall (AUT)	AG2R Citroën Team	+ 1' 56"
4	Andreas Leknessund (NOR)	Team DSM	+ 2' 08"
5	Thymen Arensman (NED)	Ineos Grenadiers	+ 4' 09"
6	Magnus Sheffield (USA)	Ineos Grenadiers	+ 7' 02"
7	Santiago Buitrago (COL)	Team Bahrain Victorious	+ 17' 05"
8	Attila Valter (HUN)	Team Jumbo–Visma	+ 17' 08"
9	Andrea Bagioli (ITA)	Soudal–Quick-Step	+ 21' 48"
10	Mark Donovan (GBR)	Q36.5 Pro Cycling Team	+ 23' 03"

=== Team classification ===
Final team classification (1–10)
Rank	Team	Time
1	(United Arab Emirates) UAE Team Emirates	85h 59' 51"
2	(Germany) Bora–Hansgrohe	+ 29"
3	(United Kingdom) Ineos Grenadiers	+ 5' 03"
4	(Spain) Movistar Team	+ 9' 26"
5	(Netherlands) Team DSM	+ 11' 11"
6	(Netherlands) Team Jumbo–Visma	+ 11' 30"
7	(France) Arkéa–Samsic	+ 14' 46"
8	Team Bahrain Victorious	+ 15' 04"
9	(France) Groupama–FDJ	+ 21' 14"
10	(France) AG2R Citroën Team	+ 27' 21"
