= 2021 Scheldeprijs =

2021 UCI Europe Tour 2021 UCI ProSeries
- Event poster with previous winner Caleb Ewan

Race details
- Dates: 7 April 2021
- Stages: 1
- Distance: 194.2 km (120.7 mi)
- Winning time: 4h 03' 28"

Results
	Winner	Jasper Philipsen (BEL)	(Alpecin–Fenix)
	Second	Sam Bennett (IRL)	(Deceuninck–Quick-Step)
	Third	Mark Cavendish (GBR)	(Deceuninck–Quick-Step)

The 2021 Scheldeprijs was the 109th edition of the Scheldeprijs road cycling one day race, which was held on 7 April 2021. It was a 1.Pro event on the 2021 UCI Europe Tour and the 2021 UCI ProSeries. The race, which was 194.2 kilometres (120.7 mi) long, started in Terneuzen in the Netherlands and traveled through the windy fields of Zeeland before crossing the border into Belgium and finishing in Schoten on the outskirts of Antwerp.

The Scheldeprijs is known as a race that particularly suits the sprinters as it includes several cobbled roads but no significant climbs. Defending champion Caleb Ewan (Lotto–Soudal) chose not to participate as he chose to rest to be able to participate in all three Grand Tours in 2021. Arnaud Démare would have started, but his team Groupama–FDJ backed out on last instance due to a positive COVID-19 test within the team. As a result, the main pre-race favorites were Sam Bennett (Deceuninck–Quick-Step), Tim Merlier (Alpecin–Fenix), Pascal Ackermann (Bora–Hansgrohe), Giacomo Nizzolo (Team Qhubeka Assos), Cees Bol (Team DSM), Elia Viviani (Cofidis) and previous winner Alexander Kristoff (UAE Team Emirates). Three-time winner Mark Cavendish (Deceuninck–Quick-Step) was also taking part, although it was assumed his team would aim for Bennett to win the race.

Following a breakaway by a group of 31 riders, the sprint was won by Jasper Philipsen in a group sprint which included most of the pre-race favorites. This marked the first time in 15 years the race was won by a Belgian rider, when Tom Boonen won the 2006 edition.

== Teams ==
Eleven of the nineteen UCI WorldTeams, nine UCI ProTeams, and two UCI Continental teams made up the twenty-two teams that participated in the race. Groupama–FDJ, Trek–Segafredo, and Vini Zabù were originally expected to participate. However, Trek–Segafredo voluntarily withdrew 'as a precautionary measure' following positive COVID-19 test results from several staff members, which had forced them to miss two races in the two weeks prior to the race. Meanwhile, Groupama–FDJ were a late scratch, after they received a positive COVID-19 test within the team on the day of the race. Vini Zabù imposed a self-suspension on racing after one of their riders received a positive anti-doping test. All but two teams entered seven riders; Astana–Premier Tech and Team DSM each entered six. Three more non-starters reduced the starting field to 152 riders, of which only 77 finished.

UCI WorldTeams

- AG2R Citroën Team
- Astana–Premier Tech
- Bora–Hansgrohe
- Cofidis
- Deceuninck–Quick-Step
- ~~Groupama–FDJ~~
- Intermarché–Wanty–Gobert Matériaux
- Israel Start-Up Nation
- Lotto–Soudal
- Team DSM
- Team Qhubeka Assos
- ~~Trek–Segafredo~~
- UAE Team Emirates

UCI ProTeams

- Alpecin–Fenix
- Arkéa–Samsic
- B&B Hotels p/b KTM
- Bingoal Pauwels Sauces WB
- Delko
- Rally Cycling
- Sport Vlaanderen–Baloise
- Total Direct Énergie
- Uno-X Pro Cycling Team
- ~~Vini Zabù~~

UCI Continental Teams

- BEAT Cycling
- EvoPro Racing

== Race summary ==
Due to strong winds and some crashes, the peloton split into echelons early on, with 14 riders in the lead group being chased by a slightly bigger group of riders in a second group and the rest of the bunch about two minutes down. The two groups in front eventually merged and included most of the sprinters on board, with the most notable absentees Elia Viviani and Timothy Dupont, causing their teams (Cofidis & Bingoal Pauwels Sauces WB) to lead the chase in the peloton. The peloton would however never return to the front, with the gap staying above 1 minute until the finish. From the lead group, Alexander Kristoff and Tim Merlier were dropped following a crash, which left a group of 30 riders in which mainly Bora–Hansgrohe and Deceuninck–Quick-Step were pulling as they each had no less than five riders present including their sprinters. The group consisted of Ackermann, Marcus Burghardt, Nils Politt, Michael Schwarzmann & Rüdiger Selig (Bora–Hansgrohe), Bennett, Cavendish, Michael Mørkøv, Florian Sénéchal & Bert Van Lerberghe (Deceuninck–Quick-Step), Dries De Bondt, Philipsen & Jonas Rickaert (Alpecin–Fenix), Luuc Bugter, Piotr Havik & Jan-Willem van Schip (BEAT Cycling), Stan Dewulf & Marc Sarreau (AG2R Citroën Team), Jonas Koch & Danny van Poppel (Intermarché–Wanty–Gobert Matériaux), Giacomo Nizzolo & Max Walscheid (Team Qhubeka Assos), Clément Russo (Arkéa–Samsic), Dries Van Gestel (Total Direct Énergie), Cees Bol (Team DSM), Søren Wærenskjold (Uno-X Pro Cycling Team), Brent Van Moer (Lotto–Soudal), Norman Vahtra (Israel Start-Up Nation), Evaldas Šiškevičius (Delko) and Luca Mozzato (B&B Hotels p/b KTM).

No real attacks came from the group, which thus led to a group sprint. There seemed to be some confusion at Deceuninck–Quick-Step whether to opt for Bennett or Cavendish to prepare the lead out for and when a strong Alpecin–Fenix train passed them it was Jasper Philipsen who was able to win the sprint comfortably with teammates Bennett and Cavendish both on the podium beside him.

== Result ==
Result
Rank	Rider	Team	Time
1	Jasper Philipsen (BEL)	Alpecin–Fenix	4h 03' 30"
2	Sam Bennett (IRL)	Deceuninck–Quick-Step	+ 0"
3	Mark Cavendish (GBR)	Deceuninck–Quick-Step	+ 0"
4	Danny van Poppel (NED)	Intermarché–Wanty–Gobert Matériaux	+ 0"
5	Clément Russo (FRA)	Arkéa–Samsic	+ 0"
6	Pascal Ackermann (GER)	Bora–Hansgrohe	+ 0"
7	Luca Mozzato (ITA)	B&B Hotels p/b KTM	+ 0"
8	Giacomo Nizzolo (ITA)	Team Qhubeka Assos	+ 0"
9	Marc Sarreau (FRA)	AG2R Citroën Team	+ 0"
10	Dries Van Gestel (BEL)	Total Direct Énergie	+ 0"
