= Phil Bauhaus =

German cyclist (born 1994)

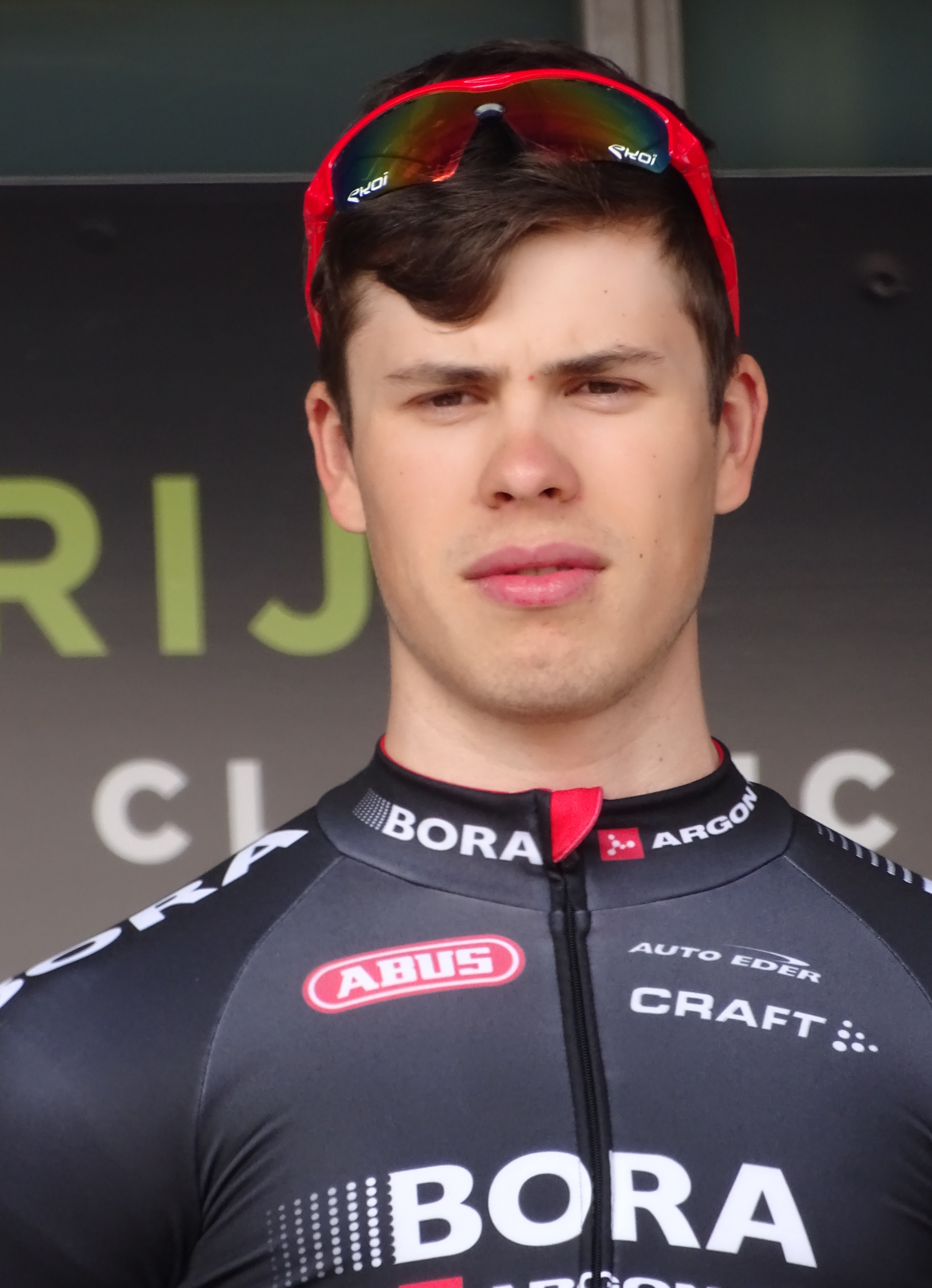
- Bauhaus at the 2015 Scheldeprijs

Personal information
- Full name: Phil Bauhaus
- Born: 8 July 1994 (age 32) Bocholt, Germany
- Height: 1.84 m (6 ft 0 in)
- Weight: 71 kg (157 lb)

Cycling career
- Sport: Cycling
- Current team: Team Bahrain Victorious
- Discipline: Road
- Role: Rider
- Rider type: Sprinter

Amateur team
- 2004–2012: RC 77 Bocholt

Professional teams
- 2013–2014: Team Stölting
- 2015–2016: Bora–Argon 18
- 2017–2018: Team Sunweb
- 2019–: Bahrain–Merida

Phil Bauhaus (born 8 July 1994 in Bocholt) is a German cyclist, who currently rides for UCI WorldTeam Team Bahrain Victorious. A sprinter, Bauhaus has taken more than 20 pro wins in his career, and has finished on the podium of several grand tour stages.

== Career ==
Bauhaus started his elite career with UCI Continental team Team Stölting in 2013. With the team, he obtained his first two professional wins, both stages of the 2014 Volta a Portugal before stepping up to UCI WorldTeam Bora–Argon 18 in 2015. He notably won stage five of the Danmark Rundt in his second year with the team. For the 2017 season, he transferred to Team Sunweb and competed in his first Grand Tour, the Giro d'Italia. He also earned his first win in a UCI World Tour event on stage five of the Critérium du Dauphiné, outsprinting Arnaud Démare. The following year, he took his second World Tour victory on stage three of the Abu Dhabi Tour.

After two seasons with Team Sunweb, he joined Bahrain–Merida for the 2019 season on an initial one-year contract. He entered the 2019 Vuelta a España, but dropped out on stage 9. In his first season with the team, he won the Coppa Bernocchi in September. In 2021, Bauhaus logged seven wins, most notably the first stage of the Tour de Pologne. He took two more World Tour level stage wins in 2022 at Tirreno–Adriatico and again at the Tour de Pologne.

At the beginning of the 2023 season, he won stage one of the Tour Down Under. In July, he entered his first Tour de France, but withdrew from the race on stage 17, after three podiums on previous stages. He was also dealt a 50 point penalty in the points classification for the obstruction of another rider. He started off 2024 with a second place finish on the first stage of the Tour Down Under, before winning stage three of Tirreno–Adriatico in March. In the 2024 Tour de France, his best result was a 2nd place finish on a bunch sprint during stage 16, slightly behind the winner Jasper Philipsen.

== Major results ==
2013
1st Stage 1a Tour of Bulgaria
1st Stage 2 Oder Rundfahrt
6th Kernen Omloop Echt-Susteren
2014 (2 pro wins)
1st Skive Løbet
1st Kernen Omloop Echt-Susteren
Volta a Portugal

1st Stages 1 & 6

1st Stage 5 Baltic Chain Tour
2nd Road race, National Under-23 Road Championships
2nd Zuid Oost Drenthe Classic I
3rd Road race, National Road Championships
3rd Rund um Düren
5th Himmerland Rundt
7th Poreč Trophy
7th Eschborn-Frankfurt City Loop U23
7th Velothon Berlin
8th Destination Thy
8th Omloop van het Houtland
2015
4th Nokere Koerse
2016 (2)
1st Stage 5 Danmark Rundt
1st Stage 1 Tour d'Azerbaïdjan
1st Stage 2 Oberösterreich Rundfahrt
4th Road race, UCI Under-23 Road World Championships
4th Grote Prijs Stad Zottegem
7th Münsterland Giro
8th Rund um Köln
10th Handzame Classic
10th Kattekoers
2017 (1)
1st Stage 5 Critérium du Dauphiné
2nd Münsterland Giro
4th Nokere Koerse
2018 (1)
1st Stage 3 Abu Dhabi Tour
6th London–Surrey Classic
2019 (1)
1st Coppa Bernocchi
1st Stage 1 Adriatica Ionica Race
2020 (3)
1st Overall Tour of Saudi Arabia

1st Stages 3 & 5

2021 (7)
Tour de Hongrie

1st Points classification
1st Stages 1 & 3

Tour of Slovenia

1st Stages 1 & 5

1st Stage 1 Tour de Pologne
1st Stage 4 Tour de la Provence
1st Stage 1 CRO Race
2022 (2)
1st Stage 7 Tirreno–Adriatico
1st Stage 5 Tour de Pologne
4th Eschborn–Frankfurt
7th Hamburg Cyclassics
2023 (1)
1st Stage 1 Tour Down Under
2024 (2)
1st Stage 3 Tirreno–Adriatico
1st Stage 2 Tour of Slovenia
8th Classic Brugge–De Panne
2025
4th Classic Brugge–De Panne
8th Copenhagen Sprint
8th Kampioenschap van Vlaanderen
2026
5th Clásica de Almería
5th Ronde van Limburg

=== Grand Tour general classification results timeline ===
Grand Tour	2017	2018	2019	2020	2021	2022	2023	2024	2025	2026
Giro d'Italia	DNF	—	—	—	—	138	—	DNF	—	—
Tour de France	—	—	—	—	—	—	DNF	DNF	151	154
Vuelta a España	—	—	DNF	—	—	—	—	—	—	

Legend
—	Did not compete
DNF	Did not finish
IP	Race in Progress
