= 2021 Eschborn–Frankfurt =

One-day cycling race in Germany

2021 UCI World Tour, race 27 of 29

Race details
- Dates: 19 September 2021
- Stages: 1
- Distance: 187.5 km (116.5 mi)
- Winning time: 4h 28' 03"

Results
	Winner	Jasper Philipsen (BEL)	(Alpecin–Fenix)
	Second	John Degenkolb (GER)	(Lotto–Soudal)
	Third	Alexander Kristoff (NOR)	(UAE Team Emirates)
	Mountains	Simone Velasco (ITA)	(Gazprom–RusVelo)

The 2021 Eschborn–Frankfurt was a road cycling one-day race that took place on 19 September 2021 in the Frankfurt Rhein-Main metro area in southwest Germany. It was the 58th edition of Eschborn–Frankfurt and the 27th event of the 2021 UCI World Tour. The race returned to the UCI World Tour calendar after the 2020 edition was cancelled due to the COVID-19 pandemic. Traditionally, the race takes place on 1 May, the Labour Day holiday in Germany, but it was postponed due to COVID-19 precautions.

The race covered 187.5 kilometres (116.5 mi) and about 3,200 metres (10,500 ft) of elevation. It started in Eschborn, on the outskirts of Frankfurt. After entering Frankfurt and riding around most of the finishing circuit, the race traveled northwest through Oberursel into the Taunus to take on several hills. The Feldberg, the first of these hills, was also the longest at 11 kilometres (6.8 mi) long, with an average gradient of 4.8 percent. The riders then took on almost two laps of a larger circuit and almost four laps of a smaller circuit around Kronberg im Taunus, climbing the Ruppertshain twice and the Mammolshain four times. From there, the race passed through the start line in Eschborn again before finishing with almost three complete laps of a 5.5-kilometre (3.4 mi) technical circuit in Frankfurt near the Main River. In addition to the general classification, there was also a mountains classification, with points available at the top of each of the eight climbs, and three sprint points, each of which offered a monetary prize to the first rider across the line.

== Teams ==
13 of the 19 UCI WorldTeams and five UCI ProTeams made up the twenty teams that participated in the race. Arkéa–Samsic, with six riders, was the only team to not enter a full squad of seven riders. In total, 139 riders started the race, of which 91 finished.

UCI WorldTeams

- AG2R Citroën Team
- Bora–Hansgrohe
- Cofidis
- Intermarché–Wanty–Gobert Matériaux
- Israel Start-Up Nation
- Lotto–Soudal
- Movistar Team
- Team Bahrain Victorious
- Team BikeExchange
- Team DSM
- Team Jumbo–Visma
- Trek–Segafredo
- UAE Team Emirates

UCI ProTeams

- Alpecin–Fenix
- Arkéa–Samsic
- B&B Hotels p/b KTM
- Bingoal Pauwels Sauces WB
- Gazprom–RusVelo
- Sport Vlaanderen–Baloise
- Uno-X Pro Cycling Team

== Result ==
Result
Rank	Rider	Team	Time
1	Jasper Philipsen (BEL)	Alpecin–Fenix	4h 28' 03"
2	John Degenkolb (GER)	Lotto–Soudal	+ 0"
3	Alexander Kristoff (NOR)	UAE Team Emirates	+ 0"
4	Andrea Pasqualon (ITA)	Intermarché–Wanty–Gobert Matériaux	+ 0"
5	Pascal Ackermann (GER)	Bora–Hansgrohe	+ 0"
6	Iván García Cortina (ESP)	Movistar Team	+ 0"
7	Christophe Laporte (FRA)	Cofidis	+ 0"
8	Mike Teunissen (NED)	Team Jumbo–Visma	+ 0"
9	Michael Matthews (AUS)	Team BikeExchange	+ 0"
10	Fred Wright (GBR)	Team Bahrain Victorious	+ 0"

Mountains classification
Rank	Rider	Team	Points
1	Simone Velasco (ITA)	Gazprom–RusVelo	21
2	Luke Durbridge (AUS)	Team BikeExchange	10
3	Mathias Norsgaard (DEN)	Movistar Team	7
4	Gianluca Brambilla (ITA)	Trek–Segafredo	5
5	Michael Matthews (AUS)	Team BikeExchange	2
6	Cristian Scaroni (ITA)	Gazprom–RusVelo	1
7	Erik Resell (NOR)	Uno-X Pro Cycling Team	1
8	Ben Hermans (BEL)	Israel Start-Up Nation	1
