= 2026 Nokere Koerse =

2026 UCI ProSeries

Race details
- Dates: 18 March 2026
- Stages: 1
- Distance: 186.4 km (115.8 mi)

Results
	Winner	Jasper Philipsen (BEL)	(Alpecin–Premier Tech)
	Second	Jordi Meeus (BEL)	(Red Bull–Bora–Hansgrohe)
	Third	Juan Sebastián Molano (COL)	(UAE Team Emirates XRG)

The 2026 Danilith Nokere Koerse was the 80th edition of the Nokere Koerse one-day road cycling race. It was held on 18 March 2026 as a category 1.Pro race on the 2026 UCI ProSeries calendar.

== Teams ==
13 of the 18 UCI WorldTeams, eight UCI ProTeams, and one UCI Continental team made up the 22 teams that participated in the race.

UCI WorldTeams

- Alpecin–Premier Tech
- Groupama–FDJ United
- Lidl–Trek
- Lotto–Intermarché
- NSN Cycling Team
- Red Bull–Bora–Hansgrohe
- Soudal–Quick-Step
- Team Bahrain Victorious
- Team Jayco–AlUla
- Team Picnic–PostNL
- UAE Team Emirates XRG
- Uno-X Mobility
- XDS Astana Team

UCI ProTeams

- Caja Rural–Seguros RGA
- Cofidis
- Modern Adventure Pro Cycling
- Pinarello–Q36.5 Pro Cycling Team
- Team Flanders–Baloise
- Team TotalEnergies
- Tudor Pro Cycling Team
- Unibet Rose Rockets

UCI Continental Teams

- Tarteletto–Isorex

== Result ==
Result (1–10)
Rank	Rider	Team	Time
1	Jasper Philipsen (BEL)	Alpecin–Premier Tech	3h 48' 45"
2	Jordi Meeus (BEL)	Red Bull–Bora–Hansgrohe	+ 0"
3	Juan Sebastián Molano (COL)	UAE Team Emirates XRG	+ 0"
4	Emilien Jeannière (FRA)	Team TotalEnergies	+ 0"
5	Milan Menten (BEL)	Lotto–Intermarché	+ 0"
6	Lukáš Kubiš (SVK)	Unibet Rose Rockets	+ 0"
7	Jenthe Biermans (BEL)	Cofidis	+ 0"
8	Paul Penhoët (FRA)	Groupama–FDJ United	+ 0"
9	Steffen De Schuyteneer (BEL)	Lotto–Intermarché	+ 0"
10	António Morgado (POR)	UAE Team Emirates XRG	+ 0"
