= 2022 Scheldeprijs =

2022 UCI ProSeries
- Event poster with previous winners Jasper Philipsen and Lorena Wiebes

Race details
- Dates: 6 April 2022
- Stages: 1
- Distance: 194.2 km (120.7 mi)
- Winning time: 4h 06' 02"

Results
	Winner	Alexander Kristoff (NOR)	(Intermarché–Wanty–Gobert Matériaux)
	Second	Danny van Poppel (NED)	(Bora–Hansgrohe)
	Third	Sam Welsford (AUS)	(Team DSM)

The 2022 Scheldeprijs was the 110th edition of the Scheldeprijs road cycling one day race, which was held on 6 April 2022. It was a 1.Pro event on the 2022 UCI ProSeries. The race, which was 198.7 kilometres (123.5 mi) long, started in Terneuzen in the Netherlands and traveled through the windy fields of Zeeland before crossing the border into Belgium and finishing in Schoten on the outskirts of Antwerp.

The Scheldeprijs is known as a race that particularly suits the sprinters as it includes several cobbled roads but no significant climbs. However, the race was won in an unusual solo victory by Alexander Kristoff riding for Intermarché–Wanty–Gobert Matériaux, when he attacked 7.4 kilometers from the finish and was able to distance the chasing group due to a strong headwind. Danny van Poppel (Bora–Hansgrohe) outsprinted Sam Welsford (Team DSM) for second, finishing 24 seconds behind Kristoff.

== Teams ==
Nine of the eighteen UCI WorldTeams, nine UCI ProTeams, and three UCI Continental teams made up the twenty-one teams that participated in the race. Only 30 riders finished the race.

UCI WorldTeams

- Bora–Hansgrohe
- Cofidis
- Intermarché–Wanty–Gobert Matériaux
- Lotto–Soudal
- Team BikeExchange–Jayco
- Team DSM
- Trek–Segafredo
- Quick-Step Alpha Vinyl Team
- UAE Team Emirates

UCI ProTeams

- Alpecin–Fenix
- Arkéa–Samsic
- B&B Hotels–KTM
- Bardiani–CSF–Faizanè
- Bingoal Pauwels Sauces WB
- Sport Vlaanderen–Baloise
- Team Novo Nordisk
- Team TotalEnergies
- Uno-X Pro Cycling Team

UCI Continental Teams

- BEAT Cycling
- EvoPro Racing
- Minerva Cycling Team

== Result ==
Result
Rank	Rider	Team	Time
1	Alexander Kristoff (NOR)	Intermarché–Wanty–Gobert Matériaux	4h 06' 02"
2	Danny van Poppel (NED)	Bora–Hansgrohe	+ 24"
3	Sam Welsford (AUS)	Team DSM	+ 24"
4	Casper van Uden (NED)	Team DSM	+ 26"
5	Edward Theuns (BEL)	Trek–Segafredo	+ 26"
6	Kenneth Vanbilsen (BEL)	Cofidis	+ 28"
7	Daniel McLay (GBR)	Arkéa–Samsic	+ 28"
8	Jasper Philipsen (BEL)	Alpecin–Fenix	+ 28"
9	Tim Merlier (BEL)	Alpecin–Fenix	+ 28"
10	Ryan Mullen (IRL)	Bora–Hansgrohe	+ 28"
