= Jason Tesson =

French cyclist

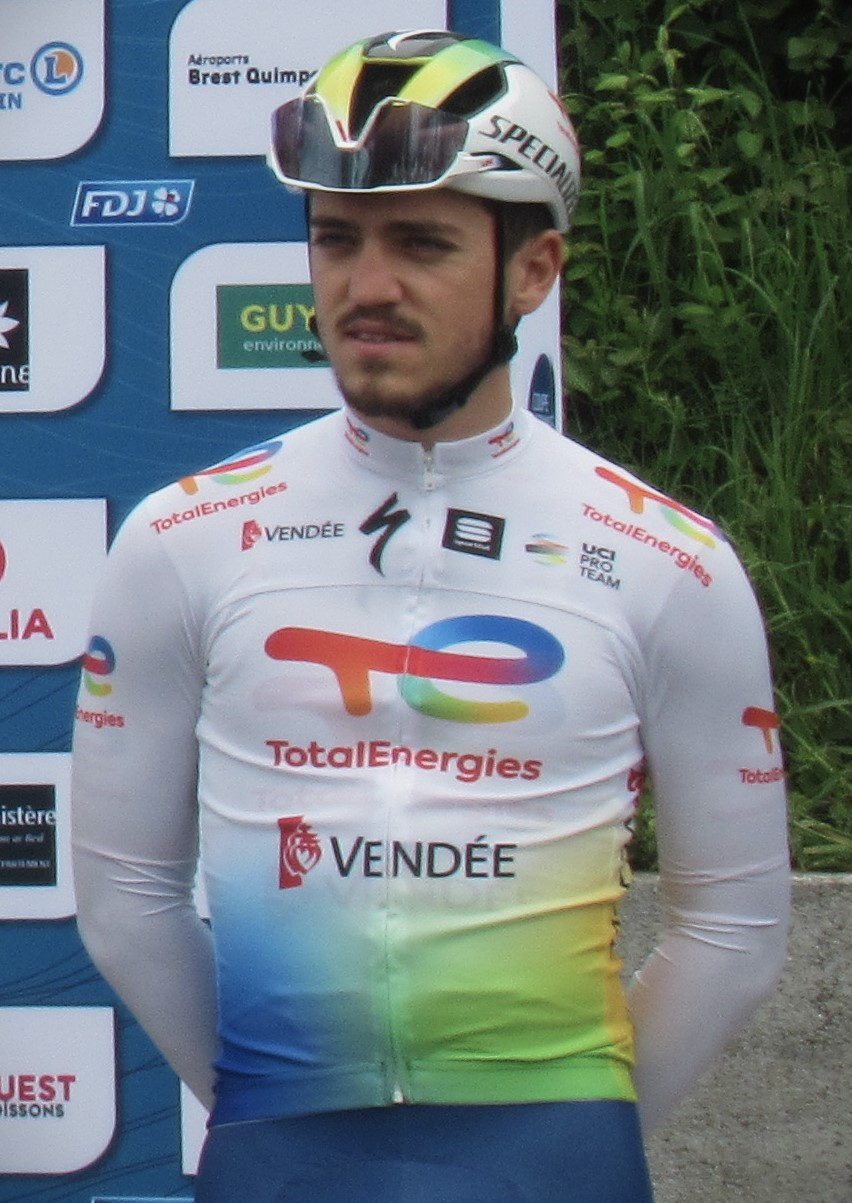
- Tesson in 2023

Personal information
- Born: 9 January 1998 (age 28) Angers, France
- Height: 1.66 m (5 ft 5 in)
- Weight: 59 kg (130 lb)

Cycling career
- Sport: Cycling
- Current team: Team TotalEnergies
- Discipline: Road
- Role: Rider
- Rider type: Sprinter

Amateur teams
- 2012–2017: VS Valletais
- 2018–2020: Sojasun espoir–ACNC
- 2020: Rally Cycling (stagiaire)

Professional teams
- 2021–2022: St. Michel–Auber93
- 2023–: Team TotalEnergies

Jason Tesson (born 9 January 1998) is a French cyclist, who currently rides for UCI ProTeam Team TotalEnergies.

He had his first professional victory in 2021, when he won stage 2 of the Tour Poitou-Charentes en Nouvelle-Aquitaine in a sprint ahead of Elia Viviani.

== Major results ==
2019
2nd Grand Prix de la ville de Pérenchies
2020
1st Road race, National Amateur Road Championships
4th Paris–Tours Espoirs
6th Road race, UEC European Under-23 Road Championships
7th Grand Prix de la Ville de Lillers
2021 (1 pro win)
1st Overall À travers les Hauts-de-France

1st Stage 1

1st Stage 2 Tour Poitou-Charentes en Nouvelle-Aquitaine
2nd Grand Prix de la Somme
3rd Route Adélie
4th Grand Prix du Morbihan
6th Grand Prix de la ville de Pérenchies
6th Paris–Chauny
8th Grand Prix de Fourmies
8th Paris–Bourges
2022 (2)
Four Days of Dunkirk

1st Points classification
1st Stage 2

1st Stage 1 Boucles de la Mayenne
3rd Overall Ronde de l'Oise

1st Points classification
1st Stages 3 & 4

3rd Grand Prix de la Ville de Lillers
3rd Paris–Chauny
4th Cholet-Pays de la Loire
5th Grand Prix de Fourmies
2023 (3)
La Tropicale Amissa Bongo

1st Stages 2 & 3

1st Stage 2 Route d'Occitanie
2nd Paris–Chauny
4th Grand Prix d'Isbergues
8th Clásica de Almería
10th Grand Prix de Fourmies
10th Paris–Bourges
2024 (2)
1st La Roue Tourangelle
1st Stage 4 Tour of Taihu Lake
4th Classic Brugge–De Panne
5th Paris–Chauny
6th Cholet-Pays de la Loire
7th Clásica de Almería
10th Omloop van het Houtland
2025 (1)
1st Stage 1 Tour Poitou-Charentes en Nouvelle-Aquitaine
3rd Grand Prix d'Isbergues
9th Kampioenschap van Vlaanderen
2026 (2)
1st Classic Var
1st Stage 2 Tour Poitou-Charentes en Nouvelle-Aquitaine
4th Grand Prix d'Isbergues
8th Copenhagen Sprint
8th Tour de Vendée
9th Bredene Koksijde Classic
10th Kampioenschap van Vlaanderen
