= 2024 Classic Brugge–De Panne =

Cycling race

2024 UCI World Tour, race 10 of 35

Race details
- Dates: 20 March 2024
- Stages: 1
- Distance: 198.9 km (123.6 mi)
- Winning time: 4h 22' 42"

Results
	Winner	Jasper Philipsen (BEL)	(Alpecin–Deceuninck)
	Second	Tim Merlier (BEL)	(Soudal–Quick-Step)
	Third	Danny van Poppel (NED)	(Bora–Hansgrohe)

The 2024 Classic Brugge–De Panne was a road cycling one-day race that took place on 20 March in Belgium. It was the 48th edition of the Three Days of Bruges–De Panne.

== Teams ==
Twenty-three teams were invited to the race, including sixteen UCI WorldTeams and seven UCI ProTeams. All but one team, Astana Qazaqstan Team, entered the maximum allowed seven riders.

UCI WorldTeams

- Alpecin–Deceuninck
- Arkéa–B&B Hotels
- Astana Qazaqstan Team
- Bora–Hansgrohe
- Cofidis
- Decathlon–AG2R La Mondiale
- EF Education–EasyPost
- Groupama–FDJ
- Intermarché–Wanty
- Lidl–Trek
- Movistar Team
- Soudal–Quick-Step
- Team Bahrain Victorious
- Team dsm–firmenich PostNL
- Team Jayco–AlUla
- UAE Team Emirates

UCI ProTeams

- Bingoal WB
- Israel–Premier Tech
- Lotto–Dstny
- Q36.5 Pro Cycling Team
- Team Flanders–Baloise
- Team TotalEnergies
- Tudor Pro Cycling Team
- Uno-X Mobility

== Summary ==
Jasper Philipsen of Alpecin–Deceuninck, who recently triumphed in Milan–San Remo, participated in the race, aiming to excel once again on the flat terrain suitable for sprinters like him.

From the start, a breakaway formed without much opposition from the peloton, consisting of Luca De Meester (Bingoal WB), Victor Vercouille (Team Flanders–Baloise), and Thomas Gachignard (Team TotalEnergies).

Their advantage grew to over four minutes before the chase from the main bunch intensified, with teams like Bora–Hansgrohe, Soudal–Quick-Step, Team Jayco–AlUla, and Alpecin–Deceuninck working together to reel them in.

As the kilometers passed, the gap gradually shrank, falling below a minute with 31km remaining. Gachignard made a solo break at 24km to go but was eventually caught with 21km left, as the peloton absorbed De Meester and Vercouille.

Despite being visible to the peloton, Gachignard was allowed some leeway, extending his lead to over 30 seconds. However, his advantage dwindled with 10km to go.

In the final phase of the race, Danny van Poppel had to navigate back to the front after briefly veering off-course. Soudal–Quick-Step controlled the pace into the last 500 meters before Lidl–Trek initiated the sprint.

While Sam Welsford surged ahead, Philipsen demonstrated his skill by timing his sprint perfectly, securing the victory.

== Result ==
Result (1–10)
Rank	Rider	Team	Time
1	Jasper Philipsen (BEL)	Alpecin–Deceuninck	4h 22' 42"
2	Tim Merlier (BEL)	Soudal–Quick-Step	+ 0"
3	Danny van Poppel (NED)	Bora–Hansgrohe	+ 0"
4	Jason Tesson (FRA)	Team TotalEnergies	+ 0"
5	Simone Consonni (ITA)	Lidl–Trek	+ 0"
6	Stian Fredheim (NOR)	Uno-X Mobility	+ 0"
7	Juan Sebastián Molano (COL)	UAE Team Emirates	+ 0"
8	Phil Bauhaus (GER)	Team Bahrain Victorious	+ 0"
9	Emilien Jeannière (FRA)	Team TotalEnergies	+ 0"
10	Luca Mozzato (ITA)	Arkéa–B&B Hotels	+ 0"
