= 2025 Kuurne–Brussels–Kuurne =

2025 UCI ProSeries
- Event poster

Race details
- Dates: 2 March 2025
- Stages: 1
- Distance: 196.9 km (122.3 mi)
- Winning time: 4h 26' 30"

Results
	Winner	Jasper Philipsen (BEL)	(Alpecin–Deceuninck)
	Second	Olav Kooij (NED)	(Visma–Lease a Bike)
	Third	Hugo Hofstetter (FRA)	(Israel–Premier Tech)

The 2025 Kuurne–Brussels–Kuurne was the 77th edition of the Kuurne–Brussels–Kuurne cycling classic. It was held on 2 March 2025 as a category 1.Pro race on the 2025 UCI ProSeries.

== Teams ==
Twenty-five teams participated in the race, including seventeen of the eighteen UCI WorldTeams and eight UCI ProTeams.

UCI WorldTeams

- Alpecin–Deceuninck
- Arkéa–B&B Hotels
- Cofidis
- Decathlon–AG2R La Mondiale
- EF Education–EasyPost
- Groupama–FDJ
- Intermarché–Wanty
- Lidl–Trek
- Movistar Team
- Red Bull–Bora–Hansgrohe
- Soudal–Quick-Step
- Team Bahrain Victorious
- Team Jayco–AlUla
- Team Picnic PostNL
- UAE Team Emirates XRG
- Visma–Lease a Bike
- XDS Astana Team

UCI ProTeams

- Israel–Premier Tech
- Lotto
- Q36.5 Pro Cycling Team
- Team Flanders–Baloise
- Tudor Pro Cycling Team
- Unibet Tietema Rockets
- Uno-X Mobility
- Wagner Bazin WB

== Result ==
Result
Rank	Rider	Team	Time
1	Jasper Philipsen (BEL)	Alpecin–Deceuninck	4h 26' 30"
2	Olav Kooij (NED)	Visma–Lease a Bike	+ 0"
3	Hugo Hofstetter (FRA)	Israel–Premier Tech	+ 0"
4	Arne Marit (BEL)	Intermarché–Wanty	+ 0"
5	Rick Pluimers (NED)	Tudor Pro Cycling Team	+ 0"
6	Jonathan Milan (ITA)	Lidl–Trek	+ 0"
7	Marijn van den Berg (NED)	EF Education–EasyPost	+ 0"
8	Pavel Bittner (CZE)	Team Picnic PostNL	+ 0"
9	Lukáš Kubiš (SVK)	Unibet Tietema Rockets	+ 0"
10	Milan Fretin (BEL)	Cofidis	+ 0"
