= 2022 Hamburg Cyclassics =

Cycling race

2022 Bemer Cyclassics
2022 UCI World Tour, race 27

Race details
- Dates: 21 August 2022
- Stages: 1
- Distance: 204.7 km (127.2 mi)
- Winning time: 4h 37' 23"

Results
	Winner	Marco Haller (AUT)	(Bora–Hansgrohe)
	Second	Wout van Aert (BEL)	(Team Jumbo–Visma)
	Third	Quinten Hermans (BEL)	(Intermarché–Wanty–Gobert Matériaux)

The 2022 Bemer Cyclassics was a road cycling one-day race that took place on 21 August 2022 in Germany. It was the 24th edition of EuroEyes Cyclassics and the 27th event of the 2022 UCI World Tour. It was won by Marco Haller in the sprint.

== Teams ==
All eighteen UCI WorldTeams and three UCI ProTeams made up the twenty-one teams that participated in the race.

UCI WorldTeams

- AG2R Citroën Team
- Astana Qazaqstan Team
- Bora–Hansgrohe
- Cofidis
- EF Education–EasyPost
- Groupama–FDJ
- Ineos Grenadiers
- Intermarché–Wanty–Gobert Matériaux
- Israel–Premier Tech
- Lotto–Soudal
- Movistar Team
- Quick-Step Alpha Vinyl Team
- Team Bahrain Victorious
- Team BikeExchange–Jayco
- Team DSM
- Team Jumbo–Visma
- Trek–Segafredo
- UAE Team Emirates

UCI ProTeams

- Alpecin–Deceuninck
- Arkéa–Samsic
- Team TotalEnergies

== Result ==
Result
Rank	Rider	Team	Time
1	Marco Haller (AUT)	Bora–Hansgrohe	4h 37’ 23"
2	Wout van Aert (BEL)	Team Jumbo–Visma	+ 0"
3	Quinten Hermans (BEL)	Intermarché–Wanty–Gobert Matériaux	+ 0"
4	Jhonatan Narváez (ECU)	Ineos Grenadiers	+ 0"
5	Patrick Konrad (AUT)	Bora–Hansgrohe	+ 4"
6	Jasper Philipsen (BEL)	Alpecin–Deceuninck	+ 9"
7	Phil Bauhaus (GER)	Team Bahrain Victorious	+ 9"
8	Hugo Hofstetter (FRA)	Arkéa–Samsic	+ 9"
9	Max Kanter (GER)	Movistar Team	+ 9"
10	Alexander Kristoff (NOR)	Intermarché–Wanty–Gobert Matériaux	+ 9"
