= 2023 Classic Brugge–De Panne =

Cycling race

2023 UCI World Tour, race 10 of 35

Race details
- Dates: 22 March 2023
- Stages: 1
- Distance: 211.2 km (131.2 mi)
- Winning time: 4h 38' 52"

Results
	Winner	Jasper Philipsen (BEL)	(Alpecin–Deceuninck)
	Second	Olav Kooij (NED)	(Team Jumbo–Visma)
	Third	Yves Lampaert (BEL)	(Soudal–Quick-Step)

The 2023 Classic Brugge–De Panne (known as Minerva Classic Brugge–De Panne for sponsorship reasons) was a road cycling one-day race that took place on 22 March 2023 in Belgium. It was the 47th edition of the Three Days of Bruges–De Panne, and the 10th event of the 2022 UCI World Tour.

== Teams ==
Twenty-two teams were invited to the race, including sixteen UCI WorldTeams and six UCI ProTeams. All but three teams entered the maximum allowed seven riders.

UCI WorldTeams

- Alpecin–Deceuninck
- Arkéa–Samsic
- Astana Qazaqstan Team
- Bora–Hansgrohe
- Cofidis
- EF Education–EasyPost
- Groupama–FDJ
- Intermarché–Circus–Wanty
- Movistar Team
- Soudal–Quick-Step
- Team Bahrain Victorious
- Team Jayco–AlUla
- Team DSM
- Team Jumbo–Visma
- Trek–Segafredo
- UAE Team Emirates

UCI ProTeams

- Bingoal WB
- Israel–Premier Tech
- Lotto–Dstny
- Team Flanders–Baloise
- Team TotalEnergies
- Uno-X Pro Cycling Team

== Result ==
Result (1–10)
Rank	Rider	Team	Time
1	Jasper Philipsen (BEL)	Alpecin–Deceuninck	4h 38' 52"
2	Olav Kooij (NED)	Team Jumbo–Visma	+ 0"
3	Yves Lampaert (BEL)	Soudal–Quick-Step	+ 0"
4	Frederik Frison (BEL)	Lotto–Dstny	+ 1"
5	Fabio Jakobsen (NED)	Soudal–Quick-Step	+ 21"
6	Jonas Rickaert (BEL)	Alpecin–Deceuninck	+ 21"
7	Cédric Beullens (BEL)	Lotto–Dstny	+ 21"
8	Stian Fredheim (NOR)	Uno-X Pro Cycling Team	+ 21"
9	Juan Sebastián Molano (COL)	UAE Team Emirates	+ 21"
10	Marijn van den Berg (NED)	EF Education–EasyPost	+ 21"
