= Stian Fredheim =

Norwegian cyclist

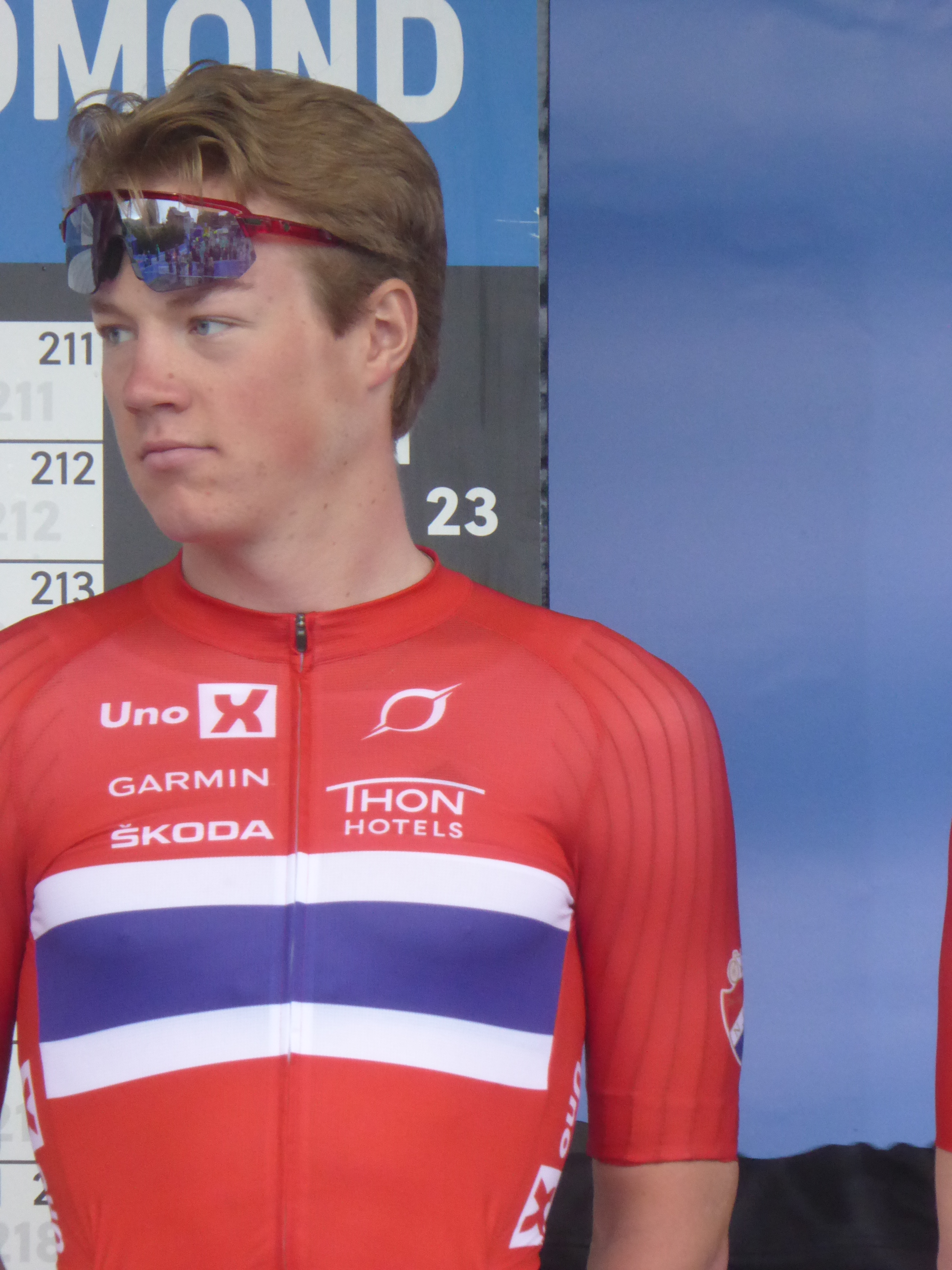

Personal information
- Full name: Stian Edvardsen-Fredheim
- Born: 23 March 2003 (age 23) Kristiansand, Norway
- Height: 1.83 m (6 ft 0 in)
- Weight: 72 kg (159 lb; 11 st 5 lb)

Cycling career
- Sport: Cycling
- Current team: Uno-X Mobility
- Discipline: Road
- Role: Rider
- Rider type: Classics rider

Amateur team
- 2020–2021: Glåmdal SK

Professional teams
- 2022: Uno-X Dare Development Team
- 2023–: Uno-X Pro Cycling Team

Stian Edvardsen-Fredheim (born 23 March 2003) is a Norwegian racing cyclist, who currently rides for UCI ProTeam Uno-X Mobility.

== Career ==
As a junior cyclist Fredheim won the junior edition of Paris–Roubaix Juniors the Paris–Roubaix in a three-man sprint.

He placed third in the final stage of the Olympia's Tour to get secure himself sixth overall.

In 2022 he signed a contract to ride for UCI ProTeam Uno-X Pro Cycling Team in 2023. At the 2023 Classic Brugge–De Panne he made it into the select few riders who made a move off the front of the peloton. On the final lap four riders got away with Fredheim missing the move but sprinted to eighth in the race.

== Major results ==
2020
National Junior Road Championships

1st Criterium
3rd Team time trial

2021
1st Paris–Roubaix Juniors
1st Stage 2 Grand Prix Rüebliland
2nd Overall One Belt One Road Nation's Cup Hungary
5th Time trial, National Junior Road Championships
9th Overall Course de la Paix Juniors

1st Points classification
1st Stage 1

2022
3rd Overall Le Triptyque des Monts et Châteaux
4th Ringerike GP
6th Overall Olympia's Tour
2023
8th Classic Brugge–De Panne
2024
6th Classic Brugge–De Panne
10th Gooikse Pijl
2025 (1 pro win)
1st Route Adélie de Vitré
2nd Grote Prijs Jean-Pierre Monseré
6th Le Samyn
6th Gooikse Pijl
8th Bredene Koksijde Classic
9th La Roue Tourangelle
10th Muscat Classic
