= 2025 Münsterland Giro =

- 2025 UCI ProSeries

Race details
- Dates: 3 October 2025
- Stages: 1
- Distance: 192 km (119.3 mi)
- Winning time: 4h 10' 52"

Results
	Winner	Jasper Philipsen (BEL)	(Alpecin–Deceuninck)
	Second	Arnaud De Lie (BEL)	(Lotto)
	Third	Pavel Bittner (CZE)	(Team Picnic–PostNL)

The 2025 Münsterland Giro (known as the Sparkasse Münsterland Giro for sponsorship reasons) was the 19th edition of the Münsterland Giro road cycling one day race, held mostly in the titular region of northwest Germany on 3 October 2025.

== Teams ==
Twelve UCI WorldTeams, nine UCI ProTeams, and three UCI Continental teams made up the twenty-four teams that participated in the race.

UCI WorldTeams

- Alpecin–Deceuninck
- Arkéa–B&B Hotels
- Cofidis
- EF Education–EasyPost
- Intermarché–Wanty
- Lidl–Trek
- Red Bull–Bora–Hansgrohe
- Soudal–Quick-Step
- Team Picnic–PostNL
- Team Jayco–AlUla
- Visma–Lease a Bike
- XDS Astana Team

UCI ProTeams

- Israel–Premier Tech
- Lotto
- Q36.5 Pro Cycling Team
- Team Flanders–Baloise
- Team Novo Nordisk
- Team TotalEnergies
- Tudor Pro Cycling Team
- Unibet Tietema Rockets
- Uno-X Mobility

UCI Continental Teams

- Benotti Berthold
- Bike Aid
- REMBE / rad-net

== Result ==
Result
Rank	Rider	Team	Time
1	Jasper Philipsen (BEL)	Alpecin–Deceuninck	4h 10' 52"
2	Arnaud De Lie (BEL)	Lotto	+ 0"
3	Pavel Bittner (CZE)	Team Picnic–PostNL	+ 0"
4	Jordi Meeus (BEL)	Red Bull–Bora–Hansgrohe	+ 0"
5	Lukáš Kubiš (SVK)	Unibet Tietema Rockets	+ 0"
6	Anthony Turgis (FRA)	Team TotalEnergies	+ 0"
7	Matteo Moschetti (ITA)	Q36.5 Pro Cycling Team	+ 0"
8	Alberto Dainese (ITA)	Tudor Pro Cycling Team	+ 0"
9	Madis Mihkels (EST)	EF Education–EasyPost	+ 0"
10	Matyáš Kopecký (CZE)	Team Novo Nordisk	+ 0"
