= 2023 Scheldeprijs =

2023 UCI ProSeries
- Event poster with previous winners Lorena Wiebes and Alexander Kristoff

Race details
- Dates: 5 April 2023
- Stages: 1
- Distance: 205.3 km (127.6 mi)
- Winning time: 4h 25' 38"

Results
	Winner	Jasper Philipsen (BEL)	(Alpecin–Deceuninck)
	Second	Sam Welsford (NZL)	(Team DSM)
	Third	Mark Cavendish (GBR)	(Astana Qazaqstan Team)

The 2023 Scheldeprijs was the 111th edition of the Scheldeprijs road cycling one day race, which was held on 5 April 2023. It was a 1.Pro event on the 2023 UCI ProSeries. The race, which was 205.3 kilometres (127.6 mi) long, started in Terneuzen in the Netherlands and finished in Schoten on the outskirts of Antwerp.

== Teams ==
Ten of the eighteen UCI WorldTeams, ten UCI ProTeams, and one UCI Continental team made up the twenty-one teams that participated in the race.

UCI WorldTeams

- Alpecin–Deceuninck
- Arkéa–Samsic
- Astana Qazaqstan Team
- Bora–Hansgrohe
- Cofidis
- Intermarché–Circus–Wanty
- Soudal–Quick-Step
- Team DSM
- Team Jayco–AlUla
- Trek–Segafredo

UCI ProTeams

- Bingoal WB
- Bolton Equities Black Spoke
- Human Powered Health
- Israel–Premier Tech
- Team Flanders–Baloise
- Lotto–Dstny
- Q36.5 Pro Cycling Team
- Team Novo Nordisk
- Team Corratec
- Uno-X Pro Cycling Team

UCI Continental Teams

- BEAT Cycling Club

== Result ==
Result
Rank	Rider	Team	Time
1	Jasper Philipsen (BEL)	Alpecin–Deceuninck	4h 25' 38"
2	Sam Welsford (AUS)	Team DSM	+ 0"
3	Mark Cavendish (GBR)	Astana Qazaqstan Team	+ 0"
4	Dylan Groenewegen (NED)	Team Jayco–AlUla	+ 0"
5	Gerben Thijssen (BEL)	Intermarché–Circus–Wanty	+ 0"
6	Edward Theuns (BEL)	Trek–Segafredo	+ 0"
7	Caleb Ewan (AUS)	Lotto–Dstny	+ 0"
8	Max Walscheid (GER)	Cofidis	+ 0"
9	Itamar Einhorn (ISR)	Israel–Premier Tech	+ 0"
10	Giacomo Nizzolo (ITA)	Israel–Premier Tech	+ 0"
