= 2026 Copenhagen Sprint (men's race) =

Cycling race

2026 UCI World Tour, race 24 of 36
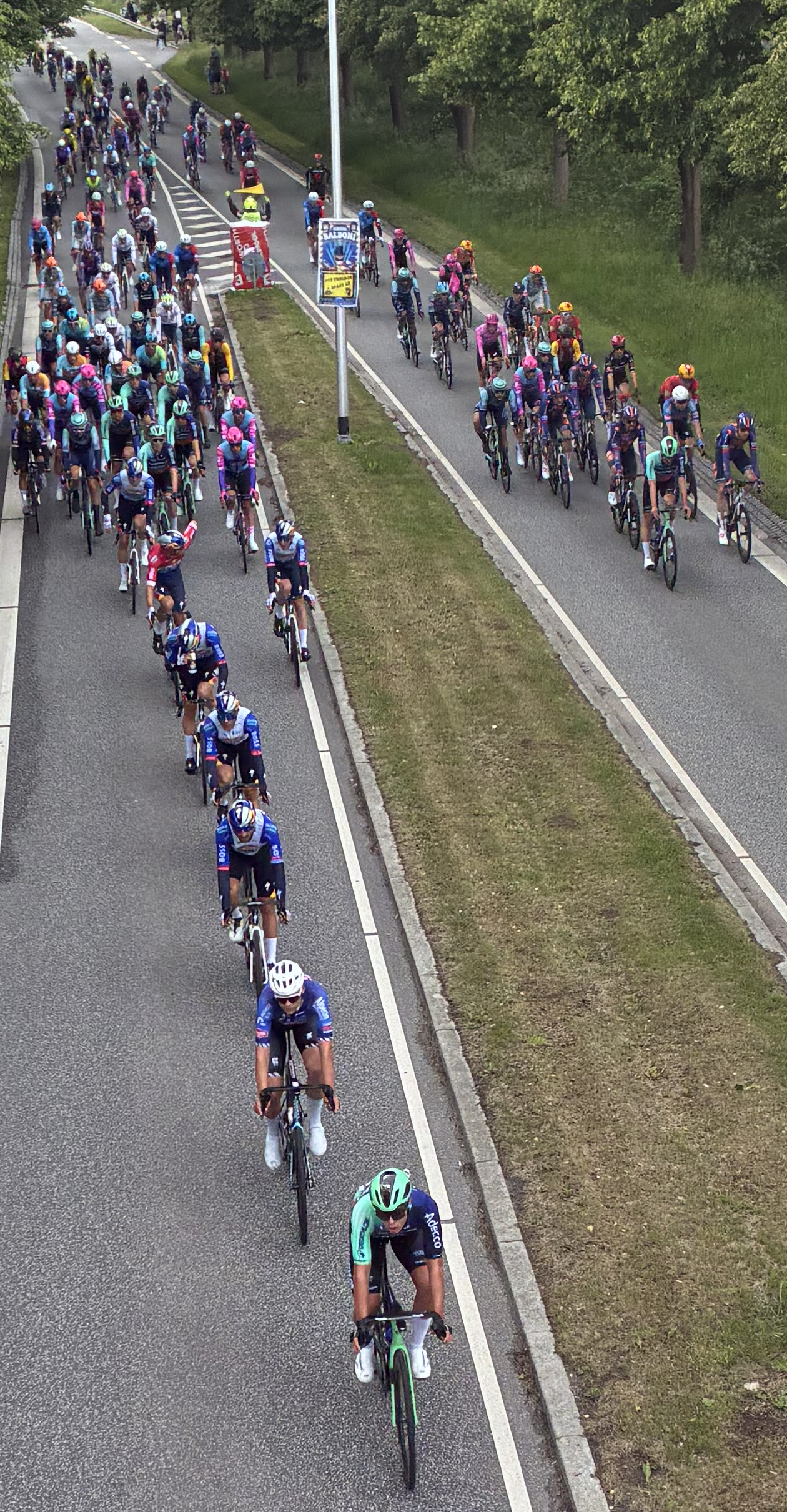
- Peloton in Humlebæk

Race details
- Dates: 14 June 2026
- Distance: 228.2 km (141.8 mi)
- Winning time: 4h 48' 21"

Results
	Winner	Jasper Philipsen (BEL)	(Alpecin–Premier Tech)
	Second	Tobias Lund Andresen (DEN)	(Decathlon CMA CGM)
	Third	Sam Welsford (AUS)	(Netcompany INEOS)

The 2026 Copenhagen Sprint is a Danish road cycling one-day race that took place on 14 June. It was the second edition for men of the Copenhagen Sprint and the 24th event of the 2026 UCI World Tour.

The race was won in a sprint finish by Belgian rider Jasper Philipsen of Alpecin–Premier Tech after catching the breakaway a few hundred metres before the finish line.

== Teams ==
All eighteen UCI WorldTeams, six UCI ProTeams and the Danish national team took part in the race.

UCI WorldTeams

- Alpecin–Premier Tech
- Decathlon CMA CGM
- EF Education–EasyPost
- Groupama–FDJ United
- Lidl–Trek
- Lotto–Intermarché
- Movistar Team
- Netcompany INEOS
- NSN Cycling Team
- Red Bull–Bora–Hansgrohe
- Soudal–Quick-Step
- Team Bahrain Victorious
- Team Jayco–AlUla
- Team Picnic–PostNL
- Visma–Lease a Bike
- UAE Team Emirates XRG
- Uno-X Mobility
- XDS Astana Team

UCI ProTeams

- Cofidis
- Pinarello–Q36.5 Pro Cycling Team
- Team Polti VisitMalta
- Team TotalEnergies
- Tudor Pro Cycling Team
- Unibet Rose Rockets

National teams

- Denmark

== Result ==
Result
Rank	Rider	Team	Time
1	Jasper Philipsen (BEL)	Alpecin–Premier Tech	4h 48' 21"
2	Tobias Lund Andresen (DEN)	Decathlon CMA CGM	+ 0"
3	Sam Welsford (AUS)	Netcompany INEOS	+ 0"
4	Tord Gudmestad (NOR)	Decathlon CMA CGM	+ 0"
5	Danny van Poppel (NED)	Red Bull–Bora–Hansgrohe	+ 0"
6	Max Walscheid (GER)	Lidl–Trek	+ 0"
7	Frits Biesterbos (NED)	Team Picnic–PostNL	+ 0"
8	Jason Tesson (FRA)	Team TotalEnergies	+ 0"
9	Rune Herregodts (BEL)	UAE Team Emirates XRG	+ 0"
10	Søren Kragh Andersen (DEN)	Lidl–Trek	+ 0"
