= 2022 Münsterland Giro =

- 2022 UCI ProSeries

Race details
- Dates: 3 October 2022
- Stages: 1
- Distance: 205.9 km (127.9 mi)
- Winning time: 4h 36' 35"

Results
	Winner	Olav Kooij (NED)	(Team Jumbo–Visma)
	Second	Jasper Philipsen (BEL)	(Alpecin–Deceuninck)
	Third	Max Walscheid (GER)	(Cofidis)

The 2022 Münsterland Giro (known as the Sparkasse Münsterland Giro for sponsorship reasons) was the 16th edition of the Münsterland Giro road cycling one day race, held mostly in the titular region of northwest Germany on 3 October 2022.

== Teams ==
Ten of the 19 UCI WorldTeams, three UCI ProTeams, five UCI Continental teams, and the German national team made up the 19 teams that participated in the race. In total, 117 riders started the race.

UCI WorldTeams

- Bora–Hansgrohe
- Cofidis
- Intermarché–Wanty–Gobert Matériaux
- Israel–Premier Tech
- Lotto–Soudal
- Quick-Step Alpha Vinyl Team
- Team BikeExchange–Jayco
- Team DSM
- Team Jumbo–Visma
- UAE Team Emirates

UCI ProTeams

- Alpecin–Deceuninck
- Sport Vlaanderen–Baloise
- Uno-X Pro Cycling Team

UCI Continental Teams

- Bike Aid
- Metec–Solarwatt p/b Mantel
- Saris Rouvy Sauerland Team
- Team Lotto–Kern Haus
- VolkerWessels Cycling Team

National Teams

- Germany

== Result ==
Result
Rank	Rider	Team	Time
1	Olav Kooij (NED)	Team Jumbo–Visma	4h 36' 35"
2	Jasper Philipsen (BEL)	Alpecin–Deceuninck	+ 0"
3	Max Walscheid (GER)	Cofidis	+ 0"
4	Itamar Einhorn (ISR)	Israel–Premier Tech	+ 0"
5	Sam Bennett (IRL)	Bora–Hansgrohe	+ 0"
6	Fabio Jakobsen (NED)	Quick-Step Alpha Vinyl Team	+ 0"
7	Dylan Groenewegen (NED)	Team BikeExchange–Jayco	+ 0"
8	Casper van Uden (NED)	Team DSM	+ 0"
9	Max Kanter (GER)	Germany	+ 0"
10	Milan Fretin (BEL)	Sport Vlaanderen–Baloise	+ 0"
