= 2024 Münsterland Giro =

- 2024 UCI ProSeries

Race details
- Dates: 3 October 2024
- Stages: 1
- Distance: 202 km (125.5 mi)
- Winning time: 4h 22' 50"

Results
| | Winner | Jasper Philipsen (BEL) | (Alpecin–Deceuninck) |
| | Second | Jordi Meeus (BEL) | (Red Bull–Bora–Hansgrohe) |
| | Third | Milan Fretin (BEL) | (Cofidis) |

The 2024 Münsterland Giro (known as the Sparkasse Münsterland Giro for sponsorship reasons) was the 18th edition of the Münsterland Giro road cycling one day race, held mostly in the titular region of northwest Germany on 3 October 2024.

== Teams ==
Ten UCI WorldTeams, nine UCI ProTeams, and four UCI Continental teams made up the 23 teams that participated in the race.

UCI WorldTeams

- Alpecin–Deceuninck
- Arkéa–B&B Hotels
- Cofidis
- Intermarché–Wanty
- Lidl–Trek
- Soudal–Quick-Step
- Red Bull–Bora–Hansgrohe
- Team dsm–firmenich PostNL
- Team Jayco–AlUla
- Visma–Lease a Bike

UCI ProTeams

- Israel–Premier Tech
- Lotto–Dstny
- Q36.5 Pro Cycling Team
- TDT–Unibet Cycling Team
- Team Flanders–Baloise
- Team Novo Nordisk
- Team TotalEnergies
- Tudor Pro Cycling Team
- Uno-X Mobility

UCI Continental Teams

- P&S Metalltechnik Benotti
- Rad-Net Oßwald
- Rembe Pro Cycling Team Sauerland
- Team Lotto–Kern Haus PSD Bank

== Result ==
Result
| Rank | Rider | Team | Time |
|---|---|---|---|
| 1 | Jasper Philipsen (BEL) | Alpecin–Deceuninck | 4h 22' 50" |
| 2 | Jordi Meeus (BEL) | Red Bull–Bora–Hansgrohe | + 0" |
| 3 | Milan Fretin (BEL) | Cofidis | + 0" |
| 4 | Biniam Girmay (ERI) | Intermarché–Wanty | + 0" |
| 5 | Max Walscheid (GER) | Team Jayco–AlUla | + 0" |
| 6 | Danny van Poppel (NED) | Red Bull–Bora–Hansgrohe | + 0" |
| 7 | Pascal Ackermann (GER) | Israel–Premier Tech | + 0" |
| 8 | Nils Eekhoff (NED) | Team dsm–firmenich PostNL | + 0" |
| 9 | Luke Lamperti (USA) | Soudal–Quick-Step | + 0" |
| 10 | Tom Van Asbroeck (BEL) | Israel–Premier Tech | + 0" |
