= Münsterland Giro =

German one-day road cycling race

Race details
- Date: October 3
- Region: Münster, Germany
- English name: Tour of Münsterland
- Local name: Münsterland Giro (in German)
- Discipline: Road
- Competition: UCI Europe Tour
- Type: Single-day

History
- First edition: 2006
- Editions: 20 (as of 2026)
- First winner: Paul Martens (GER)
- Most wins: Marcel Kittel (GER); Jos van Emden (NED); André Greipel (GER); Jasper Philipsen (BEL) (2 wins)
- Most recent: Olav Kooij (NED)

The Münsterland Giro is a cycling race annually held in Münsterland, Germany. It was first held in 2006 as a 1.2 race of the UCI Europe Tour, becoming a 1.1 race in 2007 and a 1.HC race in 2015. The race became part of the new UCI ProSeries in 2020.

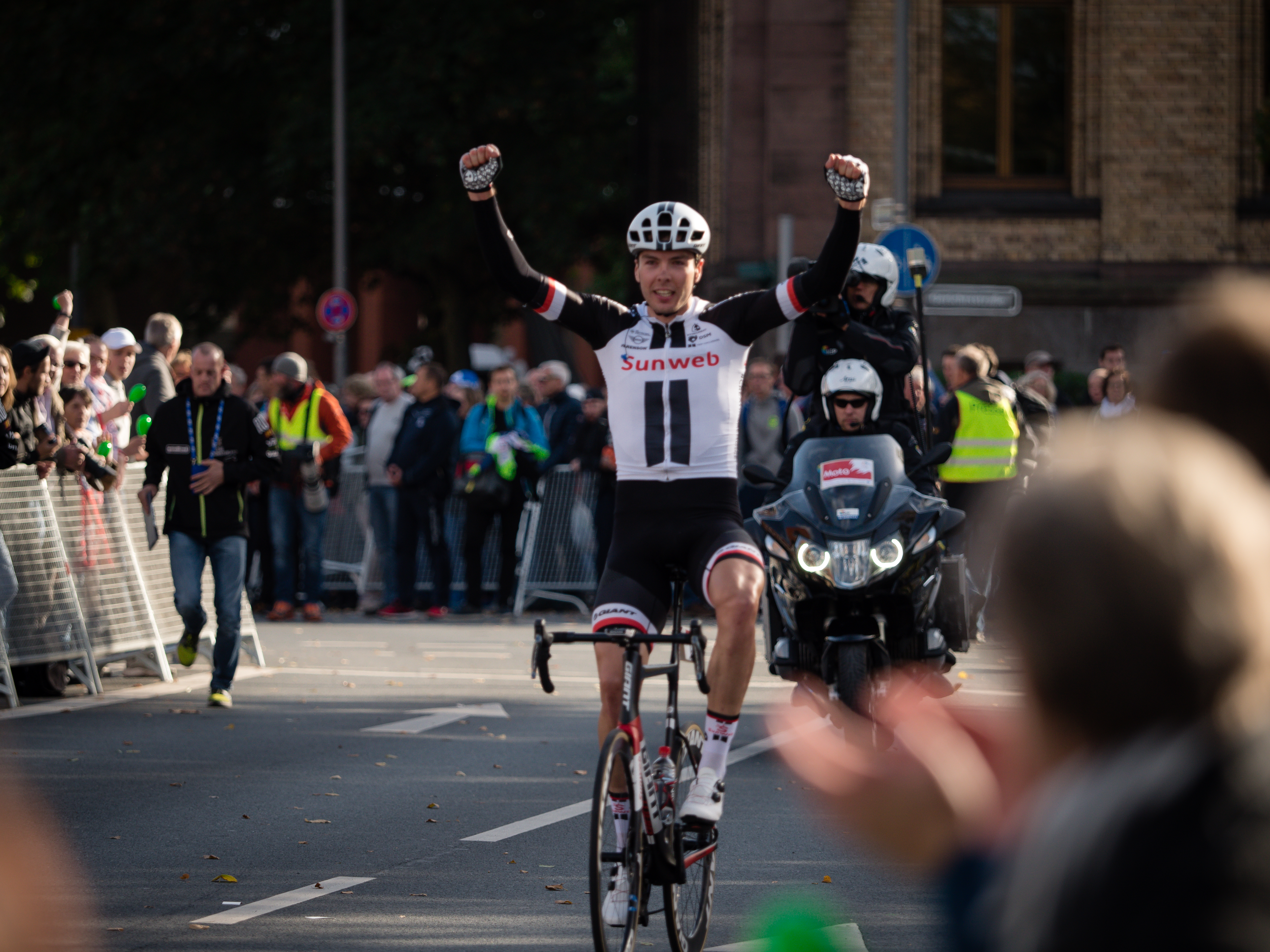
Max Walscheid winning the 2018 edition

== Winners ==
Year	Country	Rider	Team
2006	Germany	Paul Martens	Skil–Shimano
2007	Netherlands	Jos Van Emden	Rabobank Continental
2008	Germany	André Greipel	Team Columbia
2009	Latvia	Aleksejs Saramotins	Team Designa Køkken
2010	Netherlands	Joost van Leijen	Vacansoleil
2011	Germany	Marcel Kittel	Skil–Shimano
2012	Germany	Marcel Kittel	Argos–Shimano
2013	Netherlands	Jos van Emden	Belkin Pro Cycling
2014	Germany	André Greipel	Lotto–Belisol
2015	Belgium	Tom Boonen	Etixx–Quick-Step
2016	Germany	John Degenkolb	Team Giant–Alpecin
2017	Ireland	Sam Bennett	Bora–Hansgrohe
2018	Germany	Max Walscheid	Team Sunweb
2019	Colombia	Álvaro Hodeg	Deceuninck–Quick-Step
2020	No race due to COVID-19 pandemic		
2021	Great Britain	Mark Cavendish	Deceuninck–Quick-Step
2022	Netherlands	Olav Kooij	Team Jumbo–Visma
2023	Norway	Per Strand Hagenes	Team Jumbo–Visma
2024	Belgium	Jasper Philipsen	Alpecin–Deceuninck
2025	Belgium	Jasper Philipsen	Alpecin–Deceuninck
2026	Netherlands	Olav Kooij	Decathlon CMA CGM
