= Max Walscheid =

German cyclist (born 1993)

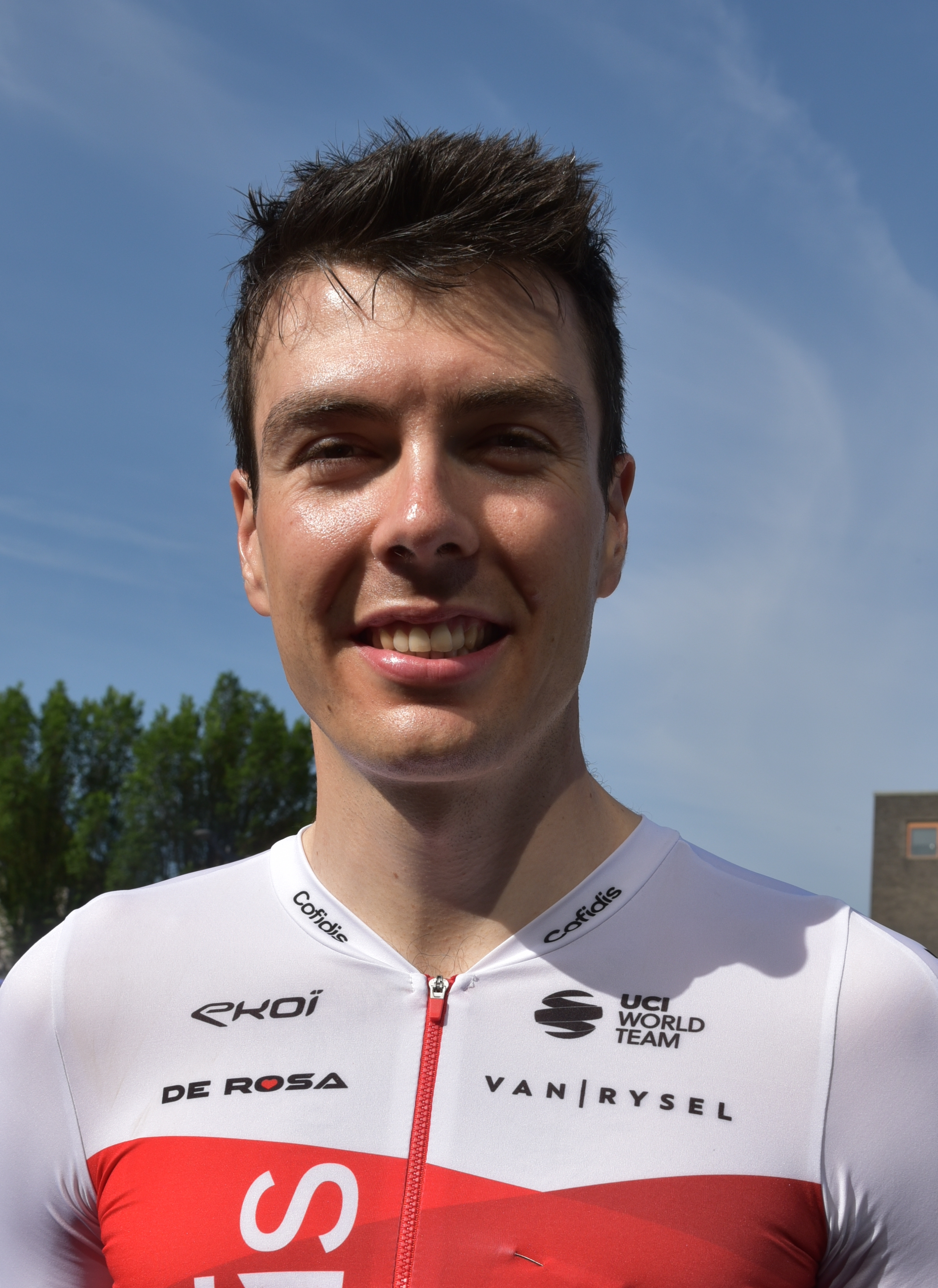
- Walscheid at the 2022 Rund um Köln.

Personal information
- Full name: Maximilian Richard Walscheid
- Nickname: Max
- Born: 13 June 1993 (age 33) Neuwied, Germany
- Height: 1.99 m (6 ft 6 in)
- Weight: 92 kg (203 lb)

Cycling career
- Sport: Cycling
- Discipline: Road
- Role: Rider
- Rider type: Sprinter; Time trialist

Amateur teams
- 2009: VC Neuwied '81
- 2010–2011: Das Rad Koblenz
- 2011: Carboo4U Radsport Team Rheinland-Pfalz/Saarland

Professional teams
- 2012–2014: Team Raiko–Stölting
- 2015: Team Kuota–Lotto
- 2015: Team Giant–Alpecin (stagiaire)
- 2016–2019: Team Giant–Alpecin
- 2020–2021: NTT Pro Cycling
- 2022–2023: Cofidis
- 2024–2025: Team Jayco–AlUla
- 2026: Lidl–Trek

Major wins
- One-day races and Classics GP de Denain (2022) Münsterland Giro (2018)
Medal record
Men's road bicycle racing
Representing Germany
World Championships
Gold medal – first place	2021 Flanders	Mixed team relay
Bronze medal – third place	2023 Glasgow	Mixed team relay
European Championships
Silver medal – second place	2021 Trentino	Mixed team relay
Silver medal – second place	2024 Limburg	Mixed team relay
Bronze medal – third place	2023 Drenthe	Mixed team relay

Maximilian Richard "Max" Walscheid (born 13 June 1993) is a German former professional cyclist who rides for UCI WorldTeam Lidl–Trek.

== Personal life ==
Walscheid is one of the hosts of the cycling podcast Radio RTW, alongside Richard Weinzheimer and Tobias Knaup. The podcast is released weekly and features stories from cycling, including topics such as training methods, equipment and developments in the WorldTour.

== Career ==
Walscheid was born in Neuwied. On 23 January 2016, he was one of the six members of Team Giant–Alpecin who were hit by a motorist who drove into on-coming traffic while they were training in Spain. All riders were in stable condition.

In August 2018, he was named in the startlist for the Vuelta a España. In August 2020, he was named in the startlist for the 2020 Tour de France.

During the 2021 Tour de France he won a wheelie contest which the YouTube channel Tour de Tietema hosted. The wheelie contest was repeated in the 2022 Tour de France during the first rest day, and he won with a distance of 1420 meters.

It was announced that Walscheid would retire at the end of the 2026 season, with his last race being the Münsterland Giro. He will stay a part of Lidl-Trek, moving into a new role alongside the Health & Performance Team.

== Major results ==
2014
1st Road race, National Under-23 Road Championships
9th Overall Tour de Berlin

1st Stages 4 & 5

2015
1st Kernen Omloop Echt-Susteren
2nd Overall Tour de Berlin

1st Stage 4

5th Zuid Oost Drenthe Classic
8th Omloop van het Houtland
10th Velothon Berlin
2016 (5 pro wins)
Tour of Hainan

1st Points classification
1st Stages 3, 4, 5, 7 & 9

2nd Road race, National Road Championships
2017 (1)
1st Stage 5 Danmark Rundt
5th Omloop van het Houtland
2018 (2)
1st Münsterland Giro
1st Stage 3 Tour de Yorkshire
3rd Road race, National Road Championships
6th Scheldeprijs
2019 (1)
1st Omloop van het Houtland
2nd Scheldeprijs
4th Time trial, National Road Championships
5th Münsterland Giro
2020 (2)
Tour de Langkawi

1st Points classification
1st Stages 3 & 8

2021
1st Team relay, UCI Road World Championships
UEC European Road Championships

2nd Team relay
5th Time trial

3rd Time trial, National Road Championships
7th Nokere Koerse
7th Bredene Koksijde Classic
2022 (1)
1st Grand Prix de Denain
2nd Nokere Koerse
3rd Münsterland Giro
4th Classic Brugge–De Panne
7th Grand Prix d'Isbergues
10th Trofeo Playa de Palma
2023
3rd Team relay, UCI Road World Championships
3rd Team relay, UEC European Road Championships
6th Overall Tour Poitou-Charentes en Nouvelle-Aquitaine
6th Clásica de Almería
6th Elfstedenronde
8th Paris–Roubaix
8th Scheldeprijs
2024 (1)
1st Omloop van het Houtland
1st Stage 1 (TTT) Okolo Slovenska
5th Time trial, National Road Championships
5th Münsterland Giro
10th Time trial, UEC European Road Championships
10th Elfstedenrace
2026 (1)
2nd Overall ZLM Tour

1st Points classification
1st Stage 3

2nd Time trial, National Road Championships
6th Copenhagen Sprint

=== Grand Tour general classification results timeline ===
Grand Tour	2018	2019	2020	2021	2022	2023	2024	2025	2026
Giro d'Italia	—	—	—	124	—	—	127	—	141
Tour de France	—	—	134	121	DNF	—	—	—	—
Vuelta a España	156	137	—	—	—	—	—	—	—

Legend
—	Did not compete
DNF	Did not finish
