= Clément Russo =

French bicycle racer

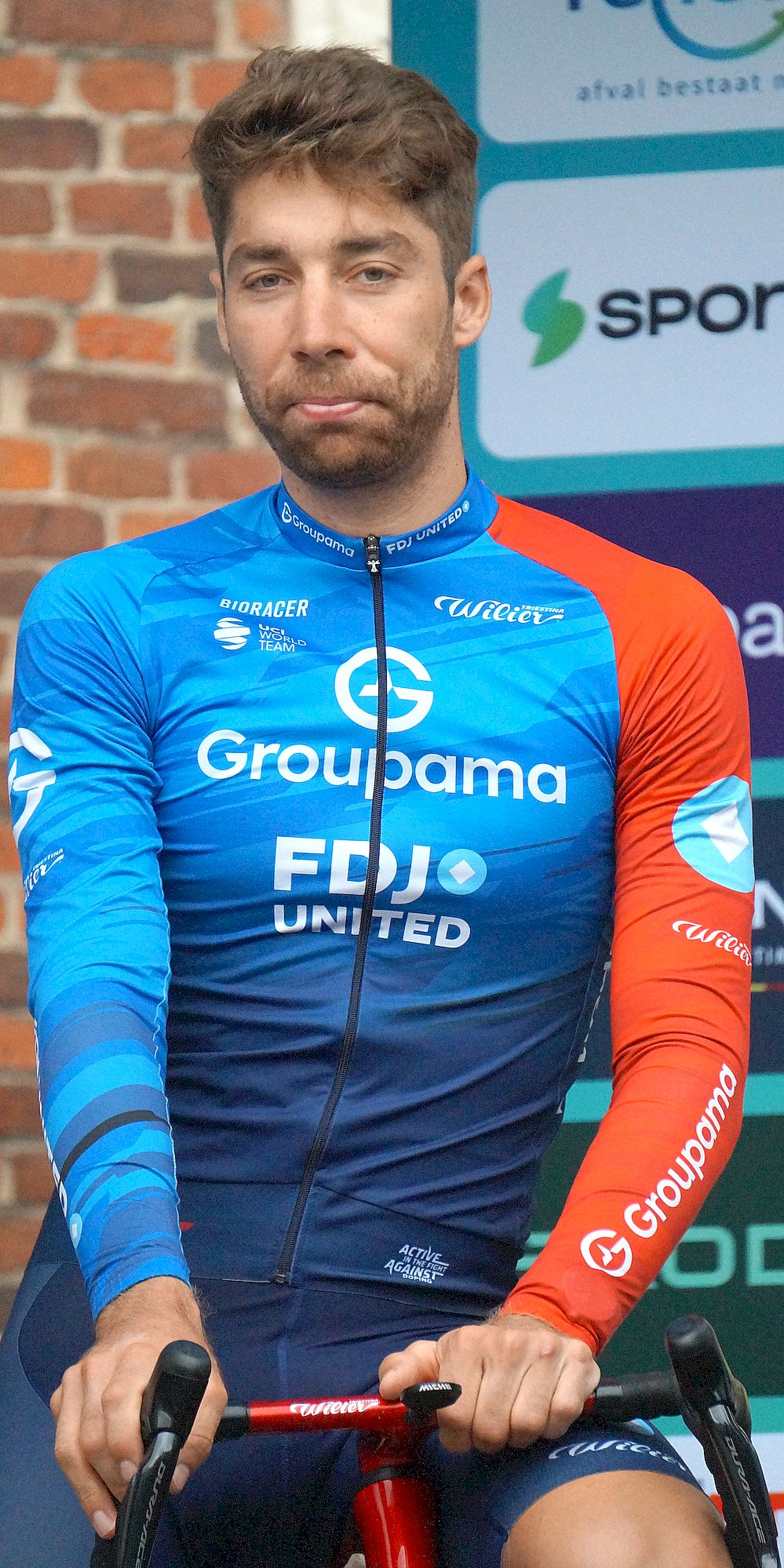
- Russo in 2026

Personal information
- Full name: Clément Russo
- Born: 20 January 1995 (age 31) Lyon, France
- Height: 1.86 m (6 ft 1 in)
- Weight: 73 kg (161 lb)

Cycling career
- Sport: Cycling
- Current team: Groupama–FDJ United
- Disciplines: Cyclo-cross; Road
- Role: Rider

Amateur teams
- 2012–2013: Charvieu-Chavagneux IC juniors
- 2014–2015: Charvieu-Chavagneux IC
- 2015–2017: Probikeshop Saint-Étienne Loire
- 2017: AG2R La Mondiale (stagiaire)

Professional teams
- 2018–2023: Fortuneo–Samsic
- 2024–: Groupama–FDJ

Clement Russo (born 20 January 1995) is a French road and former cyclo-cross cyclist, who currently rides for UCI WorldTeam Groupama–FDJ United. He competed in the men's under-23 event at the 2016 UCI Cyclo-cross World Championships in Heusden-Zolder. In August 2020, he was named in the startlist for the 2020 Tour de France.

== Major results ==
=== Road ===
2017
2nd Overall Tour de Beauce

1st Young rider classification

4th Overall Tour de Gironde
2018
9th Polynormande
2019
1st Overall Vuelta a la Comunidad de Madrid
9th Overall Tour de Bretagne
9th Tour de l'Eurométropole
9th La Roue Tourangelle
2021
5th Scheldeprijs
2022
9th Dwars door het Hageland
2024
6th Omloop van het Houtland
Combativity award Stage 5 Tour de France
2026
6th Grand Prix d'Isbergues

==== Grand Tour general classification results timeline ====
Grand Tour	2020	2021	2022	2023
Giro d'Italia	—	—	—	DNF
Tour de France	133	DNF	—	
Vuelta a España	—	—	116	

Legend
—	Did not compete
DNF	Did not finish

=== Cyclo-cross ===
2012–2013
1st National Junior Championships
Junior Coupe de France

1st Saverne
1st Besançon

2nd UEC European Junior Championships
2014–2015
2nd National Under-23 Championships
Under-23 Coupe de France

2nd Besançon
2nd Sisteron
3rd Lanarvily

2015–2016
1st National Under-23 Championships
Under-23 Coupe de France

1st Albi
1st Quelneuc

UCI Under-23 World Cup

3rd Caubergcross
3rd Hoogerheide

2016–2017
1st Overall Under-23 Coupe de France

1st Erôme Gervans
1st Bagnoles de l'Orne
1st Nommay

3rd Overall UCI Under-23 World Cup

2nd Heusden-Zolder
2nd Hoogerheide

2nd National Under-23 Championships
3rd La Mézière
2019–2020
3rd Valencia
