= Jasper Philipsen =

Belgian cyclist

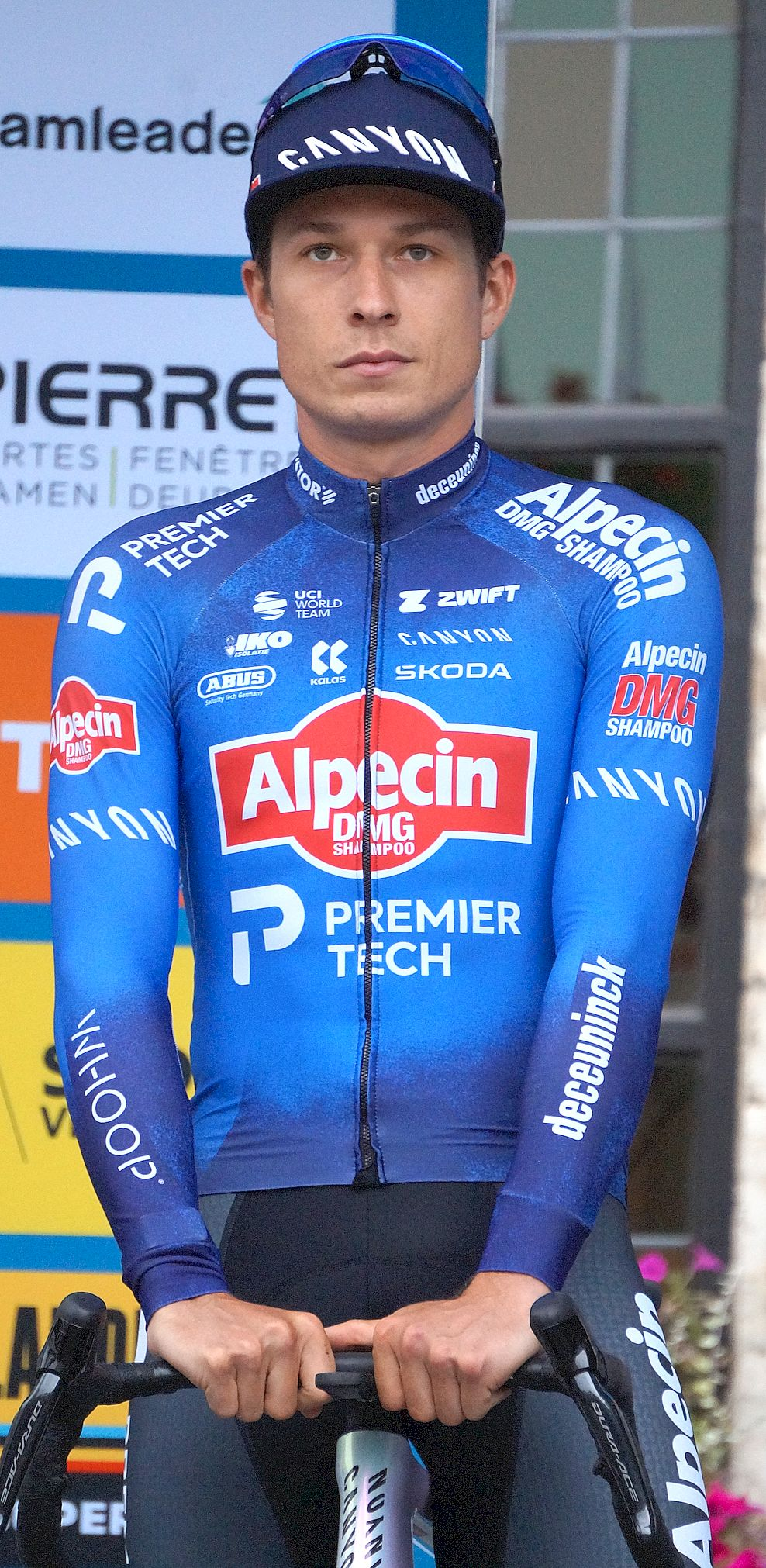
- Philipsen in 2026

Personal information
- Full name: Jasper Philipsen
- Nickname: De vlam van Ham (The flame from Ham) • Jasper Disaster • Jasper the Master
- Born: 2 March 1998 (age 28) Mol, Flanders, Belgium
- Height: 1.76 m (5 ft 9 1/2 in)
- Weight: 75 kg (165 lb; 11 st 11 lb)

Cycling career
- Sport: Cycling
- Current team: Alpecin–Premier Tech
- Discipline: Road
- Role: Sprinter

Amateur team
- 2017: BMC Development Team

Professional teams
- 2018: Hagens Berman Axeon
- 2019–2020: UAE Team Emirates
- 2021–: Alpecin–Fenix

Major wins
- Grand Tours Tour de France Points classification (2023) 11 individual stages (2022, 2023, 2024, 2025, 2026) Vuelta a España 6 individual stages (2020, 2021, 2025) Stage races Renewi Tour (2026) Tour of Belgium (2026) One-day races and Classics Milan–San Remo (2024) Gent–Wevelgem (2026) Classic Brugge–De Panne (2023, 2024) Eschborn–Frankfurt (2021) Copenhagen Sprint (2026) Scheldeprijs (2021, 2023) GP de Denain (2021) Münsterland Giro (2024, 2025) Kuurne–Brussels–Kuurne (2025) Nokere Koerse (2026)

Jasper Philipsen (born 2 March 1998) is a Belgian professional cyclist who currently rides for UCI WorldTeam Alpecin–Premier Tech. Specialising as a sprinter, he has won eleven stages in the Tour de France and six in the Vuelta a España, and the points classification in the 2023 Tour de France.

== Career ==
=== Early years ===
From 2010, Philipsen rode for the Royal Balen BC team. In 2015, he became national junior time trial champion. Later that year, he finished eighth at the European championships in the same discipline and sixth at the world championships. One year on, Philipsen won the Guido Reybrouck Classic and E3 Harelbeke for juniors, and successfully defended his national time trial title. In addition, in the same year he finished fifth in Paris-Roubaix for juniors and 11th in the Omloop der Vlaamse Gewesten. Philipsen made the cut for both the time trial and the road race at the world championships in Doha. Upon the time trial, in which he set the 18th fastest time, he was hospitalised with exhaustion and overheating. Although Philipsen appeared to have convalesced, he didn't make the road race three days later.

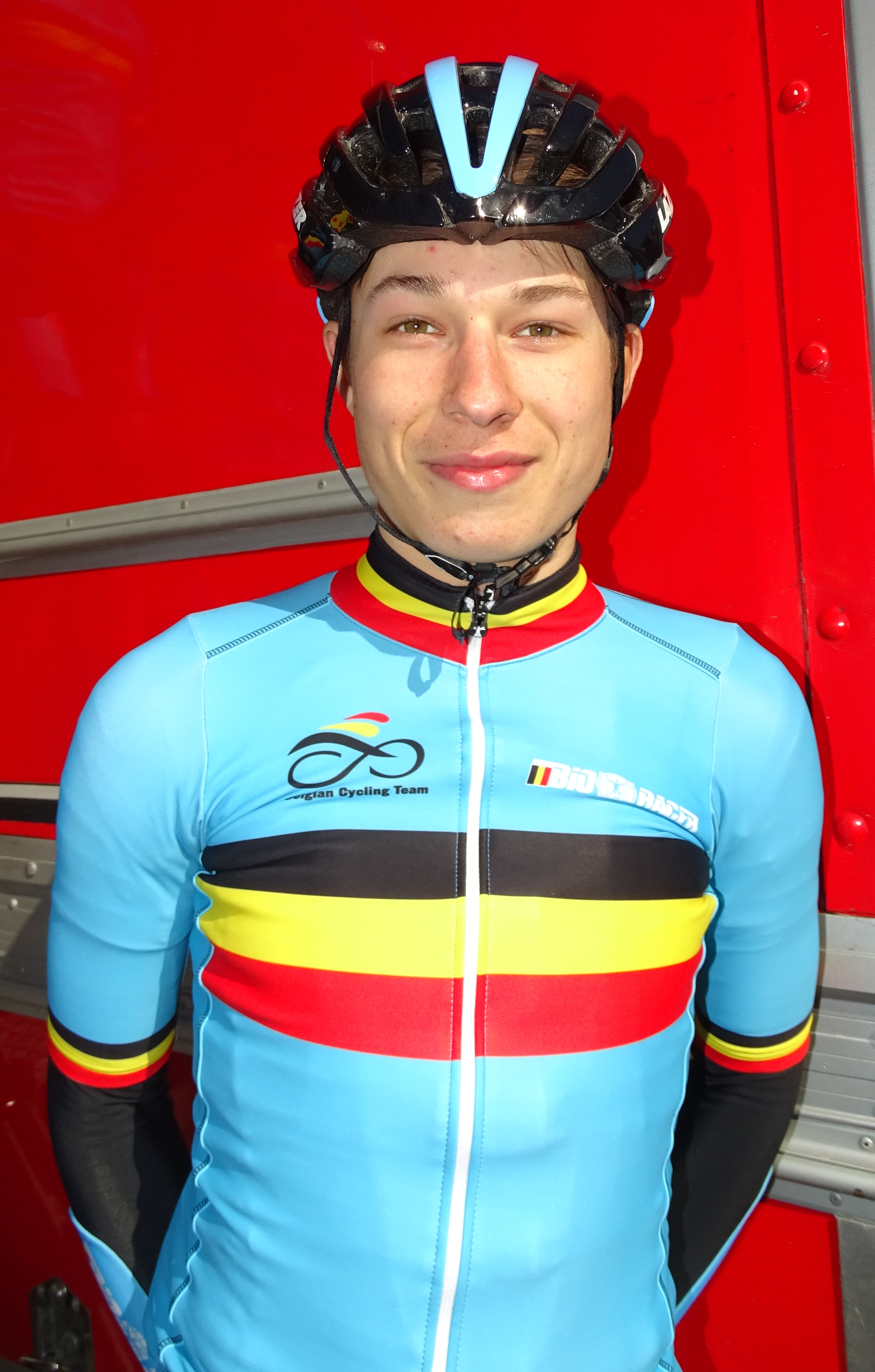
Philipsen at the 2016 Paris-Roubaix Juniors

On 1 April 2017, Philipsen secured his first UCI victory as an elite rider, for the BMC Development Team team. In the second stage of the Triptyque des Monts et Châteaux, he beat fellow-Belgian Milan Menten and Dutchman Maarten van Trijp in the bunch sprint. The day after, courtesy to a fifth place in the individual time trial, he snatched the leader's jersey from Chris Lawless. In the final stage, he finished fourth, taking not only the overall classification, but also the points ranking and youth classification. After finishing second in both the Tour of Flanders U23 and the ZLM Tour, he won a stage in the Baby Giro in June. In the points ranking, he kept one point ahead of Neilson Powless. In July, he won the second stage in the Tour of Alsace, after which he rode the hopefuls road races at both the European and national level. In the fifth stage of the Olympia's Tour, he beat Patrick van der Duin and Fabio Jakobsen in the bunch sprint. In October, he won Paris–Tours Espoirs.

=== Professional career ===
In 2018, Philipsen became professional at Hagens Berman Axeon. He took several victories that year, including the overall classification of the Triptyque des Monts et Châteaux and a stage in the Baby Giro. In October, he was offered a contract with UAE Team Emirates. Through this team, he made the switch to the World Tour.

Philipsen made the startlist for the 2019 Tour de France. He participated in the 2020 Vuelta a España, where he won stage 15. He participated in his second Tour de France in 2021 and while he did not win any stages he had many promising results including making the stage podium a half dozen times. He rode in the 2021 Vuelta a España where he won two stages. He also wore the points ranking jersey in several stages, vying with Fabio Jakobsen for the jersey, before abandoned halfway through due to a mild fever.

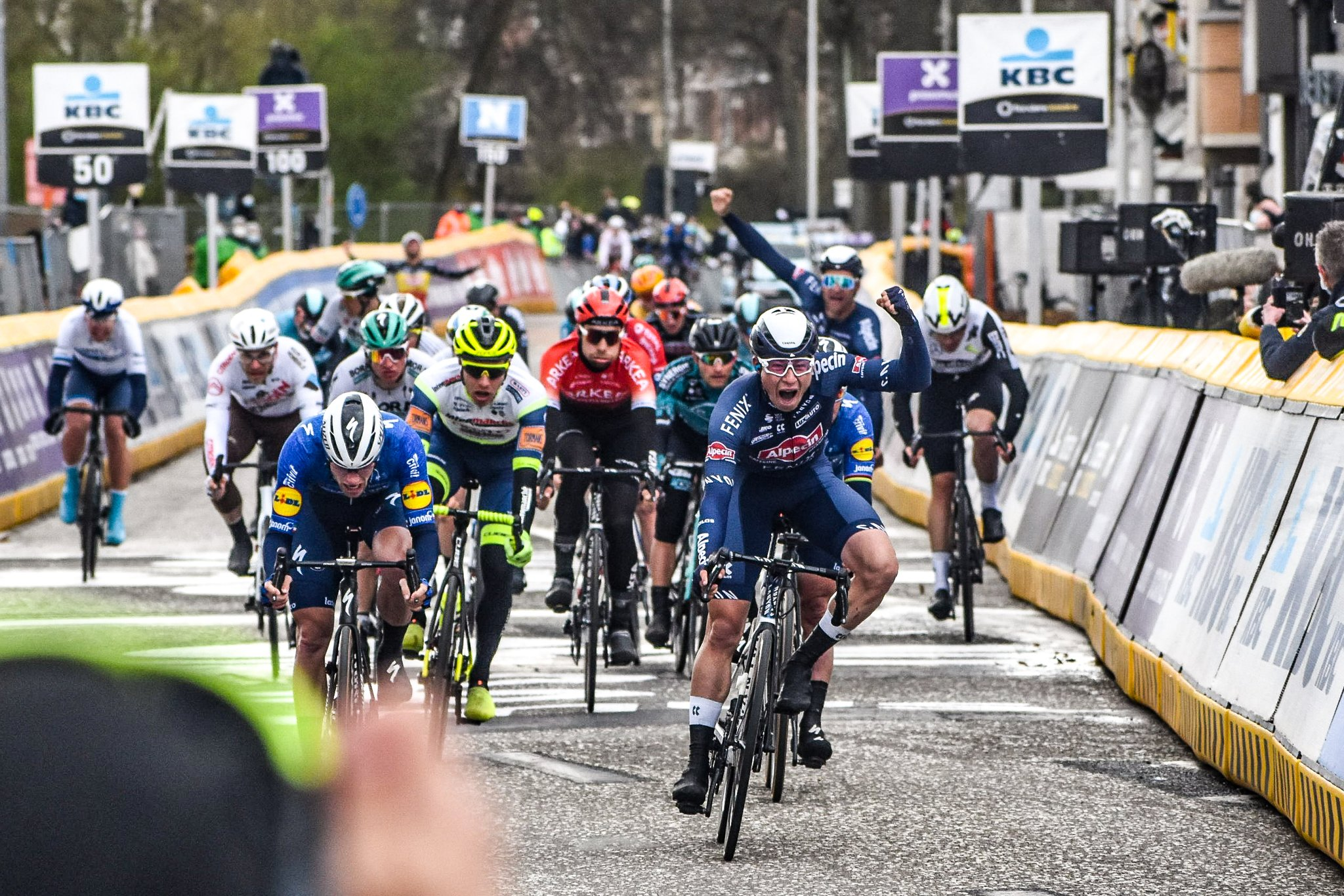
Philipsen winning 2021 Scheldeprijs

Early in the 2022 season he won the points ranking and two stages of the UAE Tour. He then won the points ranking and a stage in the Tour of Turkey and a stage in the Tour of Belgium.

He entered the 2022 Tour de France with the team pursuing stage wins for both Philipsen and Mathieu van der Poel. Philipsen initially thought he had won stage 4, but Wout Van Aert turned out to have taken the peloton by surprise, attacking as the yellow jersey. After the Alps he got a chance to win stage 15 after the final breakaway rider had been run down during the final kilometre. He managed to outpace previous stage winners Van Aert and Mads Pedersen, taking the team's first win of the race. His second stage win came on the final day in Paris, winning the sprint by a convincing margin.

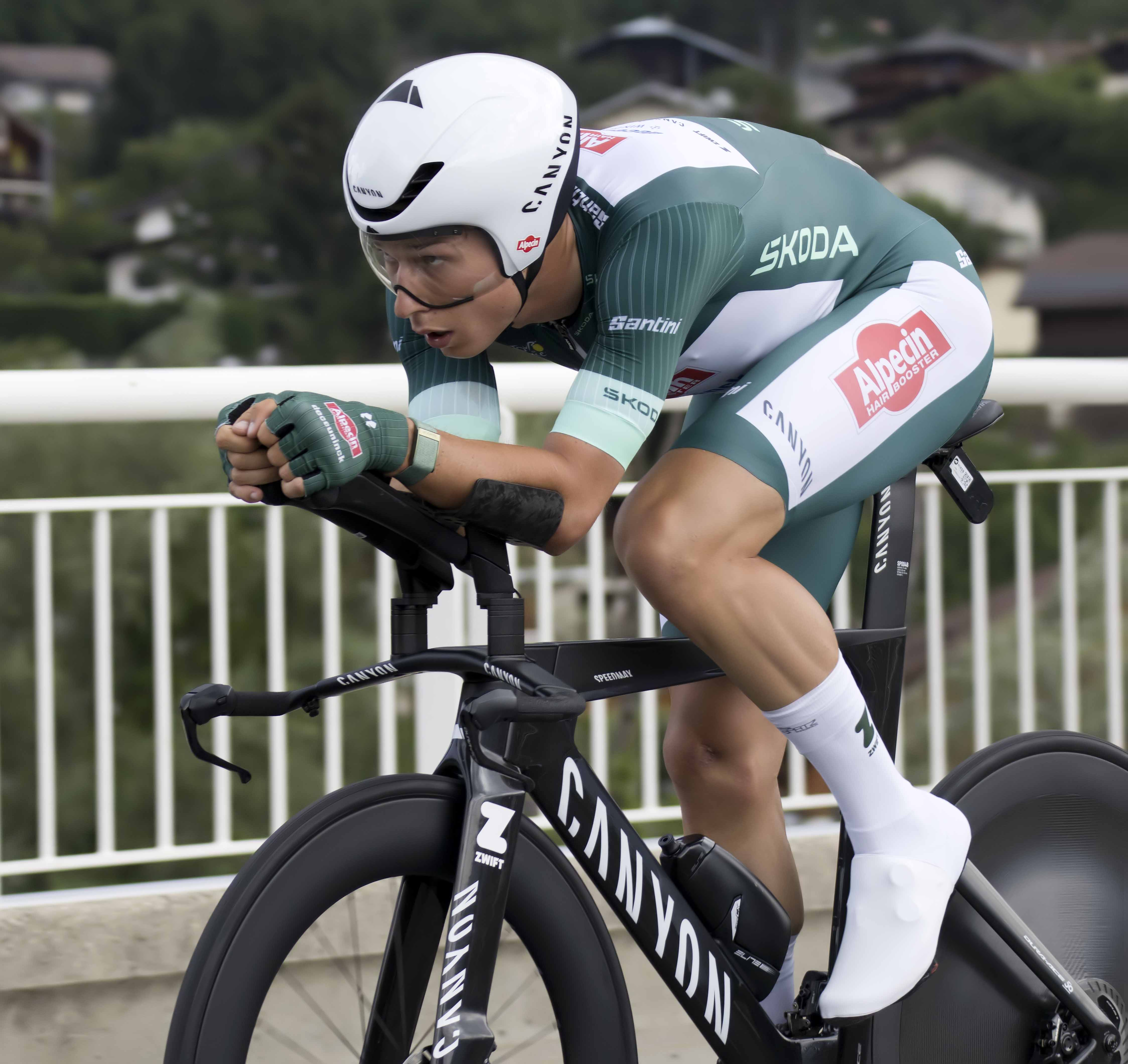
Philipsen wearing the green jersey at the 2023 Tour de France

In March 2023, he won his second World Tour one-day race: the Classic Brugge–De Panne, outsprinting Olav Kooij and Yves Lampaert only a week after winning two stages of Tirreno–Adriatico. Two weeks later, he won Scheldeprijs for the second time. Five days later, he outkicked Wout Van Aert to take second at Paris–Roubaix. This was his first podium in a Monument. At the Tour de France, he won stages 3, 4, 7 and 11, all of which were sprint finishes. This led him to ultimately win the points classification by over 100 points to second placed Mads Pedersen. Philipsen went on to win nine more races in the season, leading to a total of 19 victories.

Philipsen began his 2024 season in a similar fashion, winning one stage and finishing second in another at Tirreno–Adriatico. He then won his first Monument: Milan–San Remo in a sprint finish, ahead of Michael Matthews and Tadej Pogačar. Four days later, he defended his title at the Classic Brugge–De Panne, and again had a repeat of last year at Paris–Roubaix, where he again placed second to teammate Mathieu van der Poel. After three second-place finishes in a row on sprint stages, Philipsen won stage 10 of the 2024 Tour de France, his first of the Tour. He went on to also win stages 13 and 16.

Philipsen began 2025 by racing the UAE Tour, finishing in second on the first stage and third on another. He finished third in Omloop Het Nieuwsblad behind Søren Wærenskjold and Paul Magnier before securing his first victory of the season at the Kuurne–Brussels–Kuurne ahead of Olav Kooij, winning the race on his 27th birthday.

Philipsen won the opening stage of the 2025 Tour de France, meaning that he also got to wear the yellow jersey for the first time. During the intermediate sprint on stage 3, Philipsen was involved in a high speed crash, as a result of Bryan Coquard colliding with him, which forced him to abandon the race. It was later revealed that he suffered a displaced collarbone fracture which would require surgery and broken ribs. Philipsen underwent successful surgery at AZ Herentals in Belgium, the same night of the crash.

== Riding style ==
Sports journalists occasionally compare Jasper Philipsen to Tom Boonen, as both hail from the same region in Flanders and are routinely qualified as sprinters, specialising in classics.

"Philipsen is not only fast, he also always seems to position himself very well during bunch sprints. We are talking about making good decisions in a split second, while racing at more than 70 km per hour. This also proves he's still in a top condition at those moments. One makes easier mistakes when exhausted."

— Eddy Planckaert on Philipsen in 2023

Philipsen is one of the most prolific cyclists of his generation. By 2022, several international specialized media considered him to be the best active sprinter in the world.

He drew some criticism for his riding style during the 2023 Tour de France, as he appeared to interfere with other riders on several stages. This criticism reemerged during the 2024 Tour, as he was relegated to the back of the peloton for interfering with Wout van Aert in a bunch sprint; costing him green jersey points as he had originally finished second. During his first race of his 2025 season, he was relegated for deviating from his line yet again, this time during a second-place finish in the UAE Tour.

== Major results ==
2015
1st Time trial, National Junior Road Championships
2nd Omloop der Vlaamse Gewesten
3rd Guido Reybrouck Classic
4th La Philippe Gilbert Juniors
4th Paris–Roubaix Juniors
5th Overall Trophée Centre Morbihan
2016
1st Time trial, National Junior Road Championships
1st E3 Harelbeke Juniors
1st Guido Reybrouck Classic
3rd Kuurne–Brussels–Kuurne Juniors
5th Paris–Roubaix Juniors
10th Overall Grand Prix Rüebliland
2017
1st Overall Le Triptyque des Monts et Châteaux

1st Points classification
1st Young rider classification
1st Stage 2

1st Paris–Tours Espoirs
Giro Ciclistico d'Italia

1st Points classification
1st Stage 4

1st Stage 2 Tour Alsace
1st Stage 5 Olympia's Tour
2nd Ronde van Vlaanderen Beloften
2nd ZLM Tour
4th Berner Rundfahrt
2018 (1 pro win)
1st Overall Le Triptyque des Monts et Châteaux

1st Points classification
1st Stages 1 & 2

1st Gylne Gutuer
1st Stage 4 Tour of Utah
1st Stage 3 Giro Ciclistico d'Italia
3rd Three Days of Bruges–De Panne
4th Tour de l'Eurométropole
4th Paris–Roubaix Espoirs
5th Dorpenomloop Rucphen
6th Grote Prijs Jef Scherens
7th Grand Prix d'Isbergues
8th Primus Classic
9th Lillehammer GP
2019 (1)
1st Stage 5 Tour Down Under
2nd Grand Prix de Fourmies
2nd Heistse Pijl
3rd Nokere Koerse
3rd Elfstedenronde
3rd Brussels Cycling Classic
5th Dwars door het Hageland
6th Overall Tour of Belgium
9th Scheldeprijs
2020 (3)
1st Stage 15 Vuelta a España
1st Stage 1 BinckBank Tour
1st Stage 3 Tour du Limousin
1st Sprints classification, Tour Down Under
5th Scheldeprijs
5th Brussels Cycling Classic
9th Druivenkoers Overijse
2021 (9)
1st Kampioenschap van Vlaanderen
1st Eschborn–Frankfurt
1st Scheldeprijs
1st Grand Prix de Denain
1st Paris–Chauny
Vuelta a España

1st Stages 2 & 5
Held after Stages 2–3, 5–7

Tour of Turkey

1st Points classification
1st Stages 6 & 7

2nd Classic Brugge–De Panne
2022 (9)
1st Omloop van het Houtland
1st Paris–Bourges
Tour de France

1st Stages 15 & 21

UAE Tour

1st Points classification
1st Stages 1 & 5

Tour of Turkey

1st Points classification
1st Stage 3

1st Stage 4 Danmark Rundt
2nd Münsterland Giro
2nd Gooikse Pijl
3rd Road race, National Road Championships
4th Druivenkoers Overijse
6th Hamburg Cyclassics
6th Rund um Köln
6th Grand Prix de Wallonie
8th Overall Tour of Belgium

1st Stage 2

8th Scheldeprijs
2023 (19)
1st Kampioenschap van Vlaanderen
1st Classic Brugge–De Panne
1st Scheldeprijs
1st Elfstedenronde
1st Gooikse Pijl
1st Paris–Chauny
1st Visit Friesland Elfsteden Race
Tour de France

1st Points classification
1st Stages 3, 4, 7 & 11

Tour of Turkey

1st Points classification
1st Stages 1, 2, 4 & 8

Tirreno–Adriatico

1st Stages 3 & 7

1st Stage 1 Renewi Tour
1st Stage 1 Tour of Belgium
2nd Paris–Roubaix
4th Dwars door Vlaanderen
2024 (9)
1st Milan–San Remo
1st Classic Brugge–De Panne
1st Münsterland Giro
Tour de France

1st Stages 10, 13 & 16

1st Stage 2 Tirreno–Adriatico
2nd Road race, National Road Championships
2nd Paris–Roubaix
2nd Scheldeprijs
3rd Paris–Tours
3rd Nokere Koerse
3rd Kampioenschap van Vlaanderen
4th Road race, UEC European Road Championships
4th Overall Tour of Belgium

1st Points classification
1st Stage 3

4th Gent–Wevelgem
4th Binche–Chimay–Binche
6th Overall Renewi Tour

1st Points classification
1st Stage 4

7th Hamburg Cyclassics
2025 (7)
1st Kuurne–Brussels–Kuurne
1st Münsterland Giro
Tour de France

1st Stage 1
Held after Stage 1
Held after Stages 1–2

Vuelta a España

1st Stages 1, 8 & 19
Held after Stage 1
Held after Stages 1–2

2nd Scheldeprijs
2nd Elfstedenronde
3rd Road race, National Road Championships
3rd Omloop Het Nieuwsblad
4th Hamburg Cyclassics
8th Overall Tour of Belgium

1st Stage 2

9th Dwars door het Hageland
2026 (10)
1st Overall Renewi Tour

1st Points classification
1st Stages 2, 4 & 5

1st Overall Tour of Belgium

1st Points classification
1st Stage 5

1st Gent–Wevelgem
1st Copenhagen Sprint
1st Nokere Koerse
1st Stage 17 Tour de France
2nd Tour of Bruges
5th Kampioenschap van Vlaanderen
8th Dwars door Vlaanderen
8th Scheldeprijs
8th Münsterland Giro

=== Grand Tour general classification results timeline ===
Grand Tour	2019	2020	2021	2022	2023	2024	2025	2026
Giro d'Italia	—	—	—	—	—	—	—	—
Tour de France	DNF	—	109	91	97	128	DNF	135
Vuelta a España	—	85	DNF	—	—	—	—	—

=== Classics results timeline ===
Monument	2018	2019	2020	2021	2022	2023	2024	2025	2026
Milan–San Remo	—	150	—	—	66	15	1	163	69
Tour of Flanders	—	DNF	—	—	DNF	—	—	—	—
Paris–Roubaix	—	DNF	NH	41	—	2	2	11	
Liège–Bastogne–Liège	Has not contested during his career								
Giro di Lombardia	Has not contested during his career								
Classic	2018	2019	2020	2021	2022	2023	2024	2025	2026
Omloop Het Nieuwsblad	—	37	—	124	—	33	66	3	DNF
Kuurne–Brussels–Kuurne	—	24	122	—	—	DNF	92	1	18
Tour of Bruges	3	—	—	2	—	1	1	47	2
Gent–Wevelgem	—	—	47	38	21	DNF	4	44	1
Dwars door Vlaanderen	—	142	NH	57	29	4	15	DNF	8
Scheldeprijs	—	9	5	1	8	1	2	2	8
Eschborn–Frankfurt	—	—	NH	1	11	DNF	—	—	—
Copenhagen Sprint	Race did not exist							—	1
Hamburg Cyclassics	—	34	NH	—	6	—	7	4	
Paris–Tours	—	—	—	12	DNF	—	3	—	

Legend
—	Did not compete
DNF	Did not finish

=== Honours and awards ===
- CyclingNews: Best Sprinter in the World: 2021, 2022, 2023
- Most Victories in 1 Season: 19 in 2023
- Flandrien of the Year – Best Professional Cyclist: 2023
