= Juan Sebastián Molano =

Colombian road racing cyclist (born 1994)

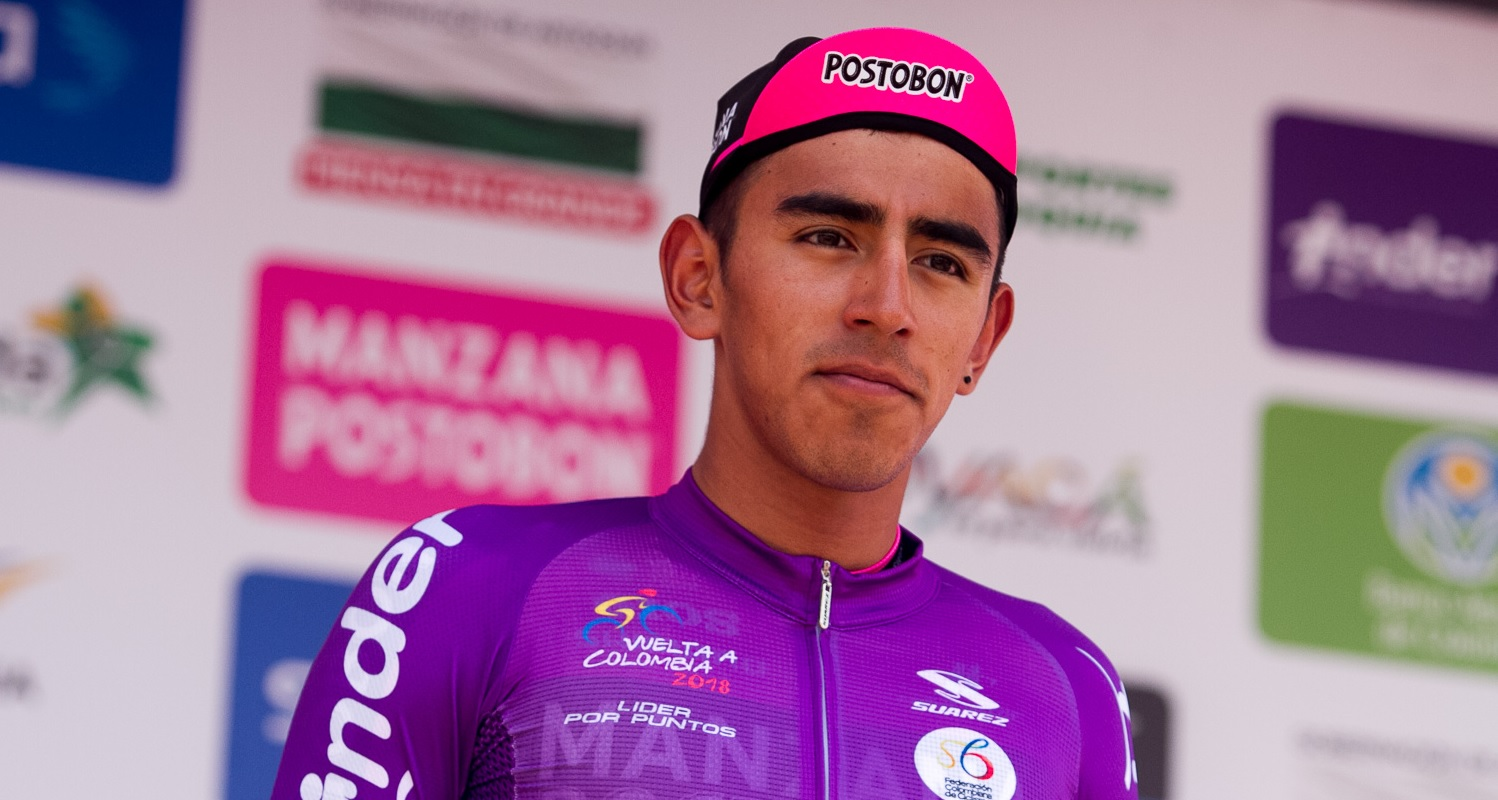
- Molano in 2018

Personal information
- Full name: Juan Sebastián Molano Benavides
- Born: 11 April 1994 (age 32) Paipa, Colombia
- Height: 1.80 m (5 ft 11 in)
- Weight: 72 kg (159 lb; 11 st 5 lb)

Cycling career
- Sport: Cycling
- Current team: UAE Team Emirates XRG
- Disciplines: Road; Track
- Role: Rider
- Rider type: Sprinter

Amateur teams
- 2011–2012: Proyectos Alcaldía Paipa
- 2013: Fuerzas Armadas–Ejército Nacional
- 2014: Coldeportes–Claro

Professional teams
- 2015: Colombia
- 2016–2018: Team Manzana Postobón
- 2019–: UAE Team Emirates

Major wins
- Grand Tours Vuelta a España 2 individual stages (2022, 2023) One-day races and Classics Classic Brugge–De Panne (2025) GP de Denain (2023)
Medal record
Men's road cycling
Representing Colombia
Pan American Championships
Gold medal – first place	2018 San Juan	Road race
Bronze medal – third place	2017 Santo Domingo	Road race

Juan Sebastián Molano Benavides (born 11 April 1994) is a Colombian professional racing cyclist, who currently rides for UCI WorldTeam UAE Team Emirates XRG.

== Career ==
Molano was named in the startlist for the 2017 Vuelta a España.

He started riding in the 2019 Giro d'Italia, but he was suspended by his team following stage 3 after "seemingly unusual physiological results". The team refrained from commenting further until more tests were carried out. Molano did not start stage 4. Molano was later cleared to resume racing at the Adriatica Ionica Race in late-July 2019 after further tests found he was "highly sensitive to altitude changes."

In June 2022, Molano was disqualified from the Critérium du Dauphiné after he punched Hugo Page in the head. In September of the same year, he won the final stage of the 2022 Vuelta a España ahead of his team-mate Pascal Ackermann, despite the expectation that Ackermann would be the final man in the team's lead-out train.

Molano competed in the 2023 Vuelta a España. He took a win on Stage 12 of the race, finishing ahead of Kaden Groves.

== Major results ==
2014
Pan American Track Championships

1st Omnium
1st Team pursuit

2016 (1 pro win)
1st Stage 1 Vuelta a la Comunidad de Madrid
1st Stage 4 Vuelta a Colombia
2017 (2)
Volta ao Alentejo

1st Stages 3 & 5

3rd Road race, Pan American Road Championships
3rd Grand Prix de Denain
2018 (6)
1st Road race, Pan American Road Championships
1st Overall Tour of China I

1st Points classification
1st Stage 2

Tour of Xingtai

1st Stages 2 & 3

1st Stage 2 Tour of China II
10th Overall Tour of Taihu Lake

1st Points classification
1st Stages 1 & 2

2019 (1)
1st Stage 3 Tour Colombia
2020 (3)
Tour Colombia

1st Points classification
1st Stages 2, 3 & 5

2021 (4)
Vuelta a Burgos

1st Points classification
1st Stages 2 & 4

Giro di Sicilia

1st Points classification
1st Stages 1 & 2

7th Coppa Bernocchi
2022 (2)
1st Stage 21 Vuelta a España
1st Stage 4 Boucles de la Mayenne
2nd Trofeo Playa de Palma
5th Clásica de Almería
2023 (5)
1st Grand Prix de Denain
1st Stage 12 Vuelta a España
1st Stage 4 UAE Tour
1st Stage 5 Tour of Guangxi
1st Stage 1 Vuelta a Burgos
5th Trofeo Palma
7th Bredene Koksijde Classic
9th Classic Brugge–De Panne
10th Clásica de Almería
2024 (1)
1st Stage 2 CRO Race
6th Brussels Cycling Classic
7th Classic Brugge–De Panne
2025 (2)
1st Classic Brugge–De Panne
1st Stage 5 Tour de Hongrie
1st Points classification, Tour of Belgium
2026 (2)
1st Stage 1 CRO Race
1st Stage 1 Tour of Oman
3rd Nokere Koerse

=== Grand Tour general classification results timeline ===
Grand Tour	2017	2018	2019	2020	2021	2022	2023	2024
Giro d'Italia	—	—	DNF	DNF	126	—	—	125
Tour de France	—	—	—	—	—	—	—	—
Vuelta a España	152	—	143	—	DNF	126	147	—

Legend
—	Did not compete
DNF	Did not finish
