= List of teams and cyclists in the 2020 Tour de France =

List of cyclists

The following is a list of teams and cyclists that took part in the 2020 Tour de France. Each of the 22 teams started with eight riders, for a total of 176 participants.

== Teams ==
The 19 UCI WorldTeams were automatically invited to the race. Additionally, the organisers of the Tour, the Amaury Sport Organisation (ASO), invited three second-tier UCI ProTeams to participate in the event. Two of the three French teams have participated in the race before, while B&B Hotels–Vital Concept made their Tour de France debut.

The teams that participated in the race were:

UCI WorldTeams

- AG2R La Mondiale
- Astana
- Bahrain–McLaren
- Bora–Hansgrohe
- CCC Team
- Cofidis
- Deceuninck–Quick-Step
- EF Pro Cycling
- Groupama–FDJ
- Ineos Grenadiers
- Israel Start-Up Nation
- Lotto–Soudal
- Mitchelton–Scott
- Movistar Team
- NTT Pro Cycling
- Team Jumbo–Visma
- Team Sunweb
- Trek–Segafredo
- UAE Team Emirates

UCI ProTeams

- Arkéa–Samsic
- B&B Hotels–Vital Concept
- Total Direct Énergie

== Cyclists ==
Legend
| No. | Starting number worn by the rider during the Tour |
| Pos. | Position in the general classification |
| Time | Deficit to the winner of the general classification |
| ‡ | Denotes riders born on or after 1 January 1995 eligible for the young rider classification |
| General classification | Denotes the winner of the general classification |
| Points classification | Denotes the winner of the points classification |
| Mountains classification | Denotes the winner of the mountains classification |
| Young rider classification | Denotes the winner of the young rider classification (eligibility indicated by ‡) |
| Team classification | Denotes riders that represent the winner of the team classification |
| Super-combativity award | Denotes the winner of the super-combativity award |
| DNS | Denotes a rider who did not start a stage, followed by the stage before which he withdrew |
| DNF | Denotes a rider who did not finish a stage, followed by the stage in which he withdrew |
| DSQ | Denotes a rider who was disqualified from the race, followed by the stage in which this occurred |
| HD | Denotes a rider finished outside the time limit, followed by the stage in which they did so |
| COV | Denotes a rider who withdrawn because of COVID-19 either because he tested positive or two members of team tested positive, followed by the stage before which he withdrew |
Ages correct as of Saturday 29 August 2020, the date on which the Tour began

=== By starting number ===
| No. | Name | Nationality | Team | Age | Pos. | Time | Ref. |
|---|---|---|---|---|---|---|---|
| 1 | Egan Bernal ‡ | Colombia | Ineos Grenadiers | 23 | DNS-17 | – | |
| 2 | Andrey Amador | Costa Rica | Ineos Grenadiers | 34 | 77 | + 3h 49' 04" | |
| 3 | Richard Carapaz | Ecuador | Ineos Grenadiers | 27 | 13 | + 25' 53" | |
| 4 | Jonathan Castroviejo | Spain | Ineos Grenadiers | 33 | DNS-19 | – | |
| 5 | Michał Kwiatkowski | Poland | Ineos Grenadiers | 30 | 30 | + 2h 06' 32" | |
| 6 | Luke Rowe | Great Britain | Ineos Grenadiers | 30 | 129 | + 5h 17' 50" | |
| 7 | Pavel Sivakov ‡ | Russia | Ineos Grenadiers | 23 | 87 | + 4h 15' 38" | |
| 8 | Dylan van Baarle | Netherlands | Ineos Grenadiers | 28 | 59 | + 3h 07' 42" | |
| 11 | Primož Roglič | Slovenia | Team Jumbo–Visma | 30 | 2 | + 59" | |
| 12 | George Bennett | New Zealand | Team Jumbo–Visma | 30 | 34 | + 2h 15' 49" | |
| 13 | Amund Grøndahl Jansen | Norway | Team Jumbo–Visma | 26 | 128 | + 5h 17' 28" | |
| 14 | Tom Dumoulin | Netherlands | Team Jumbo–Visma | 29 | 7 | + 7' 48" | |
| 15 | Robert Gesink | Netherlands | Team Jumbo–Visma | 34 | 42 | + 2h 30' 35" | |
| 16 | Sepp Kuss | United States | Team Jumbo–Visma | 25 | 15 | + 42' 20" | |
| 17 | Tony Martin | Germany | Team Jumbo–Visma | 35 | 118 | + 5h 05' 28" | |
| 18 | Wout Van Aert | Belgium | Team Jumbo–Visma | 25 | 20 | + 1h 20' 31" | |
| 21 | Peter Sagan | Slovakia | Bora–Hansgrohe | 30 | 84 | + 4h 04' 15" | |
| 22 | Emanuel Buchmann | Germany | Bora–Hansgrohe | 27 | 38 | + 2h 21' 57" | |
| 23 | Felix Großschartner | Austria | Bora–Hansgrohe | 26 | 63 | + 3h 25' 17" | |
| 24 | Lennard Kämna ‡ | Germany | Bora–Hansgrohe | 23 | 33 | + 2h 15' 39" | |
| 25 | Gregor Mühlberger | Austria | Bora–Hansgrohe | 26 | DNF-11 | – | |
| 26 | Daniel Oss | Italy | Bora–Hansgrohe | 33 | 105 | + 4h 40' 46" | |
| 27 | Lukas Pöstlberger | Austria | Bora–Hansgrohe | 28 | DNF-19 | – | |
| 28 | Maximilian Schachmann | Germany | Bora–Hansgrohe | 26 | 57 | + 3h 03' 28" | |
| 31 | Romain Bardet | France | AG2R La Mondiale | 29 | DNS-14 | – | |
| 32 | Mikaël Cherel | France | AG2R La Mondiale | 34 | 26 | + 1h 40' 51" | |
| 33 | Benoît Cosnefroy ‡ | France | AG2R La Mondiale | 24 | 116 | + 5h 00' 43" | |
| 34 | Pierre Latour | France | AG2R La Mondiale | 26 | DNF-14 | – | |
| 35 | Oliver Naesen | Belgium | AG2R La Mondiale | 29 | 61 | + 3h 22' 04" | |
| 36 | Nans Peters | France | AG2R La Mondiale | 26 | 65 | + 3h 27' 46" | |
| 37 | Clément Venturini | France | AG2R La Mondiale | 26 | 104 | + 4h 39' 08" | |
| 38 | Alexis Vuillermoz | France | AG2R La Mondiale | 32 | 35 | + 2h 16' 19" | |
| 41 | Julian Alaphilippe | France | Deceuninck–Quick-Step | 28 | 36 | + 2h 19' 11" | |
| 42 | Kasper Asgreen ‡ | Denmark | Deceuninck–Quick-Step | 25 | 114 | + 5h 00' 04" | |
| 43 | Sam Bennett | Ireland | Deceuninck–Quick-Step | 29 | 138 | + 5h 32' 33" | |
| 44 | Rémi Cavagna ‡ | France | Deceuninck–Quick-Step | 25 | 113 | + 4h 58' 46" | |
| 45 | Tim Declercq | Belgium | Deceuninck–Quick-Step | 31 | 127 | + 5h 14' 52" | |
| 46 | Dries Devenyns | Belgium | Deceuninck–Quick-Step | 37 | 90 | + 4h 20' 41" | |
| 47 | Bob Jungels | Luxembourg | Deceuninck–Quick-Step | 27 | 43 | + 2h 33' 30" | |
| 48 | Michael Mørkøv | Denmark | Deceuninck–Quick-Step | 35 | 130 | + 5h 26' 21" | |
| 51 | Thibaut Pinot | France | Groupama–FDJ | 30 | 29 | + 1h 59' 54" | |
| 52 | William Bonnet | France | Groupama–FDJ | 38 | DNF-8 | – | |
| 53 | David Gaudu ‡ | France | Groupama–FDJ | 23 | DNF-16 | – | |
| 54 | Stefan Küng | Switzerland | Groupama–FDJ | 26 | DNS-17 | – | |
| 55 | Mathieu Ladagnous | France | Groupama–FDJ | 35 | 94 | + 4h 24' 52" | |
| 56 | Valentin Madouas ‡ | France | Groupama–FDJ | 24 | 27 | + 1h 42' 43" | |
| 57 | Rudy Molard | France | Groupama–FDJ | 30 | 39 | + 2h 26' 53" | |
| 58 | Sébastien Reichenbach | Switzerland | Groupama–FDJ | 31 | 24 | + 1h 39' 27" | |
| 61 | Mikel Landa | Spain | Bahrain–McLaren | 30 | 4 | + 5' 58" | |
| 62 | Pello Bilbao | Spain | Bahrain–McLaren | 30 | 16 | + 55' 56" | |
| 63 | Damiano Caruso | Italy | Bahrain–McLaren | 32 | 10 | + 14' 03" | |
| 64 | Sonny Colbrelli | Italy | Bahrain–McLaren | 30 | 93 | + 4h 24' 42" | |
| 65 | Marco Haller | Austria | Bahrain–McLaren | 29 | 143 | + 5h 46' 27" | |
| 66 | Matej Mohorič | Slovenia | Bahrain–McLaren | 25 | 76 | + 3h 49' 02" | |
| 67 | Wout Poels | Netherlands | Bahrain–McLaren | 32 | 110 | + 4h 47' 23" | |
| 68 | Rafael Valls | Spain | Bahrain–McLaren | 33 | DNS-2 | – | |
| 71 | Rigoberto Urán | Colombia | EF Pro Cycling | 33 | 8 | + 8' 02" | |
| 72 | Alberto Bettiol | Italy | EF Pro Cycling | 26 | 62 | + 3h 24' 55" | |
| 73 | Hugh Carthy | Great Britain | EF Pro Cycling | 26 | 37 | + 2h 20' 31" | |
| 74 | Sergio Higuita ‡ | Colombia | EF Pro Cycling | 23 | DNF-15 | – | |
| 75 | Jens Keukeleire | Belgium | EF Pro Cycling | 31 | 89 | + 4h 18' 47" | |
| 76 | Daniel Martínez ‡ | Colombia | EF Pro Cycling | 24 | 28 | + 1h 55' 12" | |
| 77 | Neilson Powless ‡ | United States | EF Pro Cycling | 23 | 56 | + 3h 03' 09" | |
| 78 | Tejay van Garderen | United States | EF Pro Cycling | 32 | 91 | + 4h 22' 20" | |
| 81 | Nairo Quintana | Colombia | Arkéa–Samsic | 30 | 17 | + 1h 03' 07" | |
| 82 | Winner Anacona | Colombia | Arkéa–Samsic | 32 | 66 | + 3h 32' 40" | |
| 83 | Warren Barguil | France | Arkéa–Samsic | 28 | 14 | + 31' 04" | |
| 84 | Kévin Ledanois | France | Arkéa–Samsic | 27 | 102 | + 4h 35' 48" | |
| 85 | Dayer Quintana | Colombia | Arkéa–Samsic | 28 | 95 | + 4h 25' 50" | |
| 86 | Diego Rosa | Italy | Arkéa–Samsic | 31 | DNF-8 | – | |
| 87 | Clément Russo ‡ | France | Arkéa–Samsic | 25 | 133 | + 5h 28' 45" | |
| 88 | Connor Swift ‡ | Great Britain | Arkéa–Samsic | 24 | 106 | + 4h 41' 59" | |
| 91 | Alejandro Valverde | Spain | Movistar Team | 40 | 12 | + 17' 41" | |
| 92 | Dario Cataldo | Italy | Movistar Team | 35 | 80 | + 3h 52' 51" | |
| 93 | Imanol Erviti | Spain | Movistar Team | 36 | 74 | + 3h 48' 00" | |
| 94 | Enric Mas ‡ | Spain | Movistar Team | 25 | 5 | + 6' 07" | |
| 95 | Nelson Oliveira | Portugal | Movistar Team | 31 | 55 | + 3h 01' 41" | |
| 96 | José Joaquín Rojas | Spain | Movistar Team | 35 | 70 | + 3h 40' 49" | |
| 97 | Marc Soler | Spain | Movistar Team | 26 | 21 | + 1h 31' 53" | |
| 98 | Carlos Verona | Spain | Movistar Team | 27 | 19 | + 1h 19' 54" | |
| 101 | Richie Porte | Australia | Trek–Segafredo | 35 | 3 | + 3' 30" | |
| 102 | Niklas Eg ‡ | Denmark | Trek–Segafredo | 25 | 51 | + 2h 50' 04" | |
| 103 | Kenny Elissonde | France | Trek–Segafredo | 29 | 25 | + 1h 40' 06" | |
| 104 | Bauke Mollema | Netherlands | Trek–Segafredo | 33 | DNF-13 | – | |
| 105 | Mads Pedersen ‡ | Denmark | Trek–Segafredo | 24 | 124 | + 5h 11' 03" | |
| 106 | Toms Skujiņš | Latvia | Trek–Segafredo | 29 | 81 | + 3h 53' 09" | |
| 107 | Jasper Stuyven | Belgium | Trek–Segafredo | 28 | 71 | + 3h 40' 52" | |
| 108 | Edward Theuns | Belgium | Trek–Segafredo | 29 | 119 | + 5h 08' 10" | |
| 111 | Greg Van Avermaet | Belgium | CCC Team | 35 | 50 | + 2h 49' 50" | |
| 112 | Alessandro De Marchi | Italy | CCC Team | 34 | 100 | + 4h 34' 06" | |
| 113 | Simon Geschke | Germany | CCC Team | 34 | 48 | + 2h 44' 27" | |
| 114 | Jan Hirt | Czech Republic | CCC Team | 29 | 67 | + 3h 34' 58" | |
| 115 | Jonas Koch | Germany | CCC Team | 27 | 125 | + 5h 12' 04" | |
| 116 | Michael Schär | Switzerland | CCC Team | 33 | 69 | + 3h 38' 55" | |
| 117 | Matteo Trentin | Italy | CCC Team | 31 | 79 | + 3h 52' 10" | |
| 118 | Ilnur Zakarin | Russia | CCC Team | 30 | DNF-12 | – | |
| 121 | Guillaume Martin | France | Cofidis | 27 | 11 | + 16' 58" | |
| 122 | Simone Consonni | Italy | Cofidis | 25 | 112 | + 4h 53' 50" | |
| 123 | Nicolas Edet | France | Cofidis | 32 | 49 | + 2h 48' 44" | |
| 124 | Jesús Herrada | Spain | Cofidis | 30 | 44 | + 2h 34' 50" | |
| 125 | Christophe Laporte | France | Cofidis | 27 | 107 | + 4h 44' 30" | |
| 126 | Anthony Perez | France | Cofidis | 29 | DNF-3 | – | |
| 127 | Pierre-Luc Périchon | France | Cofidis | 33 | 86 | + 4h 14' 28" | |
| 128 | Elia Viviani | Italy | Cofidis | 31 | 135 | + 5h 30' 01" | |
| 131 | Tadej Pogačar ‡ | Slovenia | UAE Team Emirates | 21 | 1 | 87h 20' 05" | |
| 132 | Fabio Aru | Italy | UAE Team Emirates | 30 | DNF-9 | – | |
| 133 | David de la Cruz | Spain | UAE Team Emirates | 31 | 72 | + 3h 41' 20" | |
| 134 | Davide Formolo | Italy | UAE Team Emirates | 27 | DNS-11 | – | |
| 135 | Alexander Kristoff | Norway | UAE Team Emirates | 33 | 132 | + 5h 28' 28" | |
| 136 | Vegard Stake Laengen | Norway | UAE Team Emirates | 31 | 82 | + 3h 53' 17" | |
| 137 | Marco Marcato | Italy | UAE Team Emirates | 36 | 111 | + 4h 48' 47" | |
| 138 | Jan Polanc | Slovenia | UAE Team Emirates | 28 | 40 | + 2h 29' 54" | |
| 141 | Miguel Ángel López | Colombia | Astana | 26 | 6 | + 6' 47" | |
| 142 | Omar Fraile | Spain | Astana | 30 | 60 | + 3h 13' 41" | |
| 143 | Hugo Houle | Canada | Astana | 29 | 47 | + 2h 39' 54" | |
| 144 | Gorka Izagirre | Spain | Astana | 32 | 22 | + 1h 36' 12" | |
| 145 | Ion Izagirre | Spain | Astana | 31 | DNF-11 | – | |
| 146 | Alexey Lutsenko | Kazakhstan | Astana | 27 | 46 | + 2h 39' 37" | |
| 147 | Luis León Sánchez | Spain | Astana | 36 | 32 | + 2h 13' 47" | |
| 148 | Harold Tejada ‡ | Colombia | Astana | 23 | 45 | + 2h 37' 02" | |
| 151 | Caleb Ewan | Australia | Lotto–Soudal | 26 | 144 | + 5h 50' 25" | |
| 152 | Steff Cras ‡ | Belgium | Lotto–Soudal | 24 | DNF-9 | – | |
| 153 | Jasper De Buyst | Belgium | Lotto–Soudal | 26 | 142 | + 5h 43' 07" | |
| 154 | Thomas De Gendt | Belgium | Lotto–Soudal | 33 | 52 | + 2h 51' 56" | |
| 155 | John Degenkolb | Germany | Lotto–Soudal | 31 | HD-1 | – | |
| 156 | Frederik Frison | Belgium | Lotto–Soudal | 28 | 145 | + 6h 01' 48" | |
| 157 | Philippe Gilbert | Belgium | Lotto–Soudal | 38 | DNS-2 | – | |
| 158 | Roger Kluge | Germany | Lotto–Soudal | 34 | 146 | + 6h 07' 02" | |
| 161 | Adam Yates | Great Britain | Mitchelton–Scott | 28 | 9 | + 9' 25" | |
| 162 | Jack Bauer | New Zealand | Mitchelton–Scott | 35 | 83 | + 4h 00' 34" | |
| 163 | Sam Bewley | New Zealand | Mitchelton–Scott | 33 | DNF-10 | – | |
| 164 | Esteban Chaves | Colombia | Mitchelton–Scott | 30 | 23 | + 1h 38' 45" | |
| 165 | Daryl Impey | South Africa | Mitchelton–Scott | 35 | 97 | + 4h 28' 39" | |
| 166 | Christopher Juul-Jensen | Denmark | Mitchelton–Scott | 31 | 99 | + 4h 34' 03" | |
| 167 | Luka Mezgec | Slovenia | Mitchelton–Scott | 32 | 88 | + 4h 17' 07" | |
| 168 | Mikel Nieve | Spain | Mitchelton–Scott | 36 | DNF-17 | – | |
| 171 | Dan Martin | Ireland | Israel Start-Up Nation | 34 | 41 | + 2h 30' 25" | |
| 172 | André Greipel | Germany | Israel Start-Up Nation | 38 | DNF-18 | – | |
| 173 | Ben Hermans | Belgium | Israel Start-Up Nation | 34 | 68 | + 3h 37' 12" | |
| 174 | Hugo Hofstetter | France | Israel Start-Up Nation | 26 | 115 | + 5h 00' 14" | |
| 175 | Krists Neilands | Latvia | Israel Start-Up Nation | 26 | 85 | + 4h 11' 03" | |
| 176 | Guy Niv | Israel | Israel Start-Up Nation | 26 | 139 | + 5h 34' 43" | |
| 177 | Nils Politt | Germany | Israel Start-Up Nation | 26 | 120 | + 5h 09' 02" | |
| 178 | Tom Van Asbroeck | Belgium | Israel Start-Up Nation | 30 | 98 | + 4h 33' 17" | |
| 181 | Niccolò Bonifazio | Italy | Total Direct Énergie | 26 | 141 | + 5h 42' 13" | |
| 182 | Mathieu Burgaudeau ‡ | France | Total Direct Énergie | 21 | 131 | + 5h 27' 38" | |
| 183 | Lilian Calmejane | France | Total Direct Énergie | 27 | DNF-8 | – | |
| 184 | Jérôme Cousin | France | Total Direct Énergie | 31 | HD-16 | – | |
| 185 | Fabien Grellier | France | Total Direct Énergie | 25 | 117 | + 5h 01' 32" | |
| 186 | Romain Sicard | France | Total Direct Énergie | 32 | 31 | + 2h 13' 02" | |
| 187 | Geoffrey Soupe | France | Total Direct Énergie | 32 | 123 | + 5h 10' 40" | |
| 188 | Anthony Turgis | France | Total Direct Énergie | 26 | 108 | + 4h 44' 57" | |
| 191 | Giacomo Nizzolo | Italy | NTT Pro Cycling | 31 | DNF-8 | – | |
| 192 | Edvald Boasson Hagen | Norway | NTT Pro Cycling | 33 | 101 | + 4h 34' 19" | |
| 193 | Ryan Gibbons | South Africa | NTT Pro Cycling | 26 | 121 | + 5h 09' 32" | |
| 194 | Michael Gogl | Austria | NTT Pro Cycling | 26 | DNS-19 | – | |
| 195 | Michael Valgren | Denmark | NTT Pro Cycling | 28 | 73 | + 3h 41' 45" | |
| 196 | Roman Kreuziger | Czech Republic | NTT Pro Cycling | 34 | 109 | + 4h 45' 26" | |
| 197 | Domenico Pozzovivo | Italy | NTT Pro Cycling | 37 | DNS-10 | – | |
| 198 | Max Walscheid | Germany | NTT Pro Cycling | 27 | 134 | + 5h 29' 38" | |
| 201 | Tiesj Benoot | Belgium | Team Sunweb | 26 | 75 | + 3h 48' 50" | |
| 202 | Nikias Arndt | Germany | Team Sunweb | 28 | 126 | + 5h 13' 11" | |
| 203 | Cees Bol ‡ | Netherlands | Team Sunweb | 25 | 140 | + 5h 38' 16" | |
| 204 | Marc Hirschi ‡ | Switzerland | Team Sunweb | 22 | 54 | + 2h 54' 34" | |
| 205 | Søren Kragh Andersen | Denmark | Team Sunweb | 26 | 58 | + 3h 06' 26" | |
| 206 | Joris Nieuwenhuis ‡ | Netherlands | Team Sunweb | 24 | 103 | + 4h 38' 50" | |
| 207 | Casper Pedersen ‡ | Denmark | Team Sunweb | 24 | 92 | + 4h 24' 13" | |
| 208 | Nicolas Roche | Ireland | Team Sunweb | 36 | 64 | + 3h 27' 13" | |
| 211 | Bryan Coquard | France | B&B Hotels–Vital Concept | 28 | 122 | + 5h 10' 32" | |
| 212 | Cyril Barthe ‡ | France | B&B Hotels–Vital Concept | 24 | 96 | + 4h 27' 07" | |
| 213 | Maxime Chevalier ‡ | France | B&B Hotels–Vital Concept | 21 | 136 | + 5h 31' 30" | |
| 214 | Jens Debusschere | Belgium | B&B Hotels–Vital Concept | 31 | HD-17 | – | |
| 215 | Cyril Gautier | France | B&B Hotels–Vital Concept | 32 | 78 | + 3h 51' 57" | |
| 216 | Quentin Pacher | France | B&B Hotels–Vital Concept | 28 | 53 | + 2h 54' 17" | |
| 217 | Kévin Réza | France | B&B Hotels–Vital Concept | 32 | 137 | + 5h 31' 37" | |
| 218 | Pierre Rolland | France | B&B Hotels–Vital Concept | 33 | 18 | + 1h 08' 26" | |

=== By team ===
Ineos Grenadiers (IGD)
| No. | Rider | Pos. |
|---|---|---|
| 1 | Egan Bernal (COL) | DNS-17 |
| 2 | Andrey Amador (CRC) | 77 |
| 3 | Richard Carapaz (ECU) | 13 |
| 4 | Jonathan Castroviejo (ESP) | DNS-19 |
| 5 | Michał Kwiatkowski (POL) | 30 |
| 6 | Luke Rowe (GBR) | 129 |
| 7 | Pavel Sivakov (RUS) | 87 |
| 8 | Dylan van Baarle (NED) | 59 |
Directeur sportif: Gabriel Rasch/Servais Knaven

Team Jumbo–Visma (TJV)
| No. | Rider | Pos. |
|---|---|---|
| 11 | Primož Roglič (SLO) | 2 |
| 12 | George Bennett (NZL) | 34 |
| 13 | Amund Grøndahl Jansen (NOR) | 128 |
| 14 | Tom Dumoulin (NED) | 7 |
| 15 | Robert Gesink (NED) | 42 |
| 16 | Sepp Kuss (USA) | 15 |
| 17 | Tony Martin (GER) | 118 |
| 18 | Wout Van Aert (BEL) | 20 |
Directeur sportif: Frans Maassen/Grischa Niermann

Bora–Hansgrohe (BOH)
| No. | Rider | Pos. |
|---|---|---|
| 21 | Peter Sagan (SVK) | 84 |
| 22 | Emanuel Buchmann (GER) | 38 |
| 23 | Felix Großschartner (AUT) | 63 |
| 24 | Lennard Kämna (GER) | 33 |
| 25 | Gregor Mühlberger (AUT) | DNF-11 |
| 26 | Daniel Oss (ITA) | 105 |
| 27 | Lukas Pöstlberger (AUT) | DNF-19 |
| 28 | Maximilian Schachmann (GER) | 57 |
Directeur sportif: Enrico Poitschke/Ján Valach

AG2R La Mondiale (ALM)
| No. | Rider | Pos. |
|---|---|---|
| 31 | Romain Bardet (FRA) | DNS-14 |
| 32 | Mikaël Cherel (FRA) | 26 |
| 33 | Benoît Cosnefroy (FRA) | 116 |
| 34 | Pierre Latour (FRA) | DNF-14 |
| 35 | Oliver Naesen (BEL) | 61 |
| 36 | Nans Peters (FRA) | 65 |
| 37 | Clément Venturini (FRA) | 104 |
| 38 | Alexis Vuillermoz (FRA) | 35 |
Directeur sportif: Julien Jurdie/Stéphane Goubert

Deceuninck–Quick-Step (DQT)
| No. | Rider | Pos. |
|---|---|---|
| 41 | Julian Alaphilippe (FRA) | 36 |
| 42 | Kasper Asgreen (DEN) | 114 |
| 43 | Sam Bennett (IRL) | 138 |
| 44 | Rémi Cavagna (FRA) | 113 |
| 45 | Tim Declercq (BEL) | 127 |
| 46 | Dries Devenyns (BEL) | 90 |
| 47 | Bob Jungels (LUX) | 43 |
| 48 | Michael Mørkøv (DEN) | 130 |
Directeur sportif: Tom Steels/Wilfried Peeters

Groupama–FDJ (GFC)
| No. | Rider | Pos. |
|---|---|---|
| 51 | Thibaut Pinot (FRA) | 29 |
| 52 | William Bonnet (FRA) | DNF-8 |
| 53 | David Gaudu (FRA) | DNF-16 |
| 54 | Stefan Küng (SUI) | DNS-17 |
| 55 | Mathieu Ladagnous (FRA) | 94 |
| 56 | Valentin Madouas (FRA) | 27 |
| 57 | Rudy Molard (FRA) | 39 |
| 58 | Sébastien Reichenbach (SUI) | 24 |
Directeur sportif: Thierry Bricaud/Philippe Mauduit

Bahrain–McLaren (TBM)
| No. | Rider | Pos. |
|---|---|---|
| 61 | Mikel Landa (ESP) | 4 |
| 62 | Pello Bilbao (ESP) | 16 |
| 63 | Damiano Caruso (ITA) | 10 |
| 64 | Sonny Colbrelli (ITA) | 93 |
| 65 | Marco Haller (AUT) | 143 |
| 66 | Matej Mohorič (SLO) | 76 |
| 67 | Wout Poels (NED) | 110 |
| 68 | Rafael Valls (ESP) | DNS-2 |
Directeur sportif: Roger Hammond/Gorazd Štangelj

EF Pro Cycling (EF1)
| No. | Rider | Pos. |
|---|---|---|
| 71 | Rigoberto Urán (COL) | 8 |
| 72 | Alberto Bettiol (ITA) | 62 |
| 73 | Hugh Carthy (GBR) | 37 |
| 74 | Sergio Higuita (COL) | DNF-15 |
| 75 | Jens Keukeleire (BEL) | 89 |
| 76 | Daniel Martínez (COL) | 28 |
| 77 | Neilson Powless (USA) | 56 |
| 78 | Tejay Van Garderen (USA) | 91 |
Directeur sportif: Charly Wegelius/Andreas Klier

Arkéa–Samsic (ARK)
| No. | Rider | Pos. |
|---|---|---|
| 81 | Nairo Quintana (COL) | 17 |
| 82 | Winner Anacona (COL) | 66 |
| 83 | Warren Barguil (FRA) | 14 |
| 84 | Kévin Ledanois (FRA) | 102 |
| 85 | Dayer Quintana (COL) | 95 |
| 86 | Diego Rosa (ITA) | DNF-8 |
| 87 | Clément Russo (FRA) | 133 |
| 88 | Connor Swift (GBR) | 106 |
Directeur sportif: Yvon Ledanois/Yvon Caer

Movistar Team (MOV)
| No. | Rider | Pos. |
|---|---|---|
| 91 | Alejandro Valverde (ESP) | 12 |
| 92 | Dario Cataldo (ITA) | 80 |
| 93 | Imanol Erviti (ESP) | 74 |
| 94 | Enric Mas (ESP) | 5 |
| 95 | Nelson Oliveira (POR) | 55 |
| 96 | José Joaquín Rojas (ESP) | 70 |
| 97 | Marc Soler (ESP) | 21 |
| 98 | Carlos Verona (ESP) | 19 |
Directeur sportif: José Luis Arrieta

Trek–Segafredo (TFS)
| No. | Rider | Pos. |
|---|---|---|
| 101 | Richie Porte (AUS) | 3 |
| 102 | Niklas Eg (DEN) | 51 |
| 103 | Kenny Elissonde (FRA) | 25 |
| 104 | Bauke Mollema (NED) | DNF-13 |
| 105 | Mads Pedersen (DEN) | 124 |
| 106 | Toms Skujiņš (LVA) | 81 |
| 107 | Jasper Stuyven (BEL) | 71 |
| 108 | Edward Theuns (BEL) | 119 |
Directeur sportif: Steven de Jongh/Kim Andersen

CCC Team (CCC)
| No. | Rider | Pos. |
|---|---|---|
| 111 | Greg Van Avermaet (BEL) | 50 |
| 112 | Alessandro De Marchi (ITA) | 100 |
| 113 | Simon Geschke (GER) | 48 |
| 114 | Jan Hirt (CZE) | 67 |
| 115 | Jonas Koch (GER) | 125 |
| 116 | Michael Schär (SUI) | 69 |
| 117 | Matteo Trentin (ITA) | 79 |
| 118 | Ilnur Zakarin (RUS) | DNF-12 |
Directeur sportif: Fabio Baldato/Steve Bauer

Cofidis (COF)
| No. | Rider | Pos. |
|---|---|---|
| 121 | Guillaume Martin (FRA) | 11 |
| 122 | Simone Consonni (ITA) | 112 |
| 123 | Nicolas Edet (FRA) | 49 |
| 124 | Jesús Herrada (ESP) | 44 |
| 125 | Christophe Laporte (FRA) | 107 |
| 126 | Anthony Perez (FRA) | DNF-3 |
| 127 | Pierre-Luc Périchon (FRA) | 86 |
| 128 | Elia Viviani (ITA) | 135 |
Directeur sportif: Roberto Damiani/Thierry Marichal

UAE Team Emirates (UAD)
| No. | Rider | Pos. |
|---|---|---|
| 131 | Tadej Pogačar (SLO) | 1 |
| 132 | Fabio Aru (ITA) | DNF-9 |
| 133 | David de la Cruz (ESP) | 72 |
| 134 | Davide Formolo (ITA) | DNS-11 |
| 135 | Alexander Kristoff (NOR) | 132 |
| 136 | Vegard Stake Laengen (NOR) | 82 |
| 137 | Marco Marcato (ITA) | 111 |
| 138 | Jan Polanc (SLO) | 40 |
Directeur sportif: José Antonio Fernandez/Simone Pedrazzini

Astana (AST)
| No. | Rider | Pos. |
|---|---|---|
| 141 | Miguel Ángel López (COL) | 6 |
| 142 | Omar Fraile (ESP) | 60 |
| 143 | Hugo Houle (CAN) | 47 |
| 144 | Gorka Izagirre (ESP) | 22 |
| 145 | Ion Izagirre (ESP) | DNF-11 |
| 146 | Alexey Lutsenko (KAZ) | 46 |
| 147 | Luis León Sánchez (ESP) | 32 |
| 148 | Harold Tejada (COL) | 45 |
Directeur sportif: Dmitry Fofonov/Dmitri Sedoun

Lotto–Soudal (LTS)
| No. | Rider | Pos. |
|---|---|---|
| 151 | Caleb Ewan (AUS) | 144 |
| 152 | Steff Cras (BEL) | DNF-9 |
| 153 | Jasper De Buyst (BEL) | 142 |
| 154 | Thomas De Gendt (BEL) | 52 |
| 155 | John Degenkolb (GER) | HD-1 |
| 156 | Frederik Frison (BEL) | 145 |
| 157 | Philippe Gilbert (BEL) | DNS-2 |
| 158 | Roger Kluge (GER) | 146 |
Directeur sportif: Mario Aerts/Herman Frison

Mitchelton–Scott (MTS)
| No. | Rider | Pos. |
|---|---|---|
| 161 | Adam Yates (GBR) | 9 |
| 162 | Jack Bauer (NZL) | 83 |
| 163 | Sam Bewley (NZL) | DNF-10 |
| 164 | Esteban Chaves (COL) | 23 |
| 165 | Daryl Impey (RSA) | 97 |
| 166 | Christopher Juul-Jensen (DEN) | 99 |
| 167 | Luka Mezgec (SLO) | 88 |
| 168 | Mikel Nieve (ESP) | DNF-17 |
Directeur sportif: Matt White/Matthew Wilson

Israel Start-Up Nation (ISN)
| No. | Rider | Pos. |
|---|---|---|
| 171 | Dan Martin (IRL) | 41 |
| 172 | André Greipel (GER) | DNF-18 |
| 173 | Ben Hermans (BEL) | 68 |
| 174 | Hugo Hofstetter (FRA) | 115 |
| 175 | Krists Neilands (LVA) | 85 |
| 176 | Guy Niv (ISR) | 139 |
| 177 | Nils Politt (GER) | 120 |
| 178 | Tom Van Asbroeck (BEL) | 98 |
Directeur sportif: Lionel Marie/Eric Van Lancker

Total Direct Énergie (TDE)
| No. | Rider | Pos. |
|---|---|---|
| 181 | Niccolò Bonifazio (ITA) | 141 |
| 182 | Mathieu Burgaudeau (FRA) | 131 |
| 183 | Lilian Calmejane (FRA) | DNF-8 |
| 184 | Jérôme Cousin (FRA) | HD-16 |
| 185 | Fabien Grellier (FRA) | 117 |
| 186 | Romain Sicard (FRA) | 31 |
| 187 | Geoffrey Soupe (FRA) | 123 |
| 188 | Anthony Turgis (FRA) | 108 |
Directeur sportif: Benoît Génauzeau/Dominique Arnould

NTT Pro Cycling (NTT)
| No. | Rider | Pos. |
|---|---|---|
| 191 | Giacomo Nizzolo (ITA) | DNF-8 |
| 192 | Edvald Boasson Hagen (NOR) | 101 |
| 193 | Ryan Gibbons (RSA) | 121 |
| 194 | Michael Gogl (AUT) | DNS-19 |
| 195 | Michael Valgren (DEN) | 73 |
| 196 | Roman Kreuziger (CZE) | 109 |
| 197 | Domenico Pozzovivo (ITA) | DNS-10 |
| 198 | Max Walscheid (GER) | 134 |
Directeur sportif: Lars Michaelsen/Gino Vanoudenhove

Team Sunweb (SUN)
| No. | Rider | Pos. |
|---|---|---|
| 201 | Tiesj Benoot (BEL) | 75 |
| 202 | Nikias Arndt (GER) | 126 |
| 203 | Cees Bol (NED) | 140 |
| 204 | Marc Hirschi (SUI) | 54 |
| 205 | Søren Kragh Andersen (DEN) | 58 |
| 206 | Joris Nieuwenhuis (NED) | 103 |
| 207 | Casper Pedersen (DEN) | 92 |
| 208 | Nicolas Roche (IRL) | 64 |
Directeur sportif: Matthew Winston

B&B Hotels–Vital Concept (BVC)
| No. | Rider | Pos. |
|---|---|---|
| 211 | Bryan Coquard (FRA) | 122 |
| 212 | Cyril Barthe (FRA) | 96 |
| 213 | Maxime Chevalier (FRA) | 136 |
| 214 | Jens Debusschere (BEL) | HD-17 |
| 215 | Cyril Gautier (FRA) | 78 |
| 216 | Quentin Pacher (FRA) | 53 |
| 217 | Kévin Réza (FRA) | 137 |
| 218 | Pierre Rolland (FRA) | 18 |
Directeur sportif: Didier Rous/Jimmy Engoulvent

=== By nationality ===
The 176 riders that are competing in the 2020 Tour de France originated from 30 different countries.

| Country | No. of riders | Finishers | Stage wins |
|---|---|---|---|
| Australia | 2 | 2 | 2 (Caleb Ewan x2) |
| Austria | 5 | 2 | |
| Belgium | 17 | 14 | 2 (Wout van Aert x2) |
| Canada | 1 | 1 | |
| Colombia | 10 | 8 | 2 (Miguel Ángel López, Daniel Martínez) |
| Costa Rica | 1 | 1 | |
| Czech Republic | 2 | 2 | |
| Denmark | 8 | 8 | 2 (Søren Kragh Andersen x2) |
| Ecuador | 1 | 1 | |
| France | 39 | 32 | 2 (Julian Alaphilippe, Nans Peters) |
| Germany | 12 | 10 | 1 (Lennard Kämna) |
| Great Britain | 4 | 4 | |
| Ireland | 3 | 3 | 2 (Sam Bennett x2) |
| Israel | 1 | 1 | |
| Italy | 16 | 11 | |
| Kazakhstan | 1 | 1 | 1 (Alexey Lutsenko) |
| Latvia | 2 | 2 | |
| Luxembourg | 1 | 1 | |
| Netherlands | 7 | 6 | |
| New Zealand | 3 | 2 | |
| Norway | 4 | 4 | 1 (Alexander Kristoff) |
| Poland | 1 | 1 | 1 (Michał Kwiatkowski) |
| Portugal | 1 | 1 | |
| Russia | 2 | 1 | |
| Slovakia | 1 | 1 | |
| Slovenia | 5 | 5 | 4 (Tadej Pogačar x3, Primož Roglič) |
| South Africa | 2 | 2 | |
| Spain | 17 | 13 | |
| Switzerland | 4 | 3 | 1 (Marc Hirschi) |
| United States | 3 | 3 | |
| Total | 176 | 146 | 21 |
