= 2022 Bora–Hansgrohe season =

Bora–Hansgrohe
- 2022 season
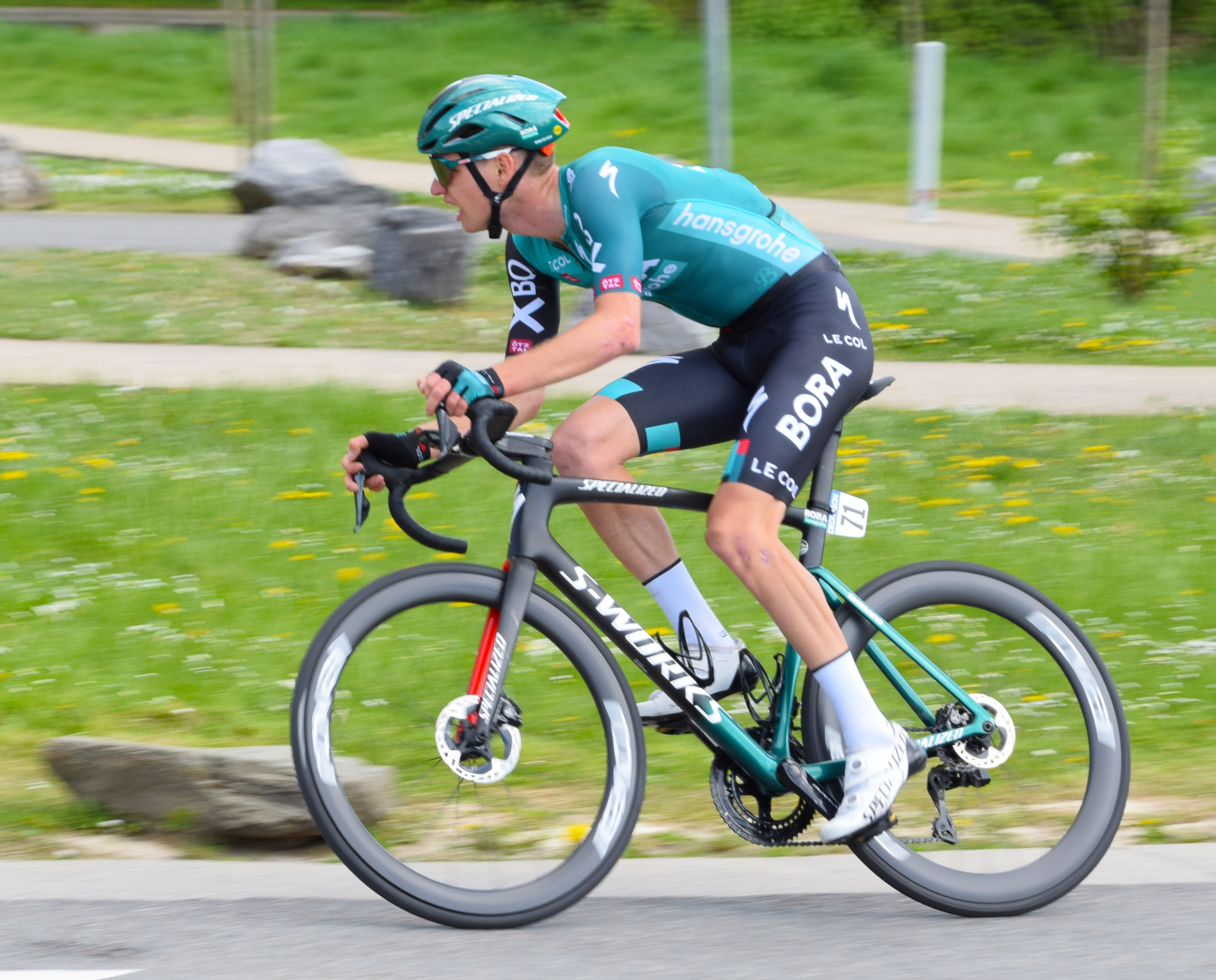
- Aleksandr Vlasov during Liège–Bastogne–Liège
- UCI code: BOH
- Status: UCI WorldTeam
- Manager: Ralph Denk (GER)
- Main sponsor(s): BORA; Hansgrohe
- Based: Germany
- Bicycles: Specialized
- Groupset: Shimano

Season victories
- One-day races: 2
- Stage race overall: 3
- Stage race stages: 9
- Grand Tours: 1
- National Championships: 1
- Jersey

The 2022 season for Bora–Hansgrohe is its 13th season overall and its sixth season as a UCI WorldTeam. It is also the sixth season under the current name. They use Specialized bicycles, Shimano drivetrain, Roval wheels and Sportful clothing.

== Team roster ==
As of 10 January 2022.

Rider	Date of birth
Giovanni Aleotti (ITA)	25 May 1999 (aged 21)
Shane Archbold (NZL)	2 February 1989 (aged 31)
Cesare Benedetti (POL)	3 August 1987 (aged 33)
Sam Bennett (IRL)	16 October 1990 (aged 30)
Emanuel Buchmann (GER)	18 November 1992 (aged 28)
Matteo Fabbro (ITA)	10 April 1995 (aged 25)
Patrick Gamper (AUT)	18 February 1997 (aged 23)
Felix Großschartner (AUT)	23 December 1993 (aged 27)
Marco Haller (AUT)	1 April 1991 (aged 29)
Sergio Higuita (COL)	1 August 1997 (aged 23)
Jai Hindley (AUS)	5 May 1996 (aged 24)
Lennard Kämna (GER)	9 September 1996 (aged 24)
Wilco Kelderman (NED)	25 March 1991 (aged 29)
Jonas Koch (GER)	25 June 1993 (aged 27)
Patrick Konrad (AUT)	13 October 1991 (aged 29)

Rider	Date of birth
Martin Laas (EST)	15 September 1993 (aged 27)
Luis-Joe Lührs (GER)	20 January 2003 (aged 17)
Jordi Meeus (BEL)	1 July 1998 (aged 22)
Ryan Mullen (IRL)	7 August 1994 (aged 26)
Anton Palzer (GER)	11 March 1993 (aged 27)
Nils Politt (GER)	6 March 1994 (aged 26)
Lukas Pöstlberger (AUT)	10 January 1992 (aged 28)
Maximilian Schachmann (GER)	9 January 1994 (aged 26)
Ide Schelling (NED)	6 February 1998 (aged 22)
Cian Uijtdebroeks (BEL)	28 February 2003 (aged 17)
Danny van Poppel (NED)	26 July 1993 (aged 27)
Aleksandr Vlasov (Note: As of 1 March 2022, the UCI announced that cyclists from Russia and Belarus would no longer compete under the name or flag of those respective countries due to the Russian invasion of Ukraine.) (blank)	23 April 1996 (aged 24)
Matthew Walls (GBR)	20 April 1998 (aged 22)
Frederik Wandahl (DEN)	9 May 2001 (aged 19)
Ben Zwiehoff (GER)	22 February 1994 (aged 26)

Riders who joined the team for the 2022 season

Rider	2021 team
Shane Archbold	Deceuninck–Quick-Step
Sam Bennett	Deceuninck–Quick-Step
Marco Haller	Team Bahrain Victorious
Sergio Higuita	EF Education–Nippo
Jai Hindley	Team DSM
Jonas Koch	Intermarché–Wanty–Gobert Matériaux
Luis-Joe Lührs	neo-pro (Team Auto Eder Bayern)
Ryan Mullen	Trek–Segafredo
Cian Uijtdebroeks	neo-pro (Team Auto Eder Bayern)
Danny van Poppel	Intermarché–Wanty–Gobert Matériaux
Aleksandr Vlasov	Astana–Premier Tech

Riders who left the team during or after the 2021 season

Rider	2022 team
Pascal Ackermann	UAE Team Emirates
Erik Baška	Dukla Banská Bystrica
Maciej Bodnar	Team TotalEnergies
Marcus Burghardt	
Daniel Oss	Team TotalEnergies
Juraj Sagan	Team TotalEnergies
Peter Sagan	Team TotalEnergies
Andreas Schillinger	Retired
Michael Schwarzmann	Lotto–Soudal
Rüdiger Selig	Lotto–Soudal

== Season victories ==
Date	Race	Competition	Rider	Country	Location	Ref.
4 February	Volta a la Comunitat Valenciana, Stage 3	UCI ProSeries	Aleksandr Vlasov (RUS)	Spain	Alto de las Antenas del Maigmó Tibi	
4 February	Volta a la Comunitat Valenciana, Overall	UCI ProSeries	Aleksandr Vlasov (RUS)	Spain		
20 February	Vuelta a Andalucía, Stage 5	UCI ProSeries	Lennard Kämna (GER)	Spain	Chiclana de Segura	
20 February	Volta ao Algarve, Stage 5	UCI ProSeries	Sergio Higuita (COL)	Portugal	Alto do Malhão (Loulé)	
27 March	Volta a Catalunya, Overall	UCI World Tour	Sergio Higuita (COL)	Spain		
27 March	Volta a Catalunya, Mountains classification	UCI World Tour	Sergio Higuita (COL)	Spain		
27 March	Volta a Catalunya, Young rider classification	UCI World Tour	Sergio Higuita (COL)	Spain		
20 April	Tour of the Alps, Stage 3	UCI ProSeries	Lennard Kämna (GER)	Italy	Villabassa	
30 April	Tour de Romandie, Stage 4	UCI World Tour	Sergio Higuita (COL)	Switzerland	Zinal	
1 May	Tour de Romandie, Stage 5 (ITT)	UCI World Tour	Aleksandr Vlasov (blank)	Switzerland	Villars	
1 May	Tour de Romandie, Overall	UCI World Tour	Aleksandr Vlasov (blank)	Switzerland		
1 May	Eschborn–Frankfurt	UCI World Tour	Sam Bennett (IRL)	Germany	Frankfurt	
10 May	Giro d'Italia, Stage 4	UCI World Tour	Lennard Kämna (GER)	Italy	Etna-Nicolosi (Rifugio Sapienza)	
15 May	Giro d'Italia, Stage 9	UCI World Tour	Jai Hindley (AUS)	Italy	Blockhaus	
22 May	Rund um Köln	UCI Europe Tour	Nils Politt (GER)	Germany	Cologne	
27 May	Tour of Norway, Stage 4	UCI ProSeries	Marco Haller (AUT)	Norway	Kristiansand	
29 May	Giro d'Italia, Overall	UCI World Tour	Jai Hindley (AUS)	Italy		

== National, Continental, and World Champions ==
Date	Discipline	Jersey	Rider	Country	Location	Ref.
13 February	Colombian National Road Race Championships		Sergio Higuita (COL)	Colombia	Pereira	
