= 2014 Clásica de Almería =

Race details
- Dates: 2 March 2014
- Stages: 1
- Distance: 178 km (110.6 mi)
- Winning time: 4h 21' 33"

Results
	Winner	Sam Bennett (IRL)
	Second	Juan José Lobato (ESP)
	Third	Davide Viganò (ITA)

The 2014 Clásica de Almería was the 29th edition of the Clásica de Almería cycle race and was held on 2 March 2014. The race started in Almería and finished in Roquetas de Mar. The race was won by Sam Bennett.

== General classification ==
Final general classification

Rank	Rider	Time
1	Sam Bennett (IRL)	4h 21' 33"
2	Juan José Lobato (ESP)	+ 0"
3	Davide Viganò (ITA)	+ 0"
4	Francisco Ventoso (ESP)	+ 0"
5	Stéphane Poulhies (FRA)	+ 0"
6	José Joaquín Rojas (ESP)	+ 2"
7	Bartłomiej Matysiak (POL)	+ 2"
8	Luis Ángel Maté (ESP)	+ 2"
9	Tiago Machado (POR)	+ 6"
10	Davide Rebellin (ITA)	+ 6"
