= 2021 Classic Brugge–De Panne =

Cycling race

2021 UCI World Tour, race 8 of 29

Race details
- Dates: 24 March 2021
- Stages: 1
- Distance: 203.9 km (126.7 mi)
- Winning time: 4h 27' 40"

Results
	Winner	Sam Bennett (IRL)	(Deceuninck–Quick-Step)
	Second	Jasper Philipsen (BEL)	(Alpecin–Fenix)
	Third	Pascal Ackermann (GER)	(Bora–Hansgrohe)

The 2021 Classic Brugge–De Panne (known as Oxyclean Classic Brugge–De Panne for sponsorship reasons) was a road cycling one-day race that took place on 24 March 2021 in Belgium. It was the 45th edition of the Three Days of Bruges–De Panne, and the 8th event of the 2021 UCI World Tour.

== Teams ==
Twenty-five teams were invited to the race, including seventeen UCI WorldTeams and eight UCI ProTeams. Team BikeExchange, with five riders, were the only team to not compete with the maximum allowed of seven riders. Of the 173 riders who were entered into the race, there were 158 finishers and three non-starters.

UCI WorldTeams

- AG2R Citroën Team
- Astana–Premier Tech
- Bora–Hansgrohe
- Cofidis
- Deceuninck–Quick-Step
- Groupama–FDJ
- Intermarché–Wanty–Gobert Matériaux
- Israel Start-Up Nation
- Lotto–Soudal
- Movistar Team
- Team Bahrain Victorious
- Team BikeExchange
- Team DSM
- Team Jumbo–Visma
- Team Qhubeka Assos
- Trek–Segafredo
- UAE Team Emirates

UCI ProTeams

- Alpecin–Fenix
- Arkéa–Samsic
- B&B Hotels p/b KTM
- Bingoal WB
- Sport Vlaanderen–Baloise
- Total Direct Énergie
- Uno-X Pro Cycling Team
- Vini Zabù

== Result ==
Result
Rank	Rider	Team	Time
1	Sam Bennett (IRL)	Deceuninck–Quick-Step	4h 27' 40"
2	Jasper Philipsen (BEL)	Alpecin–Fenix	+ 0"
3	Pascal Ackermann (GER)	Bora–Hansgrohe	+ 0"
4	Giacomo Nizzolo (ITA)	Team Qhubeka Assos	+ 0"
5	Timothy Dupont (BEL)	Bingoal WB	+ 0"
6	Hugo Hofstetter (FRA)	Israel Start-Up Nation	+ 0"
7	Cees Bol (NED)	Team DSM	+ 0"
8	Michael Mørkøv (DEN)	Deceuninck–Quick-Step	+ 0"
9	Elia Viviani (ITA)	Cofidis	+ 0"
10	Stanisław Aniołkowski (POL)	Bingoal WB	+ 0"
