= 2020 Tour de France, Stage 1 to Stage 11 =

Cycling race results

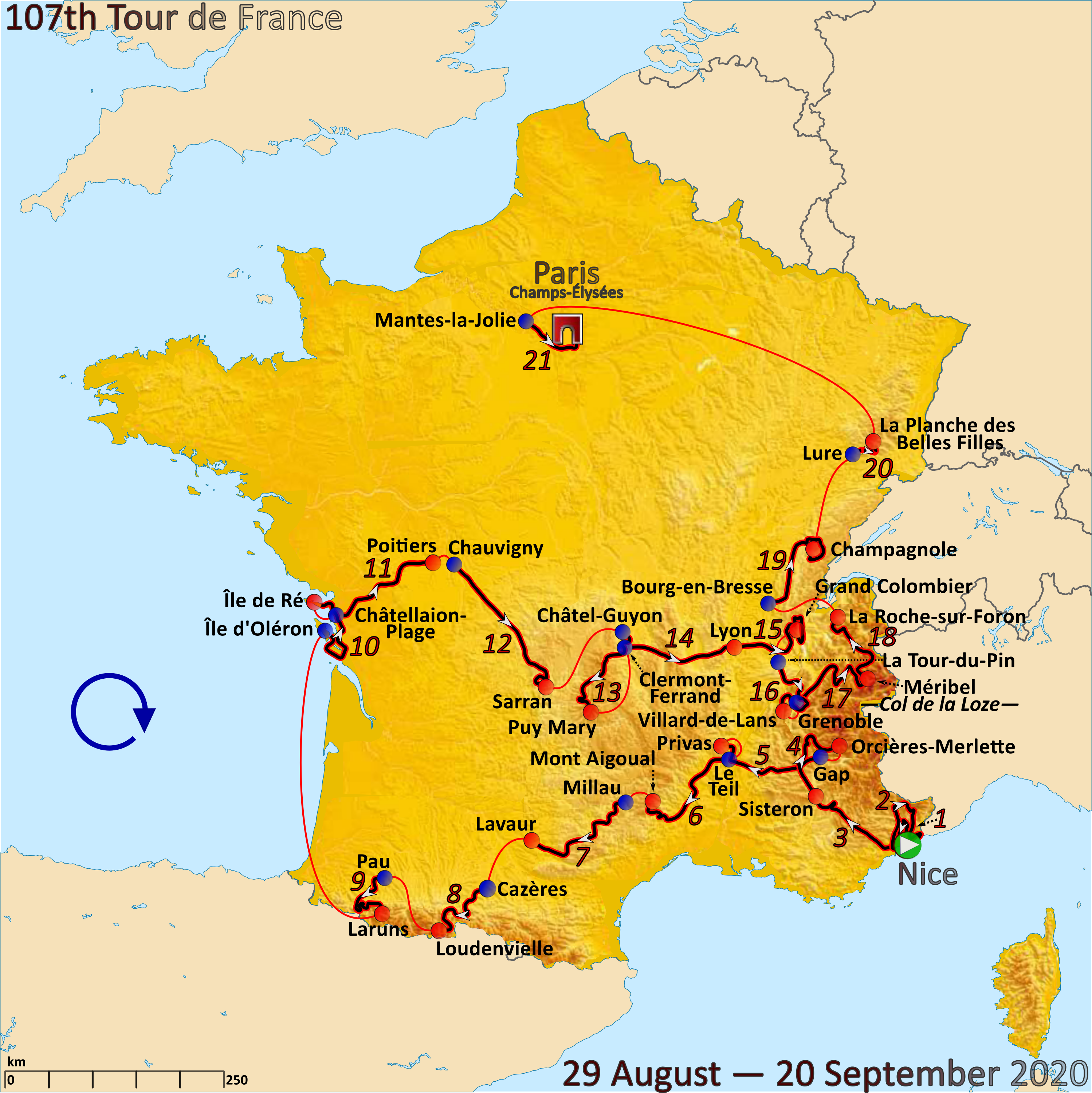
Route of the 2020 Tour de France

The 2020 Tour de France was the 107th edition of the Tour de France, one of cycling's Grand Tours. The Tour began in Nice with a hilly stage on 29 August, and Stage 11 occurred on 9 September with a flat stage to Poitiers. The race finished on the Champs-Élysées in Paris on 20 September.

== Classification standings ==
Legend
A yellow jersey.	Denotes the leader of the general classification	A white jersey with red polka dots.	Denotes the leader of the mountains classification
A green jersey.	Denotes the leader of the points classification	A white jersey.	Denotes the leader of the young rider classification
A white jersey with a yellow number bib.	Denotes the leader of the team classification	A white jersey with a red number bib.	Denotes the winner of the combativity award

== Stage 1 ==
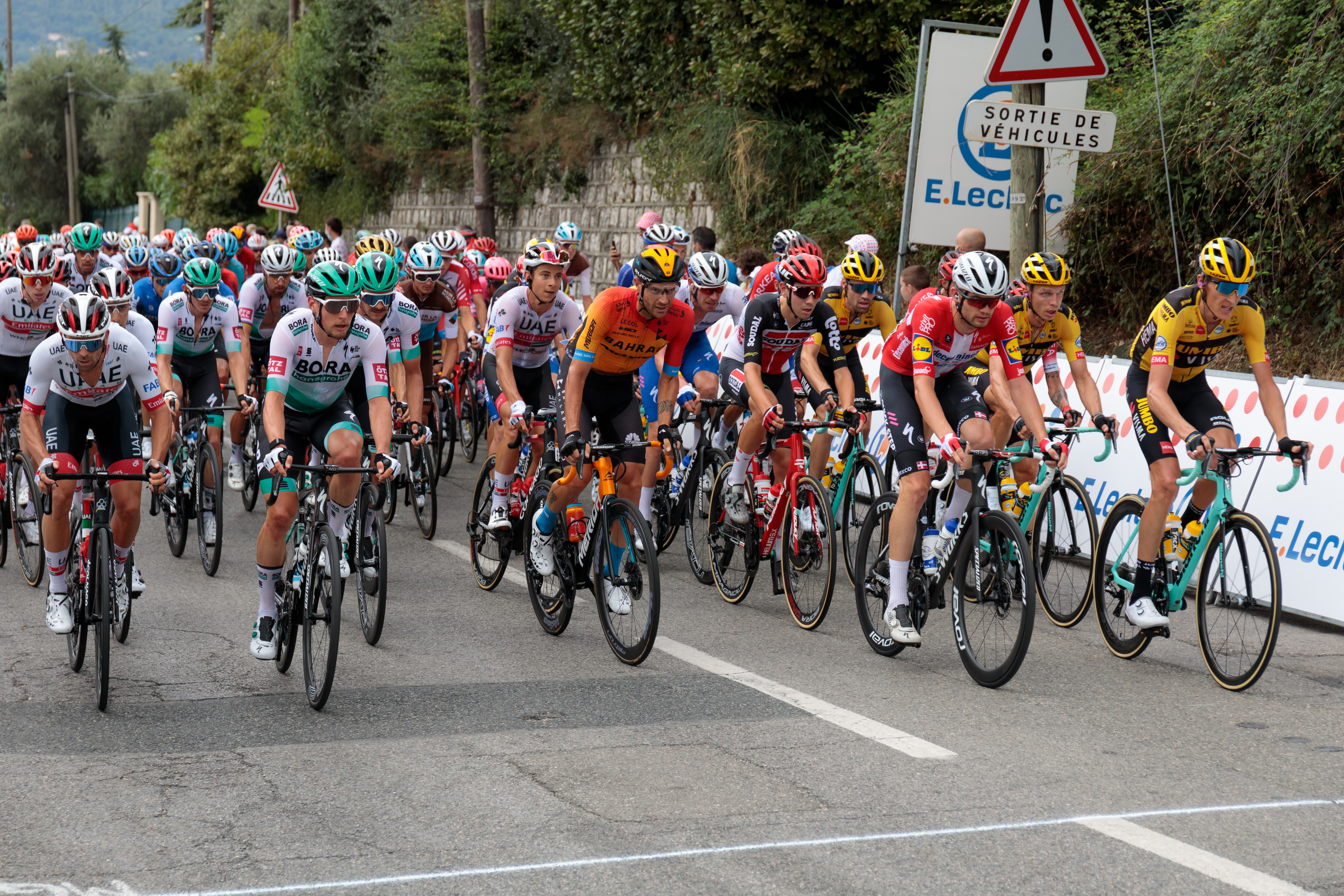
The peloton on the col de Rimiez

29 August 2020 – Nice to Nice, 156 km (97 mi)

The main break of the day was made by Cyril Gautier (B&B Hotels–Vital Concept), Michael Schär (CCC Team), and Fabien Grellier (Total Direct Énergie), who split the six mountain points on offer evenly between themselves; Grellier was awarded the King of the Mountains jersey by virtue of having scored his two points first. The break was caught with 100 kilometers still to go, after which it started to rain. This made the downhill portions of the stage very slippery and caused several crashes, with Pavel Sivakov and Miguel Ángel López among those to fall. Eventually, the riders, led by Tony Martin, agreed a truce in the peloton. On the riders returned to the flat roads in the run-in to the finish, a late breakaway attempt by Benoît Cosnefroy with around 20 kilometers left was short-lived. A large pileup occurred with 3 kilometers to go, but the riders involved were all credited with the same time as the stage winner as per race regulations. In the final sprint, Alexander Kristoff won, narrowly holding off the fast-approaching defending World Road Race Champion Mads Pedersen, to take the first yellow jersey of the race. As a result of the crashes, Bahrain–McLaren's Rafael Valls and Lotto–Soudal duo John Degenkolb and Philippe Gilbert withdrew from the race, while several other riders, notably Sivakov, were left severely injured.

Stage 1 Result
Rank	Rider	Team	Time
1	Alexander Kristoff (NOR)	UAE Team Emirates	3h 46' 23"
2	Mads Pedersen (DEN)	Trek–Segafredo	+ 0"
3	Cees Bol (NED)	Team Sunweb	+ 0"
4	Sam Bennett (IRL)	Deceuninck–Quick-Step	+ 0"
5	Peter Sagan (SVK)	Bora–Hansgrohe	+ 0"
6	Elia Viviani (ITA)	Cofidis	+ 0"
7	Giacomo Nizzolo (ITA)	NTT Pro Cycling	+ 0"
8	Bryan Coquard (FRA)	B&B Hotels–Vital Concept	+ 0"
9	Anthony Turgis (FRA)	Total Direct Énergie	+ 0"
10	Jasper Stuyven (BEL)	Trek–Segafredo	+ 0"

General classification after Stage 1
Rank	Rider	Team	Time
1	Alexander Kristoff (NOR)	UAE Team Emirates	3h 46' 13"
2	Mads Pedersen (DEN)	Trek–Segafredo	+ 4"
3	Cees Bol (NED)	Team Sunweb	+ 6"
4	Sam Bennett (IRL)	Deceuninck–Quick-Step	+ 10"
5	Peter Sagan (SVK)	Bora–Hansgrohe	+ 10"
6	Elia Viviani (ITA)	Cofidis	+ 10"
7	Giacomo Nizzolo (ITA)	NTT Pro Cycling	+ 10"
8	Bryan Coquard (FRA)	B&B Hotels–Vital Concept	+ 10"
9	Anthony Turgis (FRA)	Total Direct Énergie	+ 10"
10	Jasper Stuyven (BEL)	Trek–Segafredo	+ 10"

== Stage 2 ==
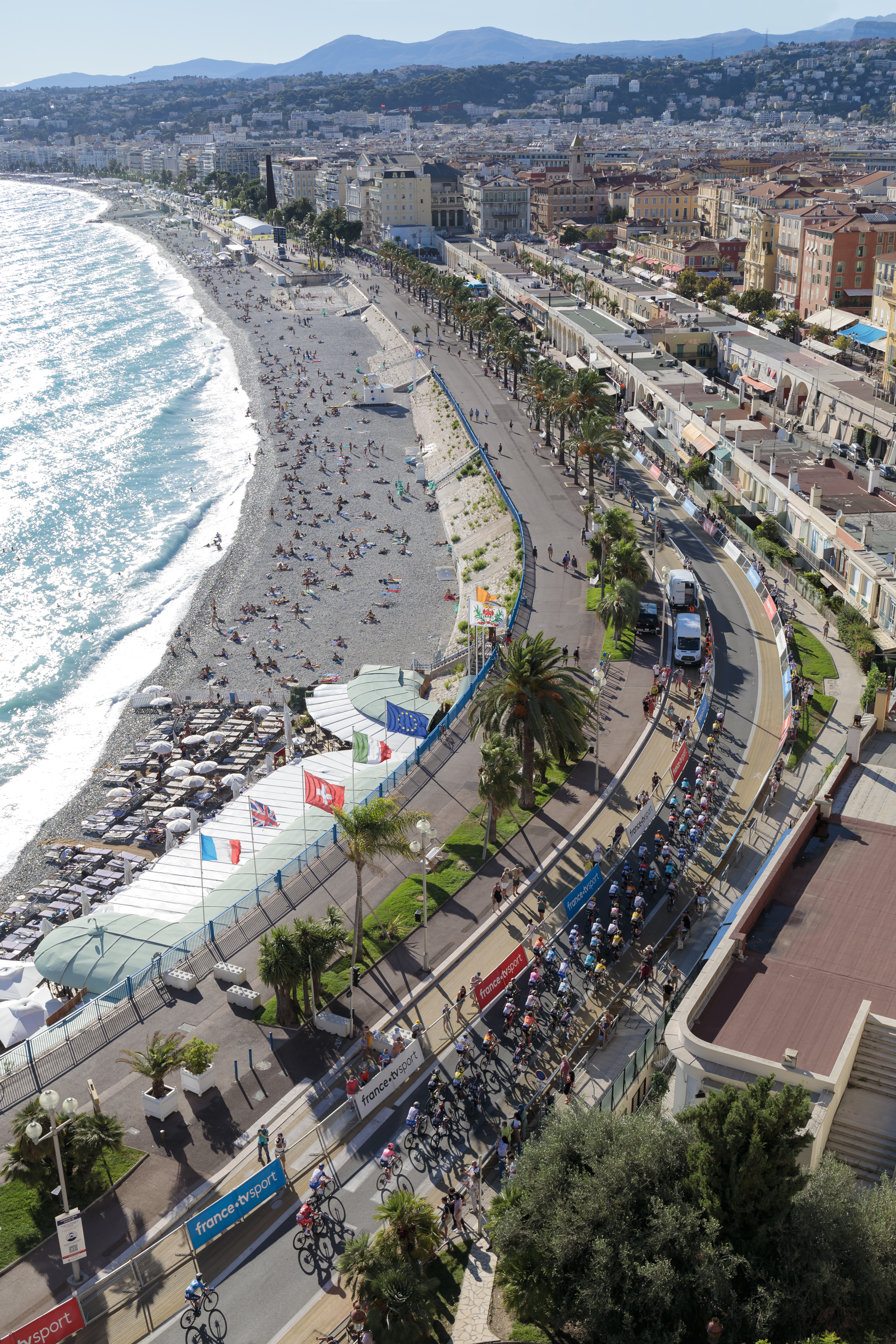
The peloton in Nice

30 August 2020 – Nice to Nice, 186 km (116 mi)

Stage 2 was a noticeably sunnier affair compared to the wet and dreary conditions on stage 1. The early break consisted of seven riders: Benoît Cosnefroy (AG2R La Mondiale), Lukas Pöstlberger and Peter Sagan (Bora–Hansgrohe), Matteo Trentin (CCC Team), Anthony Perez (Cofidis), Kasper Asgreen (Deceuninck–Quick-Step), and Toms Skujiņš (Trek–Segafredo). Sagan began his points classification title defense as he tried to go for a record eighth green jersey, but he was pipped at the intermediate sprint by Trentin. Cosnefroy and Perez scored 18 points across each of the two category 1 climbs, and Cosnefroy was awarded the polka dot jersey on tiebreakers. With around 40 kilometers left, the rest of the breakaway were caught by the peloton. On the final climb, the Col des Quatre Chemins, Julian Alaphilippe, Marc Hirschi and Adam Yates made a late break and maintained a narrow lead over the peloton to the finish, where Alaphilippe took the sprint and claimed the yellow jersey. Alexander Kristoff was dropped early on in the stage and finished over 28 minutes behind Alaphilippe, but the Norwegian was able to keep the green jersey.

Stage 2 Result
Rank	Rider	Team	Time
1	Julian Alaphilippe (FRA)	Deceuninck–Quick-Step	4h 55' 27"
2	Marc Hirschi (SUI)	Team Sunweb	+ 0"
3	Adam Yates (GBR)	Mitchelton–Scott	+ 1"
4	Greg Van Avermaet (BEL)	CCC Team	+ 2"
5	Sergio Higuita (COL)	EF Pro Cycling	+ 2"
6	Bauke Mollema (NED)	Trek–Segafredo	+ 2"
7	Alexey Lutsenko (KAZ)	Astana	+ 2"
8	Tadej Pogačar (SLO)	UAE Team Emirates	+ 2"
9	Maximilian Schachmann (GER)	Bora–Hansgrohe	+ 2"
10	Alberto Bettiol (ITA)	EF Pro Cycling	+ 2"

General classification after Stage 2
Rank	Rider	Team	Time
1	Julian Alaphilippe (FRA)	Deceuninck–Quick-Step	8h 41' 35"
2	Adam Yates (GBR)	Mitchelton–Scott	+ 4"
3	Marc Hirschi (SUI)	Team Sunweb	+ 7"
4	Sergio Higuita (COL)	EF Pro Cycling	+ 17"
5	Tadej Pogačar (SLO)	UAE Team Emirates	+ 17"
6	Esteban Chaves (COL)	Mitchelton–Scott	+ 17"
7	Davide Formolo (ITA)	UAE Team Emirates	+ 17"
8	Egan Bernal (COL)	INEOS Grenadiers	+ 17"
9	Richard Carapaz (ECU)	INEOS Grenadiers	+ 17"
10	Tom Dumoulin (NED)	Team Jumbo–Visma	+ 17"

== Stage 3 ==
31 August 2020 – Nice to Sisteron, 198 km (123 mi)

As the race headed out of Nice, a trio of French riders formed the main breakaway of the day: Benoît Cosnefroy (AG2R La Mondiale), Anthony Perez (Cofidis), and Jérôme Cousin (Total Direct Énergie). Cosnefroy and Perez were tied on points in the mountains classification, though the former wore the polka-dot jersey on tiebreakers, and they wrestled for points across the early pair of category 3 climbs. Perez managed to outsprint Cosnefroy on both of those climbs, putting the former into the virtual mountains classification lead. Shortly thereafter, they both rejoined the peloton while Cousin soldiered on alone. On the next climb, the category 3 Col des Leques, Cousin crossed over first and two points, while in the peloton behind, Cosnefroy managed to outsprint Perez to take the solitary point left over. It was reported that Perez crashed on the descent of the Col des Leques with around 70 kilometers to go and had to abandon the race, meaning that Cosnefroy kept hold of the polka-dot jersey. At the sole intermediate sprint of the day at Digne-les-Bains, Cousin crossed over first, while the sprinters behind raced for the remaining points, with Peter Sagan being the best of the rest. Cousin was finally caught with 16 kilometers to go; for his efforts, he was given the stage's most combative rider award. In the final kilometer, Team Sunweb took to the front to try and lead out Cees Bol. Sagan and then Sam Bennett led the sprint, but Caleb Ewan, coming from some distance back, weaved through the throng of sprinters and overhauled the Irishman on the finish line. With his fifth place result, Sagan took the green jersey.

Stage 3 Result
Rank	Rider	Team	Time
1	Caleb Ewan (AUS)	Lotto–Soudal	5h 17' 42"
2	Sam Bennett (IRL)	Deceuninck–Quick-Step	+ 0"
3	Giacomo Nizzolo (ITA)	NTT Pro Cycling	+ 0"
4	Hugo Hofstetter (FRA)	Israel Start-Up Nation	+ 0"
5	Peter Sagan (SVK)	Bora–Hansgrohe	+ 0"
6	Edward Theuns (BEL)	Trek–Segafredo	+ 0"
7	Cees Bol (NED)	Team Sunweb	+ 0"
8	Matteo Trentin (ITA)	CCC Team	+ 0"
9	Bryan Coquard (FRA)	B&B Hotels–Vital Concept	+ 0"
10	Niccolò Bonifazio (ITA)	Total Direct Énergie	+ 0"

General classification after Stage 3
Rank	Rider	Team	Time
1	Julian Alaphilippe (FRA)	Deceuninck–Quick-Step	13h 59' 17"
2	Adam Yates (GBR)	Mitchelton–Scott	+ 4"
3	Marc Hirschi (SUI)	Team Sunweb	+ 7"
4	Tadej Pogačar (SLO)	UAE Team Emirates	+ 17"
5	Davide Formolo (ITA)	UAE Team Emirates	+ 17"
6	Egan Bernal (COL)	INEOS Grenadiers	+ 17"
7	Tom Dumoulin (NED)	Team Jumbo–Visma	+ 17"
8	Sergio Higuita (COL)	EF Pro Cycling	+ 17"
9	Guillaume Martin (FRA)	Cofidis	+ 17"
10	Esteban Chaves (COL)	Mitchelton–Scott	+ 17"

== Stage 4 ==
1 September 2020 – Sisteron to Orcières-Merlette, 160.5 km (99.7 mi)

The Tour de France made an early foray into the high mountains with a summit finish at the Orcières-Merlette ski resort. Right from the start, Alexis Vuillermoz (AG2R La Mondiale), Quentin Pacher (B&B Hotels–Vital Concept), Krists Neilands and Nils Politt (Israel Start-Up Nation), Tiesj Benoot (Team Sunweb), and Mathieu Burgaudeau (Total Direct Énergie) formed the day's breakaway. Politt was first at the intermediate sprint, while Sam Bennett won the sprint from the peloton as the sprinters scrambled for the remaining points. Pacher won most of the mountain points across the first few climbs, accumulating six. With around 35 kilometers remaining, on the descent of the Côte de l'Aullagnier, Benoot went wide around a bend and crashed over a barrier, though he was relatively unscathed and was able to continue. Near the top of the penultimate climb, Côte de Saint-Léger-les-Mélèzes, Neilands accelerated away from his fellow breakaway companions, with Pacher and Vuillermoz giving chase. The Latvian was finally caught by the peloton with seven kilometers left and was awarded the stage's combativity award for his efforts. Pierre Rolland tried to attack from the peloton, but his time out in front lasted only a kilometer before he was reeled back in. In the final two kilometers, Sepp Kuss set a fierce tempo for his team leader Primož Roglič. Guillaume Martin initiated the sprint but Roglič chased him down and won the stage. Race leader Julian Alaphilippe finished fifth to maintain his lead in the general classification.

Stage 4 Result
Rank	Rider	Team	Time
1	Primož Roglič (SLO)	Team Jumbo–Visma	4h 07' 47"
2	Tadej Pogačar (SLO)	UAE Team Emirates	+ 0"
3	Guillaume Martin (FRA)	Cofidis	+ 0"
4	Nairo Quintana (COL)	Arkéa–Samsic	+ 0"
5	Julian Alaphilippe (FRA)	Deceuninck–Quick-Step	+ 0"
6	Miguel Ángel López (COL)	Astana	+ 0"
7	Egan Bernal (COL)	INEOS Grenadiers	+ 0"
8	Thibaut Pinot (FRA)	Groupama–FDJ	+ 0"
9	Mikel Landa (ESP)	Bahrain–McLaren	+ 0"
10	Adam Yates (GBR)	Mitchelton–Scott	+ 0"

General classification after Stage 4
Rank	Rider	Team	Time
1	Julian Alaphilippe (FRA)	Deceuninck–Quick-Step	18h 07' 04"
2	Adam Yates (GBR)	Mitchelton–Scott	+ 4"
3	Primož Roglič (SLO)	Team Jumbo–Visma	+ 7"
4	Tadej Pogačar (SLO)	UAE Team Emirates	+ 11"
5	Guillaume Martin (FRA)	Cofidis	+ 13"
6	Egan Bernal (COL)	INEOS Grenadiers	+ 17"
7	Tom Dumoulin (NED)	Team Jumbo–Visma	+ 17"
8	Esteban Chaves (COL)	Mitchelton–Scott	+ 17"
9	Nairo Quintana (COL)	Arkéa–Samsic	+ 17"
10	Miguel Ángel López (COL)	Astana	+ 17"

== Stage 5 ==
2 September 2020 – Gap to Privas, 183 km (114 mi)

Despite the moderate pace of the peloton, there were no noticeable breakaway attempts on the mostly downhill stage, as the riders feared the threat of crosswinds and were happy to take it easy after four hard stages to start the Tour. At the intermediate sprint, Sam Bennett took maximum points while points classification leader Peter Sagan could only manage fourth behind Bennett's teammate Michael Mørkøv and Caleb Ewan. Polka-dot jersey wearer Benoît Cosnefroy took both of the singular mountain points available on the two category 4 climbs unchallenged to extend his lead in the mountains classification. With under ten kilometers left, INEOS Grenadiers took to the front and ramped up the pace, stringing out the peloton and causing splits. Like in stage 3, Team Sunweb took to the front in the final two kilometers to try and set up Cees Bol for the slightly uphill sprint finish. However, Wout van Aert, who had been sitting on Bol's wheel, came out of the Dutch rider's slipstream and powered away for his first Grand Tour stage win. As a result of finishing ahead of Sagan in both the intermediate sprint and the final sprint, Bennett gained enough points to take over the green jersey. After the stage, race officials handed race leader Julian Alaphilippe a 20-second penalty for taking an illegal feed with less than 20 kilometers to go. As a result, he dropped out of the top ten and Adam Yates took the yellow jersey.

Stage 5 Result
Rank	Rider	Team	Time
1	Wout van Aert (BEL)	Team Jumbo–Visma	4h 21' 22"
2	Cees Bol (NED)	Team Sunweb	+ 0"
3	Sam Bennett (IRL)	Deceuninck–Quick-Step	+ 0"
4	Peter Sagan (SVK)	Bora–Hansgrohe	+ 0"
5	Jasper Stuyven (BEL)	Trek–Segafredo	+ 0"
6	Luka Mezgec (SLO)	Mitchelton–Scott	+ 0"
7	Bryan Coquard (FRA)	B&B Hotels–Vital Concept	+ 0"
8	Caleb Ewan (AUS)	Lotto–Soudal	+ 0"
9	Clément Venturini (FRA)	AG2R La Mondiale	+ 0"
10	Hugo Hofstetter (FRA)	Israel Start-Up Nation	+ 0"

General classification after Stage 5
Rank	Rider	Team	Time
1	Adam Yates (GBR)	Mitchelton–Scott	22h 28' 30"
2	Primož Roglič (SLO)	Team Jumbo–Visma	+ 3"
3	Tadej Pogačar (SLO)	UAE Team Emirates	+ 7"
4	Guillaume Martin (FRA)	Cofidis	+ 9"
5	Egan Bernal (COL)	INEOS Grenadiers	+ 13"
6	Tom Dumoulin (NED)	Team Jumbo–Visma	+ 13"
7	Nairo Quintana (COL)	Arkéa–Samsic	+ 13"
8	Esteban Chaves (COL)	Mitchelton–Scott	+ 13"
9	Miguel Ángel López (COL)	Astana	+ 13"
10	Romain Bardet (FRA)	AG2R La Mondiale	+ 13"

== Stage 6 ==
3 September 2020 – Le Teil to Mont Aigoual, 191 km (119 mi)

The peloton were content to let the breakaway decide the stage, which was mostly flat for the first 155 kilometers before offering up a series of climbs in quick succession culminating in a summit finish atop Mont Aigoual. Eight riders formed the day's breakaway: Alexey Lutsenko (Astana), Daniel Oss (Bora–Hansgrohe), Greg Van Avermaet (CCC Team), Jesús Herrada (Cofidis), Rémi Cavagna (Deceuninck–Quick-Step), Neilson Powless (EF Pro Cycling), Edvald Boasson Hagen (NTT Pro Cycling), and Nicolas Roche (Team Sunweb). The octet reached a maximum advantage of over six minutes before the peloton began to slowly close the gap. Boasson Hagen won the intermediate sprint just ahead of Oss while the rest of the breakaway rolled through. Roger Kluge, one of Caleb Ewan's lead-out men, rolled off the front of the peloton and through the intermediate sprint, leaving only six on offer for the next rider, who was green jersey wearer Sam Bennett; Ewan himself did not seriously contest the intermediate sprint and came away with no points gained. Neither of the category 3 climbs were seriously challenged for by the breakaway, though Roche rode across first both times.

On the lower slopes of the Col de la Lusette, Cavagna accelerated, dropping Boasson Hagen and Oss. Shortly after, Powless put in an attack, with Cavagna the next to be dropped. Powless put in another surge, hoping to win on his 24th birthday, attacked again, with only Lutsenko being able to follow. Eventually, the efforts took a toll on Powless, as he was unable to keep up with Lutsenko. The Kazakh road champion managed to maintain and even extend his lead over the top of the Col de la Lusette and up Mont Aigoual for the stage win. Herrada managed to claw his way back into second place, nearly a minute behind Lutsenko, while Van Avermaet outsprinted Powless for third. The main favorites finished almost three minutes down on Lutsenko, with Julian Alaphilippe sprinting away towards the end to try and claw back the time he lost due to the penalty he incurred on the previous stage, but the Frenchman was closely followed and only managed to gain back one second.

Stage 6 Result
Rank	Rider	Team	Time
1	Alexey Lutsenko (KAZ)	Astana	4h 32' 34"
2	Jesús Herrada (ESP)	Cofidis	+ 55"
3	Greg Van Avermaet (BEL)	CCC Team	+ 2' 15"
4	Neilson Powless (USA)	EF Pro Cycling	+ 2' 17"
5	Julian Alaphilippe (FRA)	Deceuninck–Quick-Step	+ 2' 52"
6	Bauke Mollema (NED)	Trek–Segafredo	+ 2' 53"
7	Michał Kwiatkowski (POL)	INEOS Grenadiers	+ 2' 53"
8	Egan Bernal (COL)	INEOS Grenadiers	+ 2' 53"
9	Richard Carapaz (ECU)	INEOS Grenadiers	+ 2' 53"
10	Adam Yates (GBR)	Mitchelton–Scott	+ 2' 53"

General classification after Stage 6
Rank	Rider	Team	Time
1	Adam Yates (GBR)	Mitchelton–Scott	27h 03' 57"
2	Primož Roglič (SLO)	Team Jumbo–Visma	+ 3"
3	Tadej Pogačar (SLO)	UAE Team Emirates	+ 7"
4	Guillaume Martin (FRA)	Cofidis	+ 9"
5	Egan Bernal (COL)	INEOS Grenadiers	+ 13"
6	Tom Dumoulin (NED)	Team Jumbo–Visma	+ 13"
7	Esteban Chaves (COL)	Mitchelton–Scott	+ 13"
8	Nairo Quintana (COL)	Arkéa–Samsic	+ 13"
9	Romain Bardet (FRA)	AG2R La Mondiale	+ 13"
10	Miguel Ángel López (COL)	Astana	+ 13"

== Stage 7 ==
4 September 2020 – Millau to Lavaur, 168 km (104 mi)

Benoît Cosnefroy jumped out of the peloton early on to claim the maximum points on offer in the mountains classification at the Côte de Luzençon less than ten kilometers into the stage. Behind him, Bora–Hansgrohe took to the front and began to set a fast pace, inadvertently catching Cosnefroy shortly before the summit and forcing the mountains classification leader to put in a second acceleration to earn his points. At the same time, the fast pace caused many sprinters to be dropped, including Caleb Ewan, Elia Viviani, Cees Bol, Giacomo Nizzolo, Alexander Kristoff, and points classification leader Sam Bennett, much to the benefit of Bora–Hansgrohe sprinter Peter Sagan, who sought to reclaim the green jersey. At the intermediate sprint, Matteo Trentin just managed to hold off Sagan on the line. After the Col de Peyronnenc, Thomas de Gendt made a solo breakaway effort, but he never managed to get an advantage of one minute over the peloton, who reeled him in with under 35 kilometers to go. At the same time, INEOS Grenadiers upped the pace and the remaining peloton further split into several groups. Among the general classification contenders who caught out were Tadej Pogačar, Mikel Landa, Richard Carapaz, and the Trek–Segafredo duo of Bauke Mollema and Richie Porte. In the ensuing bunch sprint, Wout van Aert powered through along the barriers to take his second stage win in three days. Pogačar led home the second group, which finished nearly a minute and a half behind the front group, while the dropped sprinters would eventually roll across the line over 14 minutes in arrears. As a result of the intermediate sprint points and his 13th place finish, Sagan took back the green jersey from Bennett.

Stage 7 Result
Rank	Rider	Team	Time
1	Wout van Aert (BEL)	Team Jumbo–Visma	3h 32' 03"
2	Edvald Boasson Hagen (NOR)	NTT Pro Cycling	+ 0"
3	Bryan Coquard (FRA)	B&B Hotels–Vital Concept	+ 0"
4	Christophe Laporte (FRA)	Cofidis	+ 0"
5	Jasper Stuyven (BEL)	Trek–Segafredo	+ 0"
6	Clément Venturini (FRA)	AG2R La Mondiale	+ 0"
7	Hugo Hofstetter (FRA)	Israel Start-Up Nation	+ 0"
8	Egan Bernal (COL)	INEOS Grenadiers	+ 0"
9	Adam Yates (GBR)	Mitchelton–Scott	+ 0"
10	Alejandro Valverde (ESP)	Movistar Team	+ 0"

General classification after Stage 7
Rank	Rider	Team	Time
1	Adam Yates (GBR)	Mitchelton–Scott	30h 36' 00"
2	Primož Roglič (SLO)	Team Jumbo–Visma	+ 3"
3	Guillaume Martin (FRA)	Cofidis	+ 9"
4	Egan Bernal (COL)	INEOS Grenadiers	+ 13"
5	Tom Dumoulin (NED)	Team Jumbo–Visma	+ 13"
6	Nairo Quintana (COL)	Arkéa–Samsic	+ 13"
7	Romain Bardet (FRA)	AG2R La Mondiale	+ 13"
8	Miguel Ángel López (COL)	Astana	+ 13"
9	Thibaut Pinot (FRA)	Groupama–FDJ	+ 13"
10	Rigoberto Urán (COL)	EF Pro Cycling	+ 13"

== Stage 8 ==
5 September 2020 – Cazères to Loudenvielle, 141 km (88 mi)

Thirteen riders formed the day's breakaway: Benoît Cosnefroy and Nans Peters (AG2R La Mondiale), Quentin Pacher and Kévin Reza (B&B Hotels–Vital Concept), Ilnur Zakarin (CCC Team), Michael Mørkøv (Deceuninck–Quick-Step), Neilson Powless (EF Pro Cycling), Ben Hermans (Israel Start-Up Nation), Carlos Verona (Movistar Team), Søren Kragh Andersen (Team Sunweb), Jérôme Cousin and Fabien Grellier (Total Direct Énergie), and Toms Skujiņš (Trek–Segafredo). None of them were placed highly in the general classification, with best-placed Zakarin being over 16 minutes behind Adam Yates, so the peloton allowed them to race for the stage win; at one point, the breakaway was over 14 minutes ahead. Cousin won the intermediate sprint at Sengouagnet relatively uncontested, as Mørkøv led the rest of the uninterested breakaway across. Because intermediate sprints offered points up to the 15th rider to cross, and there had only been 13 so far from the breakaway, some of the sprinters in the peloton decided to duke it out for the last minor points, with Sam Bennett and Bryan Coquard taking them. With around 80 kilometers left, Italian and European road race champion Giacomo Nizzolo was forced to abandon the race, having struggled with a knee injury. At the first category 1 climb, the Col de Menté, Cosnefroy took the maximum ten points on offer to extend his lead in the mountain classification. On the lower slopes of the Port de Balès, a Hors catégorie climb, Cousin broke away. Later on up the climb, shortly after the breakaway caught Cousin, Peters accelerated, with only Zakarin and Pacher able to follow. Pacher did not manage to keep pace for long, and Peters led Zakarin over the summit. Behind them, Pacher continued on, followed shortly after by the quartet of Kragh Andersen, Powless, Skujiņš, and Verona.

It was on the descent where the lead duo would be separated, as Peters clearly was more skilled at descending, managing to gain a lead of 30 seconds on Zakarin by the end of the descent. Although Zakarin slowly closed the gap to Peters on the last climb, the Col de Peyresourde, Peters still managed to summit it alone before extending his lead again on that descent. Behind the remnants of the breakaway, the GC contenders began to test each other on the Peyresourde, as Team Jumbo–Visma set a fast pace. Julian Alaphilippe made an initial attack, but after just one acceleration, the Frenchman bonked and was quickly passed by other riders. Eventually, Tadej Pogačar went clear, pulling with him compatriot Primož Roglič, while Yates struggled to keep up with the group. After a regrouping, Pogačar attacked again and was able to break away on his own. With Yates slowly bridging his way back up to the group, Roglič and Nairo Quintana attacked over the top of the summit.

Peters managed to hang on to his lead and win his first Grand Tour stage win. Zakarin had also been passed by Skujiņš and Verona on the run-in to the finish, with Skujiņš beating Verona in the sprint for second place. In ones and twos, the surviving breakaway riders managed to finish ahead of Pogačar, who had built up a lead of 38 seconds over the nearest group of his rivals, including Roglič, Quintana, and Yates, who retained the leader's yellow jersey. The advantage saw Pogačar re-enter the top ten as he recouped about a third of the time he had lost on the previous stage. On the other hand, several GC contenders lost time: Richard Carapaz, Enric Mas, and Bauke Mollema finished a further 38 seconds behind Pogačar, while Tom Dumoulin, Sergio Higuita, and Alejandro Valverde lost over two minutes. Alaphilippe eventually crossed the finish line over 11 minutes after Pogačar did. GC contender Thibaut Pinot, who had been suffering from back pain and had been dropped from the peloton on the Port de Balès, was shepherded across the finish line by his teammates nearly 19 minutes behind the main group of GC contenders, effectively ending his chances of an overall victory.

Stage 8 Result
Rank	Rider	Team	Time
1	Nans Peters (FRA)	AG2R La Mondiale	4h 02' 12"
2	Toms Skujiņš (LAT)	Trek–Segafredo	+ 47"
3	Carlos Verona (ESP)	Movistar Team	+ 47"
4	Ilnur Zakarin (RUS)	CCC Team	+ 1' 09"
5	Neilson Powless (USA)	EF Pro Cycling	+ 1' 41"
6	Ben Hermans (BEL)	Israel Start-Up Nation	+ 3' 42"
7	Quentin Pacher (FRA)	B&B Hotels–Vital Concept	+ 3' 42"
8	Søren Kragh Andersen (DEN)	Team Sunweb	+ 4' 04"
9	Tadej Pogačar (SLO)	UAE Team Emirates	+ 6' 00"
10	Romain Bardet (FRA)	AG2R La Mondiale	+ 6' 38"

General classification after Stage 8
Rank	Rider	Team	Time
1	Adam Yates (GBR)	Mitchelton–Scott	34h 44' 52"
2	Primož Roglič (SLO)	Team Jumbo–Visma	+ 3"
3	Guillaume Martin (FRA)	Cofidis	+ 9"
4	Romain Bardet (FRA)	AG2R La Mondiale	+ 11"
5	Egan Bernal (COL)	INEOS Grenadiers	+ 13"
6	Nairo Quintana (COL)	Arkéa–Samsic	+ 13"
7	Miguel Ángel López (COL)	Astana	+ 13"
8	Rigoberto Urán (COL)	EF Pro Cycling	+ 13"
9	Tadej Pogačar (SLO)	UAE Team Emirates	+ 48"
10	Enric Mas (ESP)	Movistar Team	+ 1' 00"

== Stage 9 ==
6 September 2020 – Pau to Laruns, 153 km (95 mi)

The stage started with multiple breakaway attempts, including from Tiesj Benoot (Team Sunweb) and Hugh Carthy (EF Pro Cycling), but the fast pace set by INEOS Grenadiers and Team Jumbo–Visma prevented any breakaways from forming successfully. On the Col de la Hourcère, the peloton began to fracture, while at the front of the race, Lennard Kämna (Bora–Hansgrohe) and Marc Hirschi (Team Sunweb) made further breakaway attempts. The latter managed to make it stick, riding away from the peloton with 87 kilometers left, while back problems continued to hamper Thibaut Pinot, who was dropped again. By the time Hirschi reached the summit and took the maximum mountain points on offer, the weather began to have an effect on the stage, making for a foggy descent. More importantly, he was nearly two minutes ahead of an eight-man chasing group that included Kämna, Daniel Martínez, and Sébastien Reichenbach, and nearly three minutes ahead of the Team Jumbo–Visma-led peloton at that point.

While out in front, Hirschi won the intermediate sprint and took 24 mountain points. With 34.5 kilometers left, Hirschi still maintained a lead of over four minutes, but the peloton slowly began to close the gap on the decisive Col de Marie Blanque. Considering the rest day to follow, the GC contenders were emboldened to be aggressive. With many riders struggling to keep pace, including yellow jersey wearer Adam Yates, the four at the front (Egan Bernal, Mikel Landa, Tadej Pogačar, and Primož Roglič) sought to increase the distance to their rivals. After Hirschi summitted first, this time with an advantage of less than half a minute, there were still bonus seconds at the summit for the next two riders. In the ensuing sprint, Pogačar looked behind him as he neared the top, but as Roglič accelerated around the opposite side and past him, Pogačar made a slight deviation that caused his front wheel to nearly be taken out by Roglič's back wheel.

On the descent, the lead quartet continued to close down on Hirschi's lead, while a group of six other GC contenders began a concerted chase to catch back up. With five kilometers to go, Hirschi still led by 26 seconds, but it was clear that he was running out of steam; two kilometers later, his lead had dwindled to just 12 seconds. Eventually, the catch came with 1.6 kilometers left, and Hirschi jumped onto the back of the group to try and hang on to them. With 225 meters left, the Swiss youngster launched his sprint first from the back of the group, with Pogačar and Roglič in hot pursuit. Evidently, Hirschi's solo breakaway efforts caught up to him, as the two Slovenians came around him just before the line. With Pogačar's stage win, he became the youngest Tour stage winner in 27 years, while Roglič's second place saw him move back into the yellow jersey. The chase group, made up of Romain Bardet, Guillaume Martin, Bauke Mollema, Richie Porte, Nairo Quintana, and Rigoberto Urán, managed to cut their losses and finish eleven seconds behind. GC leader Adam Yates finished in a group almost a minute behind Pogačar and dropped to eighth.

Stage 9 Result
Rank	Rider	Team	Time
1	Tadej Pogačar (SLO)	UAE Team Emirates	3h 55' 17"
2	Primož Roglič (SLO)	Team Jumbo–Visma	+ 0"
3	Marc Hirschi (SUI)	Team Sunweb	+ 0"
4	Egan Bernal (COL)	INEOS Grenadiers	+ 0"
5	Mikel Landa (ESP)	Bahrain–McLaren	+ 0"
6	Bauke Mollema (NED)	Trek–Segafredo	+ 11"
7	Guillaume Martin (FRA)	Cofidis	+ 11"
8	Romain Bardet (FRA)	AG2R La Mondiale	+ 11"
9	Richie Porte (AUS)	Trek–Segafredo	+ 11"
10	Rigoberto Urán (COL)	EF Pro Cycling	+ 11"

General classification after Stage 9
Rank	Rider	Team	Time
1	Primož Roglič (SLO)	Team Jumbo–Visma	38h 40' 01"
2	Egan Bernal (COL)	INEOS Grenadiers	+ 21"
3	Guillaume Martin (FRA)	Cofidis	+ 28"
4	Romain Bardet (FRA)	AG2R La Mondiale	+ 30"
5	Nairo Quintana (COL)	Arkéa–Samsic	+ 32"
6	Rigoberto Urán (COL)	EF Pro Cycling	+ 32"
7	Tadej Pogačar (SLO)	UAE Team Emirates	+ 44"
8	Adam Yates (GBR)	Mitchelton–Scott	+ 1' 02"
9	Miguel Ángel López (COL)	Astana	+ 1' 15"
10	Mikel Landa (ESP)	Bahrain–McLaren	+ 1' 42"

== Rest day 1 ==
7 September 2020 – Charente-Maritime

Due to the COVID-19 pandemic, all participants, including riders, staff, and race officials, took COVID-19 tests. Race regulations stipulated that a team would face ejection from the race if they returned at least two positive cases. Though all of the riders tested negative, one staff member each from AG2R La Mondiale, Cofidis, INEOS Grenadiers, and Mitchelton–Scott tested positive, as did race director Christian Prudhomme, who had to quarantine for the next seven days.

== Stage 10 ==
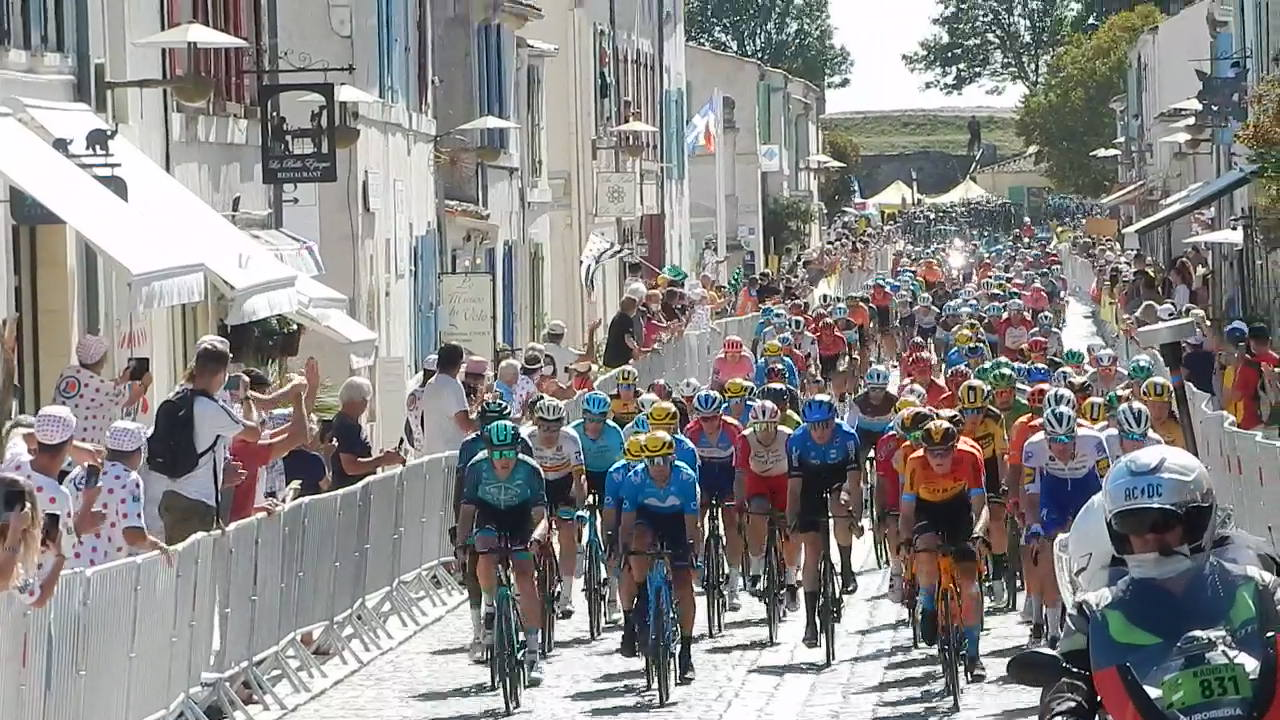
The peloton passing through Marennes-Hiers-Brouage, Charente-Maritime

8 September 2020 – Île d'Oléron to Île de Ré, 168.5 km (104.7 mi)

After the first rest day and a transfer that took the race from the Pyrenees to the Charente-Maritime department on the west coast of France, the peloton took on a windy and almost pan-flat stage near and along the Atlantic coast that was expected to finish in a sprint. Right from the start, as the race crossed over the bridge to the French mainland, the Swiss duo of Stefan Küng (Groupama–FDJ) and Michael Schär (CCC Team) attacked to form the day's breakaway, having agreed to do so in advance. With the sprinters' teams eyeing up the finish, Küng and Schär were kept on a short leash, never having an advantage of more than two minutes.

With just under 100 kilometers to go and the breakaway catch imminent, a crash happened near the back of the peloton, sending several riders into the roadside ditches. Of those riders, two fared the worst: it took several minutes for Nicolas Roche, who lost a bracelet in the crash, to get up and start riding again, while 33-year-old Tour debutant Sam Bewley was forced to abandon after fracturing his wrist. As the peloton went around a roundabout 65 kilometers from the finish, there was another crash. Sprinters Edvald Boasson Hagen and Bryan Coquard were involved, as were GC contenders Guillaume Martin and Tadej Pogačar, but all four riders were able to eventually rejoin the peloton. However, Pogačar's teammate Davide Formolo fractured his clavicle, and though he was able to start riding again, he struggled to finish, coming in over 16 minutes down in last place; he would abandon the race after the stage.

At the intermediate sprint in Châtelaillon-Plage 39 kilometers from the finish, the sprinters battled it out for the points. Once again, Matteo Trentin won, followed by Peter Sagan and Sam Bennett. A split in the peloton occurred with 17 kilometers remaining, but none of the Tour contenders were caught behind the gap. It was Team Sunweb once again who came to the front in the final kilometer for Cees Bol, but their lead-out petered out too soon, leaving Michael Mørkøv on the front to lead out Bennett. The Irishman held off Caleb Ewan on the line to win his first Tour de France stage. Despite green jersey wearer Sagan finishing third, the 50-point haul for first-placed Bennett saw him take over as the leader of points classification.

Stage 10 Result
Rank	Rider	Team	Time
1	Sam Bennett (IRL)	Deceuninck–Quick-Step	3h 35' 22"
2	Caleb Ewan (AUS)	Lotto–Soudal	+ 0"
3	Peter Sagan (SVK)	Bora–Hansgrohe	+ 0"
4	Elia Viviani (ITA)	Cofidis	+ 0"
5	Mads Pedersen (DEN)	Trek–Segafredo	+ 0"
6	André Greipel (GER)	Israel Start-Up Nation	+ 0"
7	Bryan Coquard (FRA)	B&B Hotels–Vital Concept	+ 0"
8	Cees Bol (NED)	Team Sunweb	+ 0"
9	Jasper Stuyven (BEL)	Trek–Segafredo	+ 0"
10	Luka Mezgec (SLO)	Mitchelton–Scott	+ 0"

General classification after Stage 10
Rank	Rider	Team	Time
1	Primož Roglič (SLO)	Team Jumbo–Visma	42h 15' 23"
2	Egan Bernal (COL)	INEOS Grenadiers	+ 21"
3	Guillaume Martin (FRA)	Cofidis	+ 28"
4	Romain Bardet (FRA)	AG2R La Mondiale	+ 30"
5	Nairo Quintana (COL)	Arkéa–Samsic	+ 32"
6	Rigoberto Urán (COL)	EF Pro Cycling	+ 32"
7	Tadej Pogačar (SLO)	UAE Team Emirates	+ 44"
8	Adam Yates (GBR)	Mitchelton–Scott	+ 1' 02"
9	Miguel Ángel López (COL)	Astana	+ 1' 15"
10	Mikel Landa (ESP)	Bahrain–McLaren	+ 1' 42"

== Stage 11 ==
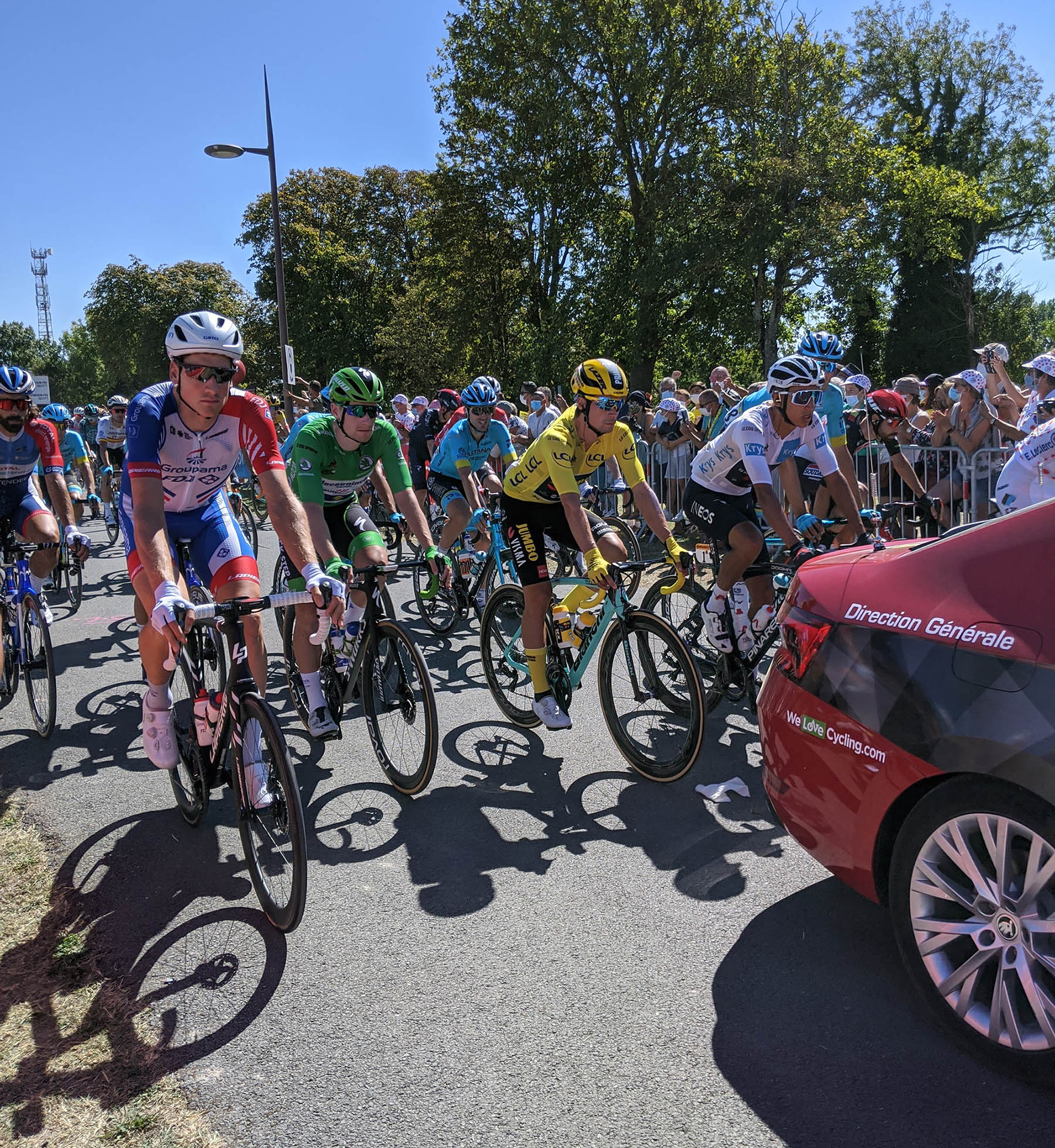
The front of the peloton near the start of stage 11, led by classification leaders Sam Bennett (green), Primož Roglič (yellow), and Egan Bernal (white), with Benoît Cosnefroy (polka dot) just out of frame on the right

9 September 2020 – Châtelaillon-Plage to Poitiers, 167.5 km (104.1 mi)

Stage 11 saw the riders make their way inland and east across central France towards the Alps. The second consecutive nearly pan-flat stage meant a second day in a row for the sprinters. In the neutral zone before the official race start, several riders, including Cyril Gautier, Ilnur Zakarin, and stage 6 winner Alexey Lutsenko, crashed on a roundabout, though all riders involved were able to continue onwards. Once the race did start, a sole rider, Mathieu Ladagnous (Groupama–FDJ), attacked to form the day's breakaway. Around 20 kilometers into the stage, another breakaway attempt was made, as Oliver Naesen (AG2R La Mondiale), Lukas Pöstlberger (Bora–Hansgrohe), Stefan Küng (Groupama–FDJ), Tom Van Asbroeck (Israel Start-Up Nation), Michael Gogl (NTT Pro Cycling), and Jasper Stuyven (Trek–Segafredo) tried to make it up the road. However, with an intermediate sprint along the stage, Deceuninck–Quick-Step, the team of the points classification leader Sam Bennett, quickly reeled back in the six riders.

Out in front, Ladagnous won the mountain point for the only categorized climb, the Côte de Cherveux, and the maximum points at the intermediate sprint before he was eventually caught, winning the stage's combativity award for his efforts. Back in the peloton, many of the sprinters lined it out for the remaining points. Bennett won the sprint for second, with his lead-out man Michael Mørkøv holding on for third ahead of Peter Sagan, Matteo Trentin, and Bryan Coquard. A crash with 30 kilometers left involving several Astana riders forced Ion Izagirre to abandon the race with heavy injuries; he was the second abandonment of the day following Gregor Mühlberger, who had abandoned earlier due to illness. With just over six kilometers left, Pöstlberger was once again on the attack, putting in a late bid for the win. Like before, Deceuninck–Quick-Step were forced to close him down, with Kasper Asgreen and Bob Jungels giving chase. Eventually, they were caught with two kilometers left, with the sprint trains leading the peloton.

The hectic sprint culminated in a bike throw at the line from four riders. Caleb Ewan accelerated out of Bennett's slipstream and won the bike throw for the stage win. Sagan pipped Bennett for second, with Wout van Aert squeezed off the podium. However, shortly after the stage, race officials relegated Sagan to 85th place, last in the lead group, for dangerous behavior during the sprint. van Aert had been leading the sprint on the right side of the road, with Clément Venturini on his wheel. Both Bennett and Sagan were on Venturini's wheel, and when they accelerated, Bennett went left and Sagan went right. With little space between van Aert and the barriers, Sagan used his shoulder to nudge the Belgian, who nearly deviating left into Bennett's path, before accelerating through the widened gap past van Aert. As a result, Sagan missed out on any points, while Bennett, who was elevated to second place and gained 30 points, significantly increased his lead in the points classification over the Slovakian to 68.

Stage 11 Result
Rank	Rider	Team	Time
1	Caleb Ewan (AUS)	Lotto–Soudal	4h 00' 01"
2	Sam Bennett (IRL)	Deceuninck–Quick-Step	+ 0"
3	Wout van Aert (BEL)	Team Jumbo–Visma	+ 0"
4	Bryan Coquard (FRA)	B&B Hotels–Vital Concept	+ 0"
5	Clément Venturini (FRA)	AG2R La Mondiale	+ 0"
6	Mads Pedersen (DEN)	Trek–Segafredo	+ 0"
7	Luka Mezgec (SLO)	Mitchelton–Scott	+ 0"
8	Hugo Hofstetter (FRA)	Israel Start-Up Nation	+ 0"
9	Oliver Naesen (BEL)	AG2R La Mondiale	+ 0"
10	Ryan Gibbons (RSA)	NTT Pro Cycling	+ 0"

General classification after Stage 11
Rank	Rider	Team	Time
1	Primož Roglič (SLO)	Team Jumbo–Visma	46h 15' 24"
2	Egan Bernal (COL)	INEOS Grenadiers	+ 21"
3	Guillaume Martin (FRA)	Cofidis	+ 28"
4	Romain Bardet (FRA)	AG2R La Mondiale	+ 30"
5	Nairo Quintana (COL)	Arkéa–Samsic	+ 32"
6	Rigoberto Urán (COL)	EF Pro Cycling	+ 32"
7	Tadej Pogačar (SLO)	UAE Team Emirates	+ 44"
8	Adam Yates (GBR)	Mitchelton–Scott	+ 1' 02"
9	Miguel Ángel López (COL)	Astana	+ 1' 15"
10	Mikel Landa (ESP)	Bahrain–McLaren	+ 1' 42"
