= 2019 Nokere Koerse =

2019 UCI Europe Tour

Race details
- Dates: 20 March 2019
- Stages: 1
- Distance: 195.6 km (121.5 mi)
- Winning time: 4h 32' 37"

Results
	Winner	Cees Bol (NED)	(Team Sunweb)
	Second	Pascal Ackermann (GER)	(Bora–Hansgrohe)
	Third	Jasper Philipsen (BEL)	(UAE Team Emirates)

The 2019 Danilith Nokere Koerse was the 74th edition of the Nokere Koerse road cycling one day race. It was held on 20 March 2019 as part of the 2019 UCI Europe Tour in category 1.HC.

The race was won by Cees Bol of Team Sunweb, ahead of Pascal Ackermann and Jasper Philipsen.

== Teams ==
Twenty-five teams of up to seven riders started the race.

UCI WorldTeams

- Bora–Hansgrohe
- CCC Team
- Deceuninck–Quick-Step
- Lotto–Soudal
- Team INEOS
- Team Katusha–Alpecin
- Team Sunweb
- Trek–Segafredo
- UAE Team Emirates

UCI Professional Continental Teams

- Androni Giocattoli–Sidermec
- Arkéa–Samsic
- Cofidis
- Corendon–Circus
- Delko–Marseille Provence
- Direct Énergie
- Hagens Berman Axeon
- Israel Cycling Academy
- Nippo–Vini Fantini–Faizanè
- Riwal Readynez
- Roompot–Charles
- Sport Vlaanderen–Baloise
- Vital Concept–B&B Hotels
- Wallonie Bruxelles
- Wanty–Gobert

UCI Continental Teams

- Tarteletto–Isorex

== Results ==
Result
Rank	Rider	Team	Time
1	Cees Bol (NED)	Team Sunweb	4h 32' 37"
2	Pascal Ackermann (GER)	Bora–Hansgrohe	+ 0"
3	Jasper Philipsen (BEL)	UAE Team Emirates	+ 0"
4	Boy van Poppel (NED)	Roompot–Charles	+ 0"
5	Hugo Hofstetter (FRA)	Cofidis	+ 0"
6	Jonas Van Genechten (BEL)	Vital Concept–B&B Hotels	+ 0"
7	Justin Jules (FRA)	Wallonie Bruxelles	+ 0"
8	Bram Welten (NED)	Arkéa–Samsic	+ 0"
9	Jens Debusschere (BEL)	Team Katusha–Alpecin	+ 0"
10	Lawrence Naesen (BEL)	Lotto–Soudal	+ 0"
