= Sam Bennett (cyclist) =

Irish racing cyclist (born 1990)

- Bennett in 2019.

Personal information
- Full name: Sam Bennett
- Nickname: 'Sammy B'
- Born: 16 October 1990 (age 36) Wervik, Flanders, Belgium
- Height: 1.78 m (5 ft 10 in)
- Weight: 73 kg (161 lb; 11 st 7 lb)

Cycling career
- Sport: Cycling
- Current team: Pinarello–Q36.5 Pro Cycling Team
- Discipline: Road
- Role: Rider
- Rider type: Sprinter

Amateur teams
- 2007–2010: Vélo-Club La Pomme Marseille
- 2009: Carrick Wheelers Dan Morrissey
- 2010: Française des Jeux (stagiaire)

Professional teams
- 2011–2013: An Post–Sean Kelly
- 2014–2019: NetApp–Endura
- 2020–2021: Deceuninck–Quick-Step
- 2022–2023: Bora–Hansgrohe
- 2024–2025: Decathlon–AG2R La Mondiale
- 2026–: Pinarello–Q36.5 Pro Cycling Team

Major wins
- Grand Tours Tour de France Points classification (2020) 2 individual stages (2020) Giro d'Italia 3 individual stages (2018) Vuelta a España 5 individual stages (2019, 2020, 2022) Stage races Four Days of Dunkirk (2024) One-day races and Classics National Road Race Championships (2019) Classic Brugge–De Panne (2021) Eschborn–Frankfurt (2022) Münsterland Giro (2017) Clásica de Almería (2014)

Sam Bennett (born 16 October 1990) is an Irish professional cyclist who rides for UCI WorldTeam Pinarello–Q36.5 Pro Cycling Team. He is a road sprinter who turned professional in 2011. He has won ten Grand Tour stages: three stages in the 2018 Giro d'Italia, two stages at the 2019 Vuelta a España, two stages at the 2020 Tour de France, where he also won the Points classification, one stage at the 2020 Vuelta a España, and two stages at the 2022 Vuelta a España.

== Early life ==
Bennett was born in 1990 in Wervik, Flanders, Belgium, where his father Michael came in 1989 to play professional football for local club Eendracht Wervik. He moved with his parents to their native Ireland at the age of four, where he spent most of his early years growing up in Carrick-on-Suir, the hometown of fellow cyclist Sean Kelly.

== Career ==
=== Early career ===
Bennett was head-hunted by Vélo-Club La Pomme Marseille at 17, and joined them in the south of France, after completing his first year of third-level education at Waterford Institute of Technology (where he was embarking on an Honours Degree in Health and Exercise Studies). In 2009, Bennett rode, for the first time, the Rás Tailteann with the Carrick Wheelers Dan Morrissey squad. During the 2010 season, Bennett won the under-23 road race at the Irish National Cycling Championships in Sligo, aged 19.

=== An Post–Sean Kelly (2011–13) ===
In 2011, Bennett left France and joined Sean Kelly's An Post–Sean Kelly squad, under the tutelage of manager Kurt Bogaerts. He again won the under-23 road race at the Irish National Cycling Championships and also the Grote Prijs Stad Geel, a UCI 1.2 ranked one day race.

The following year he finished tenth in the under-23 road race at the UCI Road World Championships in Limburg, and seventh in the under-23 road race at the UEC European Road Championships.

In 2013, Bennett won two stages at Rás Tailteann – stage 3 into Listowel and stage 8 in Skerries – and stage 5 of the Tour of Britain, in which he also took two second places.

=== NetApp–Endura (2014–19) ===
==== 2014 season ====
Having joined NetApp–Endura in 2014, Bennett took his first professional win at the UCI 1.1 ranked Clásica de Almería and won twice in Germany: the Rund um Köln and stage 5 of the 1.HC ranked Bayern–Rundfahrt into Nuremberg.

==== 2015 season ====
The 2015 season began for Bennett at the Tour of Qatar, where he won the final stage, finishing in the Doha Corniche. Bennett won the first and third stages at the Bayern–Rundfahrt, allowing him to wear his first professional points classification jersey. Bennett was involved in a mass crash at the end of the Scheldeprijs. Bennett began the Tour de France sick, having been diagnosed with a hernia on his diaphragm. He completed 16 stages of the race before abandoning. He returned to racing at the Arctic Race of Norway and won stage 2 into Setermoen; he finished 2nd in the points classification to Alexander Kristoff. Bennett took his final win of the season at Paris–Bourges in a sprint finish.

==== 2016 season ====
In March 2016, Bennett won the first stage of the Critérium International in Corsica. Bennett's Tour de France effort was hindered by a crash that resulted in broken fingers on his right hand, but he continued to finish the race last in the general classification – the lanterne rouge – and finishing in the top 10 on the final stage in Paris. After recovering from his Tour injuries, Bennett went on to take a stage win at the Giro di Toscana, and won the points classification. The following month, he won his second consecutive Paris–Bourges.

==== 2017 season ====
The team became known as Bora–Hansgrohe for the 2017 season. On 7 March 2017, Bennett won Stage 3 of the Paris–Nice. Bennett went on to win 2 stages of the Tour of Slovenia in June, and won the points classification. At the Czech Cycling Tour, he again won two stages and the points classification jersey. In September, he won the Münsterland Giro in a photo-finish. In October, Bennett won four out of the six stages of the 2017 Tour of Turkey.

==== 2018 & 2019 seasons ====
Bennett started the season in the Tour Down Under, despite having an illness. He also started in the Paris–Nice, but had to abandon midway through stage 3 due to sickness. At the Volta a Catalunya, Bennett finished second on stage two. On 11 May 2018, he achieved his maiden Grand Tour stage victory, winning the seventh stage of the Giro d'Italia in Praia a Mare, in a sprint finish. He then added further stage victories on stage 12, finishing at the Autodromo Internazionale Enzo e Dino Ferrari motor racing circuit in Imola, and the final stage into Rome.

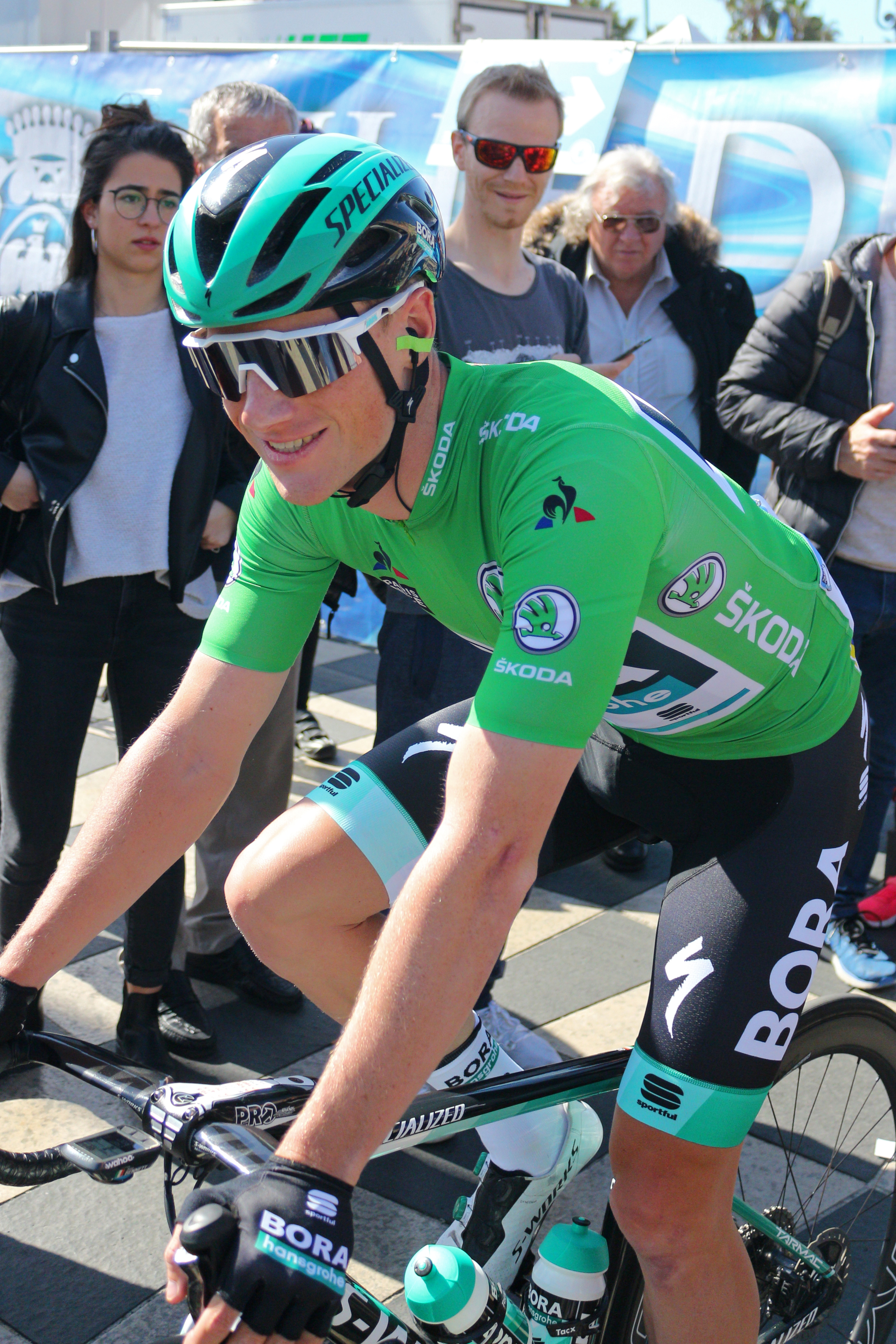
Bennett at the 2019 Paris–Nice, where he won two stages.

In August 2019, he was named in the startlist for the Vuelta a España, his first time competing in the Vuelta a España. On 26 August, he won Stage 3. He also won Stage 14, and finished in second place on four other stages; he finished third in the points classification behind overall contenders Primož Roglič and Tadej Pogačar.

=== Deceuninck–Quick-Step (2020–21) ===
In December 2019, Bennett signed a two-year contract with Belgian team Deceuninck–Quick-Step.

==== 2020 season ====
He was named in the team to compete in the Tour de France and narrowly finished in second place in a sprint finish on stage 3. On stage 5, Bennett finished in third place and took the green jersey, becoming the first Irish rider to lead one of the classifications in the Tour since Sean Kelly won the same jersey in 1989. On stage 10, Bennett won his first stage in a sprint finish and also regained the green jersey from Peter Sagan, its seven-time winner. Bennett became the sixth Irish cyclist to win a stage at the Tour de France, after Shay Elliott, Kelly, Stephen Roche, Martin Earley and Dan Martin, and the second, after Elliott, to win a stage in every Grand Tour. On 20 September, Bennett won his second stage of the Tour, becoming only the fifth cyclist to win the final stage of the Tour de France while wearing the green jersey, and the second Irish (and the second from the small town of Carrick-on-Suir) cyclist to win the Green Jersey (after Kelly, who won it 4 times, in 1982, 1983, 1985, and 1989).

He won Stage 4 of the Vuelta a España. On stage 9, he crossed the line first but was relegated for a 'shove' in the final kilometre, with the stage win being awarded to Germany's Pascal Ackermann. In the final stage, he again lost out to Ackermann when he was narrowly beaten into 2nd place in the sprint, thus failing by the width of a wheel-rim to achieve a win on the last-day stage of each Grand Tour, after final-day stage wins in the 2018 Giro d'Italia and the 2020 Tour de France.

==== 2021 season ====
Bennett missed the 2021 Tour de France due to a knee injury.

=== Bora–Hansgrohe ===
In August 2021, Bennett was announced to be rejoining Bora–Hansgrohe on a two-year contract, along with his teammate Shane Archbold.

Bennett was not part of the Bora–Hansgrohe team that took part in the 2022 Tour de France. In August, Bennett won the second and third stages of the 2022 Vuelta a España in two sprint finishes. He became the second Irish rider to win at least 10 stages in Grand Tours after Sean Kelly.

=== Decathlon–AG2R La Mondiale (2024–2025) ===
In November 2023, Bennett signed with the Decathlon–AG2R La Mondiale team for 2024.

==== 2024 season ====
In May he won the Four Days of Dunkirk after winning four of the six stages of the race, it was the first general classification win of his professional career.

=== Pinarello-Q36.5 (2026) ===
In November 2025, Bennett signed with the Pinarello–Q36.5 Pro Cycling Team team for 2026.

== Career achievements ==
=== Major results ===
2008
1st Points race, UEC European Junior Track Championships
1st Road race, National Junior Road Championships
1st Martin Donnelly Junior Tour
2009
1st Alleins GP
1st Stage 7 Rás Tailteann
5th Road race, National Under-23 Road Championships
2010
1st Road race, National Under-23 Road Championships
1st Stage 4 Rhône-Alpes Isère Tour
7th Grand Prix de Vougy
8th Dijon–Auxonne–Dijon
2011
National Road Championships

1st Under-23 road race
5th Road race

1st Grote Prijs Stad Geel
2012
3rd Ronde van Noord-Holland
7th Road race, UEC European Under-23 Road Championships
8th Grote Prijs Stad Zottegem
10th Road race, UCI Under-23 Road World Championships
2013 (1 pro win)
1st Overall Suir Valley 3 Day
Rás Tailteann

1st Stages 3 & 8

1st Stage 5 Tour of Britain
4th Schaal Sels
4th Kernen Omloop Echt-Susteren
7th Dutch Food Valley Classic
10th Omloop van het Waasland
2014 (3)
1st Clásica de Almería
1st Rund um Köln
Bayern–Rundfahrt

1st Sprints classification
1st Stage 5

2nd ProRace Berlin
5th Scheldeprijs
6th RideLondon–Surrey Classic
2015 (5)
1st Paris–Bourges
Bayern–Rundfahrt

1st Stages 1 & 3

1st Stage 6 Tour of Qatar
1st Stage 2 Arctic Race of Norway
2nd Velothon Berlin
4th Trofeo Playa de Palma
10th Trofeo Santanyi-SesSalines-Campos
2016 (3)
1st Paris–Bourges
1st Stage 1 Critérium International
2nd Trofeo Felanitx-Ses Salines-Campos-Porreres
3rd Eschborn–Frankfurt – Rund um den Finanzplatz
4th Trofeo Playa de Palma
5th Overall Giro di Toscana

1st Points classification
1st Stage 2

7th Overall Tour of Qatar
8th Grand Prix de Fourmies
2017 (10)
1st Münsterland Giro
Tour of Turkey

1st Stages 1, 2, 3 & 5

Tour of Slovenia

1st Points classification
1st Stages 1 & 4

Czech Cycling Tour

1st Points classification
1st Stages 2 & 4

1st Stage 3 Paris–Nice
2nd Down Under Classic
8th London–Surrey Classic
10th Grand Prix of Aargau Canton
2018 (7)
1st Rund um Köln
Giro d'Italia

1st Stages 7, 12 & 21

Tour of Turkey

1st Points classification
1st Stages 2, 3 & 6

7th Eschborn–Frankfurt
2019 (13)
1st Road race, National Road Championships
BinckBank Tour

1st Points classification
1st Stages 1, 2 & 3

Tour of Turkey

1st Points classification
1st Stages 1 & 2

Vuelta a España

1st Stages 3 & 14
Held after Stages 4–6

Paris–Nice

1st Stages 3 & 6

1st Stage 3 Critérium du Dauphiné
1st Stage 7 UAE Tour
1st Stage 7 Vuelta a San Juan
2nd London–Surrey Classic
6th Road race, UEC European Road Championships
10th Rund um Köln
2020 (7)
1st Race Torquay
Tour de France

1st Points classification
1st Stages 10 & 21

1st Stage 4 Vuelta a España
1st Stage 1 Tour Down Under
1st Stage 3 Tour de Wallonie
1st Stage 4 Vuelta a Burgos
8th Scheldeprijs
2021 (7)
1st Classic Brugge–De Panne
Paris–Nice

1st Stages 1 & 5

UAE Tour

1st Stages 4 & 6

Volta ao Algarve

1st Points classification
1st Stages 1 & 3

2nd Scheldeprijs
2022 (3)
1st Eschborn–Frankfurt
Vuelta a España

1st Stages 2 & 3
Held after Stages 2–7

3rd Paris–Tours
5th Road race, UEC European Road Championships
5th Münsterland Giro
5th Rund um Köln
5th Ronde van Limburg
2023 (3)
Sibiu Cycling Tour

1st Points classification
1st Stage 1 & 4a

1st Stage 1 Vuelta a San Juan
3rd Road race, National Road Championships
2024 (5)
1st Overall Four Days of Dunkirk

1st Points classification
1st Stages 2, 3, 5 & 6

8th Overall Région Pays de la Loire Tour
9th Overall Tour de la Provence
2025 (4)
Région Pays de la Loire Tour

1st Points classification
1st Stages 1 & 3

Tour de la Provence

1st Stages 1 & 3

=== Grand Tour general classification results timeline ===
Grand Tour	2015	2016	2017	2018	2019	2020	2021	2022	2023	2024
Giro d'Italia	—	—	158	112	—	—	—	—	—	—
Tour de France	DNF	174	—	—	—	138	—	—	—	DNF
Vuelta a España	—	—	—	—	134	137	—	DNF	—	—

=== Classics results timeline ===
Monument	2014	2015	2016	2017	2018	2019	2020	2021	2022	2023	2024
Milan–San Remo	—	78	129	66	—	28	60	42	—	DNF	—
Tour of Flanders	DNF	—	—	—	—	—	—	—	—	—	—
Paris–Roubaix	134	—	OTL	—	—	—	NH	—	—	—	—
Liège–Bastogne–Liège	Has not contested during his career										
Giro di Lombardia	Has not contested during his career										
Classic	2014	2015	2016	2017	2018	2019	2020	2021	2022	2023	2024
Kuurne–Brussels–Kuurne	—	19	DNF	24	DNF	—	—	—	—	—	—
Brugge–De Panne	Previously a stage race				—	—	—	1	17	DNF	—
Gent–Wevelgem	12	DNF	—	17	—	—	DNF	55	106	DNF	DNF
Scheldeprijs	5	DNF	12	—	—	—	8	2	13	—	—
Eschborn–Frankfurt	—	NH	3	22	7	—	NH	—	1	69	DNF
Hamburg Cyclassics	—	113	130	11	—	—	NH	NH	—	DNF	
Münsterland Giro	—	11	—	1	11	—	—	—	5	—	
Paris–Tours	—	100	15	—	—	—	—	—	3	—	

Legend
—	Did not compete
DNF	Did not finish
IP	In progress
NH	Not held
OTL	Outside of time limit
