= 2022 Eschborn–Frankfurt =

One-day cycling race in Germany

2022 UCI World Tour, race 19 of 32

Race details
- Dates: 1 May 2022
- Stages: 1
- Distance: 185 km (115 mi)
- Winning time: 4h 27' 52"

Results
	Winner	Sam Bennett (IRL)	(Bora–Hansgrohe)
	Second	Fernando Gaviria (COL)	(UAE Team Emirates)
	Third	Alexander Kristoff (NOR)	(Intermarché–Wanty–Gobert Matériaux)

The 2022 Eschborn–Frankfurt was a road cycling one-day race that took place on 1 May 2022 in the Frankfurt Rhein-Main metro area in southwest Germany. It was the 59th edition of Eschborn–Frankfurt, and the 19th event of the 2022 UCI World Tour.

The race was won by Sam Bennett (Bora–Hansgrohe) in a bunch sprint after the break was caught with 42km to go.

== Teams ==
11 of the 18 UCI WorldTeams and eight UCI ProTeams made up the nineteen teams that participated in the race. UAE Team Emirates and B&B Hotels–KTM, with six riders, were the only teams to not enter a full squad of seven riders. In total, 133 riders started the race, of which 116 finished.

The favourites for the race included Jasper Philipsen (Alpecin–Fenix), John Degenkolb (Team DSM) and Alexander Kristoff (Intermarché–Wanty–Gobert Matériaux).

UCI WorldTeams

- AG2R Citroën Team
- Bora–Hansgrohe
- Cofidis
- EF Education–EasyPost
- Intermarché–Wanty–Gobert Matériaux
- Israel–Premier Tech
- Lotto–Soudal
- Team Bahrain Victorious
- Team DSM
- Trek–Segafredo
- UAE Team Emirates

UCI ProTeams

- Alpecin–Fenix
- Arkéa–Samsic
- B&B Hotels–KTM
- Bingoal Pauwels Sauces WB
- Burgos BH
- Sport Vlaanderen–Baloise
- Team TotalEnergies
- Uno-X Pro Cycling Team

== Result ==
Result
Rank	Rider	Team	Time
1	Sam Bennett (IRL)	Bora–Hansgrohe	4h 27' 52"
2	Fernando Gaviria (COL)	UAE Team Emirates	+ 0"
3	Alexander Kristoff (NOR)	Intermarché–Wanty–Gobert Matériaux	+ 0"
4	Phil Bauhaus (GER)	Team Bahrain Victorious	+ 0"
5	Danny van Poppel (NED)	Bora–Hansgrohe	+ 0"
6	Edward Theuns (BEL)	Trek–Segafredo	+ 0"
7	Arnaud De Lie (BEL)	Lotto–Soudal	+ 0"
8	Simone Consonni (ITA)	Cofidis	+ 0"
9	Piet Allegaert (BEL)	Cofidis	+ 0"
10	Lorrenzo Manzin (FRA)	Team TotalEnergies	+ 0"
