= Cees Bol =

Dutch cyclist (born 1995)

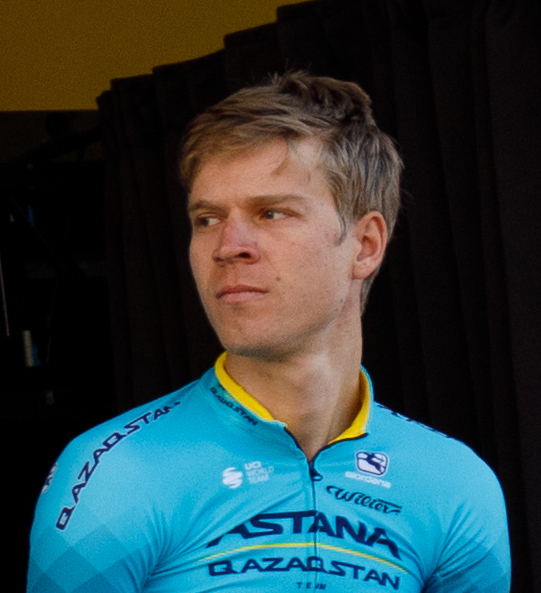
- Bol at the 2023 Paris–Nice

Personal information
- Full name: Cees Bol
- Born: July 27, 1995 (age 31) Zaandam, Netherlands
- Height: 1.94 m (6 ft 4 in)
- Weight: 83 kg (183 lb)

Cycling career
- Sport: Cycling
- Current team: Decathlon CMA CGM
- Discipline: Road
- Role: Rider
- Rider type: Sprinter

Professional teams
- 2014–2016: Rabobank Development Team
- 2017–2018: SEG Racing Academy
- 2018: Team Sunweb (stagiaire)
- 2019–2022: Team Sunweb
- 2023–2025: Astana Qazaqstan Team
- 2026–: Decathlon CMA CGM

Major wins
- One-day races and Classics Nokere Koerse (2019)

Cees Bol (born 27 July 1995) is a Dutch cyclist, who currently rides for UCI WorldTeam Decathlon CMA CGM, having previously raced for XDS Astana Team. In July 2019, he was named in the startlist for the 2019 Tour de France. He also raced the 2020 and 2021 Tours de France as a sprinter. For the 2023 Tour de France his role was leadout for Mark Cavendish, and repeated this role in 2024.

He signed for Decathlon CMA CGM ahead of the 2026 season., and rode the Tour de France as leadout man for their sprinter, Olav Kooij, who won stage 5. Bol also finished last overall in GC, becoming the Lanterne rouge of that year's Tour.

== Major results ==
2014
10th Baronie Breda Classic
2015
1st Sprints classification, Ster ZLM Toer
2016
1st Overall Olympia's Tour
4th Overall Ronde de l'Oise
4th Overall Paris–Arras Tour
8th Overall Boucles de la Mayenne
10th Grand Prix de la ville de Pérenchies
10th Ronde van Vlaanderen U23
2018
1st Flèche Ardennaise
2nd Overall Circuit des Ardennes
2nd Grote Prijs Marcel Kint
2nd Arno Wallaard Memorial
2nd Ronde van Noord-Holland
3rd Lillehammer GP
4th Overall Tour de Bretagne

1st Points classification
1st Stage 5

4th Midden–Brabant Poort Omloop
5th Heistse Pijl
5th Ronde van Overijssel
7th Slag om Norg
8th Gylne Gutuer
9th Famenne Ardenne Classic
10th Binche–Chimay–Binche
2019 (3 pro wins)
1st Nokere Koerse
1st Stage 7 Tour of California
5th Overall Tour of Norway

1st Stage 1

5th Kampioenschap van Vlaanderen
2020 (1)
1st Stage 3 Volta ao Algarve
2021 (1)
1st Madison, National Track Championships (with Yoeri Havik)
1st Stage 2 Paris–Nice
3rd Overall Okolo Slovenska
7th Classic Brugge–De Panne
2022 (1)
1st Stage 2 Tour of Britain
2023
3rd Overall Four Days of Dunkirk
5th Overall ZLM Tour
6th Overall Saudi Tour
2024
4th Scheldeprijs
5th Road race, National Road Championships
6th Paris–Tours
2025
6th Tro-Bro Léon
6th Classique Dunkerque
2026 (1)
1st Stage 4 Tour of Britain
8th Kuurne–Brussels–Kuurne

=== Grand Tour general classification results timeline ===
Grand Tour	2019	2020	2021	2022	2023	2024	2025	2026
Giro d'Italia	—	—	—	DNF	—	—	—	—
Tour de France	DNF	140	140	—	149	138	DNF	158
Vuelta a España	—	—	—	—	—	—	—	

Legend
—	Did not compete
DNF	Did not finish
