= 2022 in men's road cycling =

2022 in men's road cycling includes the 2022 men's bicycle races governed by the Union Cycliste Internationale. The races are part of the UCI Road Calendar.

== World Championships ==
The Road World Championships were held in Wollongong, New South Wales, Australia from 18 to 25 September 2022.

Events at the 2022 UCI Road World Championships
Race	Date	Winner	Second	Third	Ref
Individual Time Trial	18 September	(Norway) Tobias Foss (NOR)	(Switzerland) Stefan Küng (SUI)	(Belgium) Remco Evenepoel (BEL)	
Road Race	25 September	Remco Evenepoel (BEL)	(France) Christophe Laporte (FRA)	(Australia) Michael Matthews (AUS)	

== Grand Tours ==
Grand Tours during the 2022 season
Race	Date	Winner	Second	Third	Ref
(Italy) Giro d'Italia	6–29 May	Jai Hindley (AUS)	Richard Carapaz (ECU)	Mikel Landa (ESP)	
Tour de France	1–24 July	Jonas Vingegaard (DEN)	Tadej Pogačar (SLO)	Geraint Thomas (GBR)	
(Spain) Vuelta a España	19 August – 11 September	Remco Evenepoel (BEL)	Enric Mas (ESP)	Juan Ayuso (ESP)	

== UCI World Tour ==
The 2022 calendar was announced in the autumn of 2021.

Races in the 2022 UCI World Tour
Race	Date	Winner	Second	Third	Ref
(United Arab Emirates) UAE Tour	20–26 February	Tadej Pogačar (SLO)	Adam Yates (GBR)	Pello Bilbao (ESP)	
(Belgium) Omloop Het Nieuwsblad	26 February	Wout van Aert (BEL)	Sonny Colbrelli (ITA)	Greg Van Avermaet (BEL)	
(Italy) Strade Bianche	5 March	Tadej Pogačar (SLO)	Alejandro Valverde (ESP)	Kasper Asgreen (DEN)	
(France) Paris–Nice	6–13 March	Primož Roglič (SLO)	Simon Yates (GBR)	Daniel Martínez (COL)	
(Italy) Tirreno–Adriatico	7–13 March	Tadej Pogačar (SLO)	Jonas Vingegaard (DEN)	Mikel Landa (ESP)	
(Italy) Milan–San Remo	19 March	Matej Mohorič (SLO)	Anthony Turgis (FRA)	Mathieu van der Poel (NED)	
(Spain) Volta a Catalunya	21–27 March	Sergio Higuita (COL)	Richard Carapaz (ECU)	João Almeida (POR)	
(Belgium) Classic Brugge–De Panne	23 March	Tim Merlier (BEL)	Dylan Groenewegen (NED)	Nacer Bouhanni (FRA)	
(Belgium) E3 Saxo Bank Classic	25 March	Wout van Aert (BEL)	Christophe Laporte (FRA)	Stefan Küng (SUI)	
(Belgium) Gent–Wevelgem	27 March	Biniam Girmay (ERI)	Christophe Laporte (FRA)	Dries Van Gestel (BEL)	
(Belgium) Dwars door Vlaanderen	30 March	Mathieu van der Poel (NED)	Tiesj Benoot (BEL)	Tom Pidcock (GBR)	
(Belgium) Tour of Flanders	3 April	Mathieu van der Poel (NED)	Dylan van Baarle (NED)	Valentin Madouas (FRA)	
(Spain) Tour of the Basque Country	4–9 April	Daniel Martínez (COL)	Ion Izagirre (ESP)	Aleksandr Vlasov (Note: As of 1 March 2022, the UCI announced that cyclists from Russia and Belarus would no longer compete under the name or flag of those respective countries due to the Russian invasion of Ukraine.)	
(Netherlands) Amstel Gold Race	10 April	Michał Kwiatkowski (POL)	Benoît Cosnefroy (FRA)	Tiesj Benoot (BEL)	
(France) Paris–Roubaix	17 April	Dylan van Baarle (NED)	Wout van Aert (BEL)	Stefan Küng (SUI)	
(Belgium) La Flèche Wallonne	20 April	Dylan Teuns (BEL)	Alejandro Valverde (ESP)	Aleksandr Vlasov	
(Belgium) Liège–Bastogne–Liège	24 April	Remco Evenepoel (BEL)	Quinten Hermans (BEL)	Wout van Aert (BEL)	
(Switzerland) Tour de Romandie	26 April – 1 May	Aleksandr Vlasov	Gino Mäder (SUI)	Simon Geschke (GER)	
(Germany) Eschborn–Frankfurt	1 May	Sam Bennett (IRL)	Fernando Gaviria (COL)	Alexander Kristoff (NOR)	
(France) Critérium du Dauphiné	5–12 June	Primož Roglič (SLO)	Jonas Vingegaard (DEN)	Ben O'Connor (AUS)	
(Switzerland) Tour de Suisse	13–19 June	Geraint Thomas (GBR)	Sergio Higuita (COL)	Jakob Fuglsang (DEN)	
(Spain) Clásica de San Sebastián	30 July	Remco Evenepoel (BEL)	Pavel Sivakov (FRA)	Tiesj Benoot (BEL)	
(Poland) Tour de Pologne	30 July – 5 August	Ethan Hayter (GBR)	Thymen Arensman (NED)	Pello Bilbao (ESP)	
(Belgium) / (Netherlands) Benelux Tour	7–13 August	Cancelled due to the overcrowded cycling calendar			
(Germany) Hamburg Cyclassics	21 August	Marco Haller (AUT)	Wout van Aert (BEL)	Quinten Hermans (BEL)	
Bretagne Classic Ouest–France	28 August	Wout van Aert (BEL)	Axel Laurance (FRA)	Alexander Kamp (DEN)	
(Canada) Grand Prix Cycliste de Québec	9 September	Benoît Cosnefroy (FRA)	Michael Matthews (AUS)	Biniam Girmay (ERI)	
(Canada) Grand Prix Cycliste de Montréal	11 September	Tadej Pogačar (SLO)	Wout van Aert (BEL)	Andrea Bagioli (ITA)	
(Italy) Il Lombardia	8 October	Tadej Pogačar (SLO)	Enric Mas (ESP)	Mikel Landa (ESP)	
(China) Tour of Guangxi	13–18 October				

== UCI ProSeries ==
Races in the 2022 UCI ProSeries
Race	Date	Winner	Team	Ref.
(Argentina) Vuelta a San Juan	30 January – 2 February	Cancelled		
(Spain) Volta a la Comunitat Valenciana	2–6 February	Aleksandr Vlasov (RUS)	Bora–Hansgrohe	
(France) Tour de la Provence	10–13 February	Nairo Quintana (COL)	Arkéa–Samsic	
Tour of Oman	10–15 February	Jan Hirt (CZE)	Intermarché–Wanty–Gobert Matériaux	
(Spain) Clásica de Almería	13 February	Alexander Kristoff (NOR)	Intermarché–Wanty–Gobert Matériaux	
(Portugal) Volta ao Algarve	16–20 February	Remco Evenepoel (BEL)	Quick-Step Alpha Vinyl Team	
(Spain) Vuelta a Andalucía	16–20 February	Wout Poels (NED)	Team Bahrain Victorious	
(France) Faun-Ardèche Classic	26 February	Brandon McNulty (USA)	UAE Team Emirates	
(Belgium) Kuurne–Brussels–Kuurne	27 February	Fabio Jakobsen (NED)	Quick-Step Alpha Vinyl Team	
(France) La Drôme Classic	27 February	Jonas Vingegaard (DEN)	Team Jumbo–Visma	
(Italy) Trofeo Laigueglia	2 March	Jan Polanc (SLO)	UAE Team Emirates	
(Italy) Milano–Torino	16 March	Mark Cavendish (GBR)	Quick-Step Alpha Vinyl Team	
(Belgium) Nokere Koerse	16 March	Tim Merlier (BEL)	Alpecin–Fenix	
(France) Grand Prix de Denain	17 March	Max Walscheid (GER)	Cofidis	
(Belgium) Bredene Koksijde Classic	18 March	Pascal Ackermann (GER)	UAE Team Emirates	
(Italy) GP Industria & Artigianato	27 March	Diego Ulissi (ITA)	UAE Team Emirates	
(Spain) GP Miguel Induráin	2 April	Warren Barguil (FRA)	Arkéa–Samsic	
(Belgium) Scheldeprijs	6 April	Alexander Kristoff (NOR)	Intermarché–Wanty–Gobert Matériaux	
Presidential Tour of Turkey	10–17 April	Patrick Bevin (NZL)	Israel–Premier Tech	
(Belgium) Brabantse Pijl	13 April	Magnus Sheffield (USA)	Ineos Grenadiers	
(Italy) Tour of the Alps	18–22 April	Romain Bardet (FRA)	Team DSM	
(France) Four Days of Dunkirk	3–8 May	Philippe Gilbert (BEL)	Lotto–Soudal	
(France) Grand Prix du Morbihan	14 May	Julien Simon (FRA)	Team TotalEnergies	
(France) Tro-Bro Léon	15 May	Hugo Hofstetter (FRA)	Arkéa–Samsic	
Tour of Norway	24–29 May	Remco Evenepoel (BEL)	Quick-Step Alpha Vinyl Team	
(France) Boucles de la Mayenne	26–29 May	Benjamin Thomas (FRA)	Cofidis	
(Belgium) Brussels Cycling Classic	5 June	Taco van der Hoorn (NED)	Intermarché–Wanty–Gobert Matériaux	
(Netherlands) ZLM Tour	8–12 June	Olav Kooij (NED)	Team Jumbo–Visma	
(Belgium) Dwars door het Hageland	11 June	Oscar Riesebeek (NED)	Alpecin–Fenix	
(Malaysia) Tour de Langkawi	11–18 June (Note: In late January, race organisers postponed the Tour de Langkawi, originally scheduled for 3–10 March, due to a recent surge in COVID-19 pandemic cases.)			
Tour of Belgium	15–19 June	Mauro Schmid (SUI)	Quick-Step Alpha Vinyl Team	
Tour of Slovenia	15–19 June	Tadej Pogačar (SLO)	UAE Team Emirates	
(Belgium) Tour de Wallonie	23–27 July	Robert Stannard (AUS)	Alpecin–Fenix	
(United States) Tour of Utah	25–31 July	Cancelled		
(China) Tour of Qinghai Lake	27 July–3 August (Note: Originally scheduled for 10–17 July.)	Liu Jiankun (CHN)	Pingtan International Tourism Island Cycling Team	
(Spain) Vuelta a Burgos	2–6 August	Pavel Sivakov (FRA)	Ineos Grenadiers	
Arctic Race of Norway	4–7 August	Andreas Leknessund (NOR)	Team DSM	
(Belgium) Circuit Franco–Belge	10 August	Alexander Kristoff (NOR)	Intermarché–Wanty–Gobert Matériaux	
(Denmark) Danmark Rundt	16–20 August	Christophe Laporte (FRA)	Team Jumbo–Visma	
(Germany) Deutschland Tour	24–28 August	Adam Yates (GBR)	Ineos Grenadiers	
(United States) Maryland Cycling Classic	4 September	Sep Vanmarcke (BEL)	Israel–Premier Tech	
(United Kingdom) Tour of Britain	4–8 September	Gonzalo Serrano (ESP)	Movistar Team	
(France) Grand Prix de Fourmies	11 September	Caleb Ewan (AUS)	Lotto–Soudal	
Tour de Luxembourg	13–17 September	Mattias Skjelmose Jensen (DEN)	Trek–Segafredo	
(Belgium) Grand Prix de Wallonie	14 September	Mathieu van der Poel (NED)	Alpecin–Deceuninck	
(Italy) Coppa Sabatini	15 September	Daniel Martínez (COL)	Ineos Grenadiers	
(Belgium) Primus Classic	17 September	Jordi Meeus (BEL)	Bora–Hansgrohe	
(Italy) Giro dell'Emilia	1 October	Enric Mas (ESP)	Movistar Team	
(Germany) Münsterland Giro	3 October	Olav Kooij (NED)	Team Jumbo–Visma	
(Italy) Coppa Bernocchi	3 October			
(Italy) Tre Valli Varesine	4 October			
(Italy) Gran Piemonte	6 October			
(China) Tour of Taihu Lake	8–11 October			
(France) Paris–Tours	9 October			
Japan Cup	16 October			

== Championships ==
2022 Continental Championships
Championships	Race	Date	Winner	Second	Third	Ref
African Championships; Egypt	Team Time Trial	23 March	Eritrea	South Africa	Algeria	
African Championships; Egypt	Team Time Trial	23 March	Aklilu Gebrehiwet; Mikiel Habtom; Henok Mulubrhan; Dawit Yemane	Gustav Basson; Reinardt Janse Van Rensburg; Kent Main; Callum Ormiston	Salah Eddine Ayoubi Cherki; Azzedine Lagab; Hamza Mansouri; Islam Mansouri	
African Championships; Egypt	Individual Time Trial	24 March	(South Africa) Gustav Basson	(Eritrea) Henok Mulubrhan	(Rwanda) Jean Bosco Nsengimana	
African Championships; Egypt	Road Race	27 March	(Eritrea) Henok Mulubrhan	(South Africa) Reinardt Janse van Rensburg	(Algeria) Hamza Amari	
Pan American Championships; Argentina	Individual Time Trial	12 May	Rodrigo Contreras (COL)	Walter Vargas (COL)	Orluis Aular (VEN)	
Pan American Championships; Argentina	Road Race	15 May	Emiliano Contreras (ARG)	Leonidas Sebastián Novoa (ECU)	Sixto Nuñez (URY)	
European Championships; Germany	Individual Time Trial	17 August	Stefan Bissegger (CHE)	Stefan Küng (CHE)	Filippo Ganna (ITA)	
European Championships; Germany	Road Race	14 August	Fabio Jakobsen (NLD)	Arnaud Démare (FRA)	Tim Merlier (BEL)	
Oceania Championships; Australia	Individual time trial	9 April	Aaron Gate (NZL)	Tom Sexton (NZL)	Michael Freiberg (AUS)	
Oceania Championships; Australia	Road Race	10 April	James Fouché (NZL)	Tom Sexton (NZL)	Zack Gilmore (AUS)	

== UCI Teams ==
=== UCI WorldTeams ===
The following eighteen teams have received a UCI WorldTour license for the 2022 season.

- (France) AG2R Citroën Team
- (Kazakhstan) Astana Qazaqstan Team
- (Germany) Bora–Hansgrohe
- (France) Cofidis
- (Belgium) Quick-Step Alpha Vinyl Team
- (United States) EF Education–EasyPost
- (France) Groupama–FDJ
- (United Kingdom) Ineos Grenadiers
- (Belgium) Intermarché–Wanty–Gobert Matériaux
- Israel–Premier Tech
- (Belgium) Lotto–Soudal
- (Spain) Movistar Team
- Team Bahrain Victorious
- (Australia) Team BikeExchange–Jayco
- (Germany) Team DSM
- (Netherlands) Team Jumbo–Visma
- (United States) Trek–Segafredo
- (United Arab Emirates) UAE Team Emirates
