= 2022 Arkéa–Samsic (men's team) season =

Arkéa–Samsic
- 2022 season
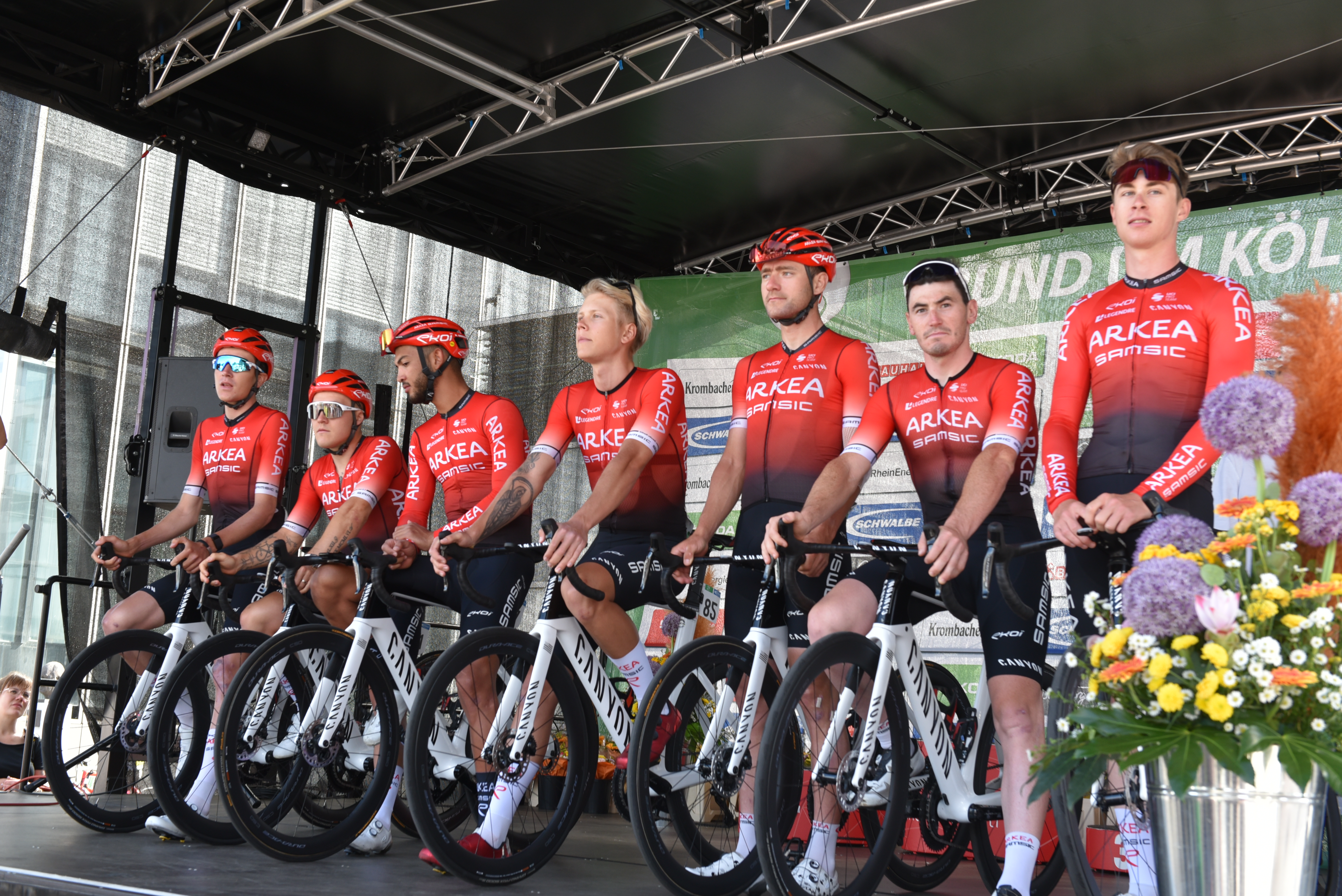
- Arkéa–Samsic at Rund um Köln
- UCI code: ARK
- Status: UCI ProTeam
- Manager: Emmanuel Hubert (FRA)
- Main sponsor(s): Crédit mutuel Arkéa; Samsic
- Based: France
- Bicycles: Canyon
- Groupset: Shimano

Season victories
- One-day races: 6
- Stage race overall: 2
- Stage race stages: 4
- Jersey

The 2022 season for Arkéa–Samsic is the 19th season in the team's existence, the 12th as a UCI ProTeam, and the third under the current name. They use Canyon bicycles, Shimano drivetrain, Shimano wheels and EKOI clothing.

The team had finished as the second-best UCI ProTeam in the 2021 season behind Alpecin–Fenix, and will receive automatic invitations to all 2022 UCI World Tour events. In previous years, with 19 UCI WorldTeams, only the best-placed UCI ProTeam from the previous season would receive automatic invitations to all UCI World Tour events that season. However, those privileges were extended to Arkéa–Samsic with Team Qhubeka NextHash ceasing WorldTeam operations after the 2021 season, meaning that there are only 18 UCI WorldTeams for the 2022 season.

== Team roster ==
As of 13 February 2022.

Rider	Date of birth
Winner Anacona (COL)	11 August 1988 (aged 33)
Warren Barguil (FRA)	28 October 1991 (aged 30)
Maxime Bouet (FRA)	3 November 1986 (aged 35)
Nacer Bouhanni (FRA)	25 July 1990 (aged 31)
Amaury Capiot (BEL)	25 June 1993 (aged 28)
Benjamin Declercq (BEL)	4 February 1994 (aged 27)
Anthony Delaplace (FRA)	11 September 1989 (aged 32)
Nicolas Edet (FRA)	2 November 1987 (aged 34)
Miguel Flórez (COL)	21 February 1996 (aged 25)
Élie Gesbert (FRA)	1 July 1995 (aged 26)
Donavan Grondin (FRA)	26 September 2000 (aged 21)
Thibault Guernalec (FRA)	31 July 1997 (aged 24)
Simon Guglielmi (FRA)	1 July 1997 (aged 24)
Romain Hardy (FRA)	24 August 1988 (aged 33)
Hugo Hofstetter (FRA)	13 February 1994 (aged 27)

Rider	Date of birth
Kévin Ledanois (FRA)	13 July 1993 (aged 28)
Matis Louvel (FRA)	19 July 1999 (aged 22)
Daniel McLay (GBR)	3 January 1992 (aged 29)
Christophe Noppe (BEL)	29 November 1994 (aged 27)
Łukasz Owsian (POL)	24 February 1990 (aged 31)
Markus Pajur (EST)	23 September 2000 (aged 21)
Laurent Pichon (FRA)	19 July 1986 (aged 35)
Dayer Quintana (COL)	10 August 1992 (aged 29)
Nairo Quintana (COL)	4 February 1990 (aged 31)
Michel Ries (LUX)	11 March 1998 (aged 23)
Alan Riou (FRA)	2 April 1997 (aged 24)
Clément Russo (FRA)	20 January 1995 (aged 26)
Connor Swift (GBR)	30 October 1995 (aged 26)
Kévin Vauquelin (FRA)	26 April 2001 (aged 20)
Alessandro Verre (ITA)	17 November 2001 (aged 20)

Riders who joined the team for the 2022 season

Rider	2021 team
Nicolas Edet	Cofidis
Simon Guglielmi	Groupama–FDJ
Hugo Hofstetter	Israel Start-Up Nation
Michel Ries	Trek–Segafredo
Kévin Vauquelin	neo-pro (VC Rouen 76)
Alessandro Verre	neo-pro (Team Colpack–Ballan)

Riders who left the team during or after the 2021 season

Rider	2022 team
Thomas Boudat	Go Sport–Roubaix–Lille Métropole
Diego Rosa	Eolo–Kometa
Bram Welten	Groupama–FDJ

== Season victories ==
Date	Race	Competition	Rider	Country	Location	Ref.
30 January	Grand Prix La Marseillaise	UCI Europe Tour	Amaury Capiot (BEL)	France	Marseille	
13 February	Tour de la Provence, Stage 3	UCI ProSeries	Nairo Quintana (COL)	France	Montagne de Lure	
13 February	Tour de la Provence, Overall	UCI ProSeries	Nairo Quintana (COL)	France		
13 February	Tour de la Provence, Mountains classification	UCI ProSeries	Nairo Quintana (COL)	France		
15 February	Tour of Oman, Team classification	UCI ProSeries	(Note: The riders in the squad were Winner Anacona, Amaury Capiot, Élie Gesbert, Laurent Pichon, and Kévin Vauquelin.)	Oman		
20 February	Tour des Alpes-Maritimes et du Var, Stage 3	UCI Europe Tour	Nairo Quintana (COL)	France	Blausasc	
20 February	Tour des Alpes-Maritimes et du Var, Overall	UCI Europe Tour	Nairo Quintana (COL)	France		
20 February	Tour des Alpes-Maritimes et du Var, Points classification	UCI Europe Tour	Nairo Quintana (COL)	France		
20 February	Tour des Alpes-Maritimes et du Var, Mountains classification	UCI Europe Tour	Nairo Quintana (COL)	France		
11 March	Tirreno–Adriatico, Stage 5	UCI World Tour	Warren Barguil (FRA)	Italy	Fermo	
27 March	La Roue Tourangelle	UCI Europe Tour	Nacer Bouhanni (FRA)	France	Marseille	
2 April	GP Miguel Induráin	UCI ProSeries	Warren Barguil (FRA)	Spain	Estella-Lizarra	
12 April	Paris–Camembert	UCI Europe Tour	Anthony Delaplace (FRA)	France	Livarot	
1 May	Vuelta Asturias, Team classification	UCI Europe Tour	(Note: The riders in the squad were Maxime Bouet, Nicolas Edet, Thibault Guernalec, Michel Ries, Alessandro Verre, and Kévin Vauquelin.)	Spain		
15 May	Tro-Bro Léon	UCI ProSeries	Hugo Hofstetter (FRA)	France	Lannilis	
28 May	Boucles de la Mayenne, Stage 3	UCI ProSeries	Amaury Capiot (BEL)	France	Château-Gontier-sur-Mayenne	
19 June	Route d'Occitanie, Mountains classification	UCI Europe Tour	Winner Anacona (COL)	France		
24 August	Druivenkoers Overijse	UCI Europe Tour	Matis Louvel (FRA)	Belgium	Overijse	

== National, Continental, and World Champions ==
Date	Discipline	Jersey	Rider	Country	Location	Ref.
