= 2019 Tour de la Provence =

2019 UCI Europe Tour
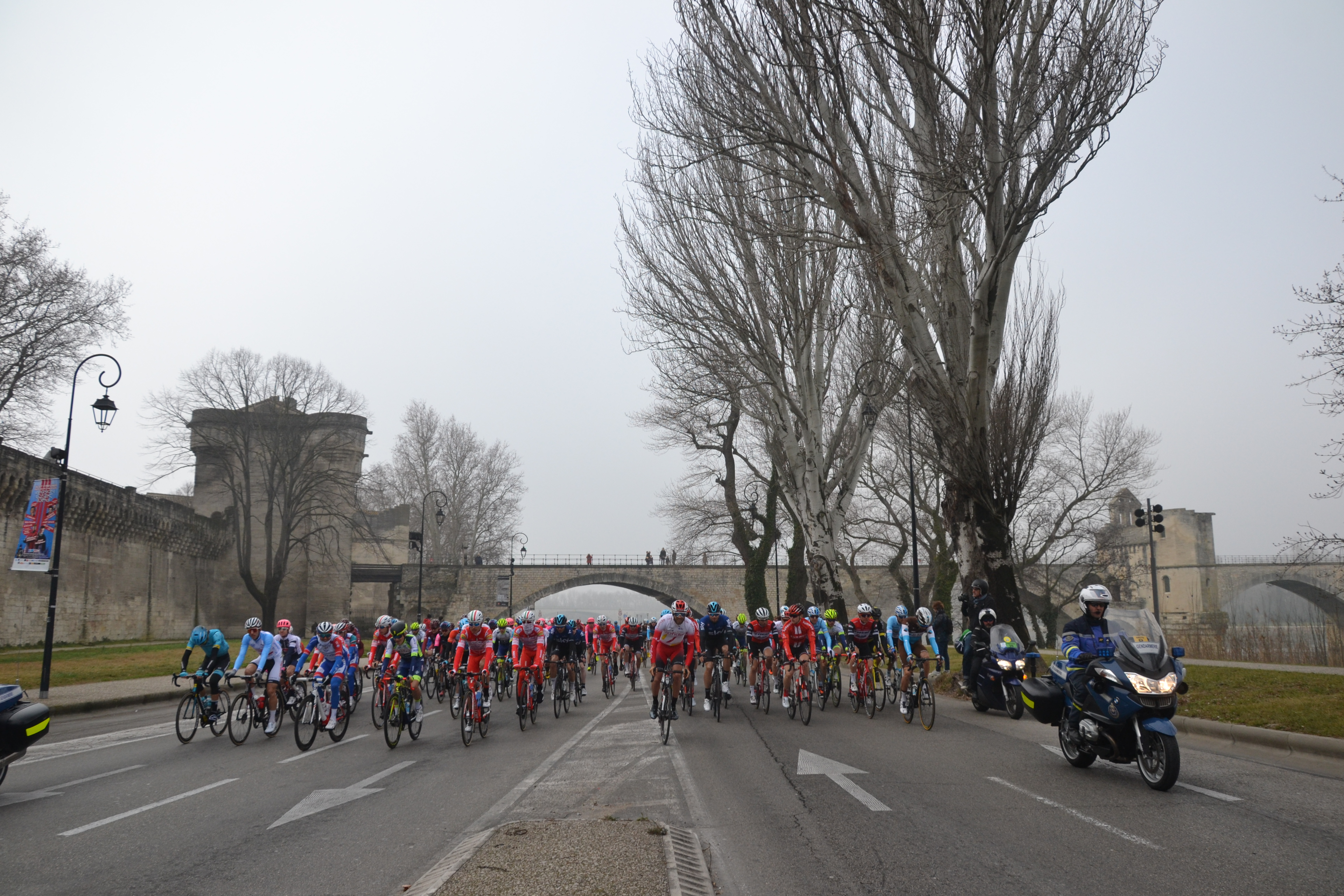
- The peloton in Avignon

Race details
- Dates: 14 February–17 February 2019
- Stages: 4
- Distance: 543.8 km (337.9 mi)
- Winning time: 13h 18' 06"

Results
Jersey awarded to the overall winner	Winner	Gorka Izagirre (ESP)	(Astana)
	Second	Simon Clarke (AUS)	(EF Education First)
	Third	Tony Gallopin (FRA)	(AG2R La Mondiale)

The 2019 Tour de la Provence was a road cycling stage race that took place between 14 and 17 February 2019. The race was rated as a 2.1 event as part of the 2019 UCI Europe Tour, and was the fourth edition of the Tour de la Provence.

The race was won by Spanish rider Gorka Izagirre of the Astana team, winning by less than a second ahead of Australian rider Simon Clarke.

== Teams ==
Twenty-two teams of up to seven riders started the race:

UCI WorldTeams

- AG2R La Mondiale
- EF Education First
- Team Sunweb
- Astana
- Groupama–FDJ
- Deceuninck–Quick-Step
- Movistar Team
- Trek–Segafredo
- Team Sky

UCI Professional Continental teams

- Androni Giocattoli–Sidermec
- Delko–Marseille Provence
- Vital Concept–B&B Hotels
- Arkéa–Samsic
- Wanty–Gobert
- Cofidis
- Israel Cycling Academy
- Corendon–Circus
- Direct Énergie

UCI Continental teams

- Amore & Vita–Prodir
- Maloja Pushbikers
- Natura4Ever–Roubaix–Lille Métropole
- St. Michel–Auber93

== Route ==
Stage characteristics and winners
Stage	Date	Course	Distance	Type	Stage winner
1	14 February	Saintes-Maries-de-la-Mer	8.9 km (5.5 mi)	Individual time trial	Filippo Ganna (ITA)
2	15 February	Istres to La Ciotat	191.6 km (119.1 mi)	Hilly stage	Eduard Prades (ESP)
3	16 February	Aubagne to Circuit du Castellet	181.1 km (112.5 mi)	Hilly stage	Philippe Gilbert (BEL)
4	17 February	Avignon to Aix en Provence	162.2 km (100.8 mi)	Flat stage	John Degenkolb (GER)

== Stages ==
=== Stage 1 ===
Stage 1 result and general classification after Stage 1

Rank	Rider	Team	Time
1	Filippo Ganna (ITA)	Team Sky	10' 05"
2	Sebastian Langeveld (NED)	EF Education First	+ 9"
3	Rémi Cavagna (FRA)	Deceuninck–Quick-Step	+ 10"
4	Jasha Sütterlin (GER)	Movistar Team	+ 15"
5	Kasper Asgreen (DEN)	Deceuninck–Quick-Step	+ 18"
6	Yves Lampaert (BEL)	Deceuninck–Quick-Step	+ 19"
7	Benjamin Thomas (FRA)	Groupama–FDJ	+ 20"
8	Owain Doull (GBR)	Team Sky	+ 21"
9	Sep Vanmarcke (BEL)	EF Education First	+ 24"
10	Yoann Paillot (FRA)	St. Michel–Auber93	+ 25"

=== Stage 2 ===
Stage 2 result

Rank	Rider	Team	Time
1	Eduard Prades (ESP)	Movistar Team	4h 50' 15"
2	Tony Gallopin (FRA)	AG2R La Mondiale	s.t.
3	Gorka Izagirre (ESP)	Astana	s.t.
4	Simon Clarke (AUS)	EF Education First	s.t.
5	Eddie Dunbar (IRL)	Team Sky	s.t.
6	Lilian Calmejane (FRA)	Direct Énergie	s.t.
7	Thibaut Pinot (FRA)	Groupama–FDJ	s.t.
8	David Gaudu (FRA)	Groupama–FDJ	s.t.
9	Rudy Molard (FRA)	Groupama–FDJ	s.t.
10	Philippe Gilbert (BEL)	Deceuninck–Quick-Step	+ 16"

General classification after Stage 2

Rank	Rider	Team	Time
1	Gorka Izagirre (ESP)	Astana	5h 00' 45"
2	Thibaut Pinot (FRA)	Groupama–FDJ	+ 2"
3	Tony Gallopin (FRA)	AG2R La Mondiale	+ 6"
4	Rudy Molard (FRA)	Groupama–FDJ	+ 10"
5	Simon Clarke (AUS)	EF Education First	+ 11"
6	David Gaudu (FRA)	Groupama–FDJ	+ 15"
7	Eddie Dunbar (IRL)	Team Sky	s.t.
8	Eduard Prades (ESP)	Movistar Team	+ 21"
9	Sébastien Reichenbach (SUI)	Groupama–FDJ	+ 26"
10	Jimmy Janssens (BEL)	Corendon–Circus	s.t.

=== Stage 3 ===
Stage 3 result

Rank	Rider	Team	Time
1	Philippe Gilbert (BEL)	Deceuninck–Quick-Step	4h 25' 10"
2	Toms Skujiņš (LAT)	Trek–Segafredo	s.t.
3	Tony Gallopin (FRA)	AG2R La Mondiale	s.t.
4	Simon Clarke (AUS)	EF Education First	s.t.
5	Gorka Izagirre (ESP)	Astana	s.t.
6	Cyril Gautier (FRA)	Vital Concept–B&B Hotels	s.t.
7	Guillaume Martin (FRA)	Wanty–Gobert	s.t.
8	Julien El Fares (FRA)	Delko–Marseille Provence	s.t.
9	Dorian Godon (FRA)	AG2R La Mondiale	s.t.
10	Eddie Dunbar (IRL)	Team Sky	s.t.

General classification after Stage 3

Rank	Rider	Team	Time
1	Gorka Izagirre (ESP)	Astana	9h 25' 55"
2	Thibaut Pinot (FRA)	Groupama–FDJ	+ 2"
3	Tony Gallopin (FRA)	AG2R La Mondiale	s.t.
4	Simon Clarke (AUS)	EF Education First	+ 8"
5	Rudy Molard (FRA)	Groupama–FDJ	+ 10"
6	David Gaudu (FRA)	Groupama–FDJ	+ 15"
7	Eddie Dunbar (IRL)	Team Sky	s.t.
8	Eduard Prades (ESP)	Movistar Team	+ 21"
9	Jimmy Janssens (BEL)	Corendon–Circus	+ 26"
10	Lilian Calmejane (FRA)	Direct Énergie	+ 32"

=== Stage 4 ===
Stage 4 result

Rank	Rider	Team	Time
1	John Degenkolb (GER)	Trek–Segafredo	3h 52' 11"
2	Simon Clarke (AUS)	EF Education First	s.t.
3	Anthony Maldonado (FRA)	St. Michel–Auber93	s.t.
4	Tony Gallopin (FRA)	AG2R La Mondiale	s.t.
5	Damien Touzé (FRA)	Cofidis	s.t.
6	Yves Lampaert (BEL)	Deceuninck–Quick-Step	s.t.
7	Benjamin Thomas (FRA)	Groupama–FDJ	s.t.
8	Philippe Gilbert (BEL)	Deceuninck–Quick-Step	s.t.
9	Warren Barguil (FRA)	Arkéa–Samsic	s.t.
10	August Jensen (NOR)	Israel Cycling Academy	s.t.

== Classifications ==
Final general classification

Rank	Rider	Team	Time
1	Gorka Izagirre (ESP)	Astana	13h 18' 06"
2	Simon Clarke (AUS)	EF Education First	s.t.
3	Tony Gallopin (FRA)	AG2R La Mondiale	+ 1"
4	Thibaut Pinot (FRA)	Groupama–FDJ	+ 2"
5	Rudy Molard (FRA)	Groupama–FDJ	+ 10"
6	David Gaudu (FRA)	Groupama–FDJ	+ 15"
7	Eddie Dunbar (IRL)	Team Sky	s.t.
8	Eduard Prades (ESP)	Movistar Team	+ 21"
9	Jimmy Janssens (BEL)	Corendon–Circus	+ 26"
10	Philippe Gilbert (BEL)	Deceuninck–Quick-Step	+ 29"

Final points classification

Rank	Rider	Team	Points
1	Simon Clarke (AUS)	EF Education First	38
2	Tony Gallopin (FRA)	AG2R La Mondiale	32
3	Philippe Gilbert (BEL)	Deceuninck–Quick-Step	28
4	Gorka Izagirre (ESP)	Astana	19
5	John Degenkolb (GER)	Trek–Segafredo	18
6	Eduard Prades (ESP)	Movistar Team	17
7	Toms Skujiņš (LAT)	Trek–Segafredo	12
8	Eddie Dunbar (IRL)	Team Sky	11
9	Filippo Ganna (ITA)	Team Sky	10
10	Yves Lampaert (BEL)	Deceuninck–Quick-Step	10

Final mountains classification

Rank	Rider	Team	Points
1	Lilian Calmejane (FRA)	Direct Énergie	16
2	Dries De Bondt (BEL)	Corendon–Circus	16
3	Thibaut Pinot (FRA)	Groupama–FDJ	8
4	Eddie Dunbar (IRL)	Team Sky	7
5	David Gaudu (FRA)	Groupama–FDJ	5
6	Jodok Salzmann (AUT)	Maloja Pushbikers	5
7	Anthony Delaplace (FRA)	Arkéa–Samsic	5
8	Fausto Masnada (ITA)	Androni Giocattoli–Sidermec	4
9	Gorka Izagirre (ESP)	Astana	3
10	Lennard Kämna (GER)	Team Sunweb	3

Final young rider classification

Rank	Rider	Team	Time
1	David Gaudu (FRA)	Groupama–FDJ	13h 18' 21"
2	Eddie Dunbar (IRL)	Team Sky	s.t.
3	Michael Storer (AUS)	Team Sunweb	+ 2' 11"
4	Lennard Kämna (GER)	Team Sunweb	+ 2' 54"
5	Hugh Carthy (GBR)	EF Education First	+ 3' 14"
6	Niklas Eg (DEN)	Trek–Segafredo	+ 5' 27"
7	Dorian Godon (FRA)	AG2R La Mondiale	+ 5' 36"
8	Damien Touzé (FRA)	Cofidis	+ 7' 55"
9	Filippo Ganna (ITA)	Team Sky	+ 8' 49"
10	Rémi Cavagna (FRA)	Deceuninck–Quick-Step	+ 11' 42"

Final team classification

Rank	Team	Time
1	Groupama–FDJ	39h 54' 13"
2	Movistar Team	+ 1' 57"
3	Deceuninck–Quick-Step	+ 3' 50"
4	Cofidis	+ 4' 16"
5	Vital Concept–B&B Hotels	+ 5' 31"
6	AG2R La Mondiale	+ 5' 55"
7	Team Sunweb	+ 6' 17"
8	EF Education First	+ 10' 38"
9	Trek–Segafredo	+ 11' 32"
10	Arkéa–Samsic	+ 12' 31"

== Classification leadership table ==
Stage	Winner	General classification	Mountains classification	Points classification	Young rider classification	Teams classification
1	Filippo Ganna	Filippo Ganna	Not awarded	Filippo Ganna	Filippo Ganna	Deceuninck–Quick-Step
2	Eduard Prades	Gorka Izagirre	Lilian Calmejane	Eduard Prades	David Gaudu	Groupama–FDJ
3	Philippe Gilbert	Gorka Izagirre	Dries De Bondt	Simon Clarke	David Gaudu	Groupama–FDJ
4	John Degenkolb	Gorka Izagirre	Lilian Calmejane	Simon Clarke	David Gaudu	Groupama–FDJ
Final		Gorka Izagirre	Lilian Calmejane	Simon Clarke	David Gaudu	Groupama–FDJ
