= 2021 Tour du Finistère =

2021 UCI Europe Tour

Race details
- Dates: 22 May 2021
- Stages: 1
- Distance: 196.3 km (122.0 mi)
- Winning time: 4h 58' 43"

Results
	Winner	Benoît Cosnefroy (FRA)	(AG2R Citroën Team)
	Second	Sean De Bie (BEL)	(Bingoal Pauwels Sauces WB)
	Third	Rasmus Tiller (NOR)	(Uno-X Pro Cycling Team)

The 2021 Tour du Finistère was the 35th edition of the Tour du Finistère road cycling one day race, which was held on 22 May 2021, starting in the town of Saint-Evarzec and finishing in Quimper. It was a category-1.1 event on the 2021 UCI Europe Tour and the fifth event of the 2021 French Road Cycling Cup.

The race was won in a sprint by Benoît Cosnefroy ahead of Sean De Bie and Rasmus Tiller.

== Teams ==
Four UCI WorldTeams, seven UCI ProTeams, and three UCI Continental teams made up the fourteen teams that participated in the race. Each team entered up to seven riders, with some only sending six. 76 of the 89 riders in the race finished.

UCI WorldTeams

- AG2R Citroën Team
- Cofidis
- Groupama–FDJ
- Intermarché–Wanty–Gobert Matériaux

UCI ProTeams

- Arkéa–Samsic
- B&B Hotels p/b KTM
- Bingoal Pauwels Sauces WB
- Delko
- Rally Cycling
- Total Direct Énergie
- Uno-X Pro Cycling Team

UCI Continental Teams

- St. Michel–Auber93
- Tarteletto–Isorex
- Xelliss–Roubaix–Lille Métropole

== Result ==
Result
Rank	Rider	Team	Time
1	Benoît Cosnefroy (FRA)	AG2R Citroën Team	4h 58' 43"
2	Sean De Bie (BEL)	Bingoal Pauwels Sauces WB	+ 0"
3	Rasmus Tiller (NOR)	Uno-X Pro Cycling Team	+ 0"
4	Alexis Vuillermoz (FRA)	Total Direct Énergie	+ 0"
5	Baptiste Planckaert (BEL)	Intermarché–Wanty–Gobert Matériaux	+ 0"
6	Julien Simon (FRA)	Total Direct Énergie	+ 0"
7	Romain Hardy (FRA)	Arkéa–Samsic	+ 0"
8	Jonathan Hivert (FRA)	B&B Hotels p/b KTM	+ 0"
9	Cyril Barthe (FRA)	B&B Hotels p/b KTM	+ 0"
10	Damien Touzé (FRA)	AG2R Citroën Team	+ 0"
