= 2020 La Drôme Classic =

2020 Royal Bernard Drôme Classic
2020 UCI Europe Tour 2020 UCI ProSeries

Race details
- Dates: 1 March 2020
- Stages: 1
- Distance: 203.0 km (126.1 mi)
- Winning time: 5h 17' 11"

Results
	Winner	Simon Clarke (AUS)	(EF Pro Cycling)
	Second	Warren Barguil (FRA)	(Arkéa–Samsic)
	Third	Vincenzo Nibali (ITA)	(Trek–Segafredo)

The 2020 Royal Bernard Drôme Classic was the seventh edition of the La Drôme Classic cycle race. It was held on 1 March 2020 as a category 1.Pro race on the 2020 UCI Europe Tour and 2020 UCI ProSeries. The race started and finished in Livron-sur-Drôme.

The race was won by Australian rider Simon Clarke of EF Pro Cycling, who outsprinted French rider Warren Barguil of Arkéa–Samsic and Italian rider Vincenzo Nibali of Trek–Segafredo.

== Teams ==
Twenty teams were invited to the race. Of these teams, seven are UCI WorldTour teams, twelve are UCI Professional Continental teams, and one is a UCI Continental team. Each team could enter up to seven riders, though many only entered six, including Bingoal–Wallonie Bruxelles, Circus–Wanty Gobert, Deceuninck–Quick-Step, EF Pro Cycling, Riwal Readynez, and Trek–Segafredo. 74 of the 134 riders finished the race.

UCI WorldTeams

- AG2R La Mondiale
- Cofidis
- Deceuninck–Quick-Step
- EF Pro Cycling
- Groupama–FDJ
- NTT Pro Cycling
- Trek–Segafredo

UCI Professional Continental Teams

- Arkéa–Samsic
- Bingoal–Wallonie Bruxelles
- Burgos BH
- B&B Hotels–Vital Concept
- Caja Rural–Seguros RGA
- Circus–Wanty Gobert
- Fundación–Orbea
- Nippo–Delko–One Provence
- Rally Cycling
- Riwal Readynez
- Total Direct Énergie
- Vini Zabù–KTM

UCI Continental Teams

- St. Michel–Auber93

== Result ==
Result
Rank	Rider	Team	Time
1	Simon Clarke (AUS)	EF Pro Cycling	5h 17' 11"
2	Warren Barguil (FRA)	Arkéa–Samsic	+ 0"
3	Vincenzo Nibali (ITA)	Trek–Segafredo	+ 2"
4	Guillaume Martin (FRA)	Cofidis	+ 26"
5	Benoît Cosnefroy (FRA)	AG2R La Mondiale	+ 26"
6	Gonzalo Serrano (ESP)	Caja Rural–Seguros RGA	+ 36"
7	Julien Simon (FRA)	Total Direct Énergie	+ 36"
8	Sean Bennett (USA)	EF Pro Cycling	+ 36"
9	Tanel Kangert (EST)	EF Pro Cycling	+ 36"
10	Lilian Calmejane (FRA)	Total Direct Énergie	+ 36"
