= 2019 La Drôme Classic =

2019 UCI Europe Tour

Race details
- Dates: 3 March 2019
- Stages: 1
- Distance: 207.8 km (129.1 mi)
- Winning time: 5h 06' 04"

Results
	Winner	Alexis Vuillermoz (FRA)	(AG2R La Mondiale)
	Second	Valentin Madouas (FRA)	(Groupama–FDJ)
	Third	Warren Barguil (FRA)	(Trek–Segafredo)

The 2019 La Drôme Classic was the sixth edition of the La Drôme Classic cycle race. It was held on 3 March 2019 as a category 1.1 race on the 2019 UCI Europe Tour. The race started and finished in Livron-sur-Drôme.

The race was won by French rider Alexis Vuillermoz of AG2R La Mondiale, ahead of fellow French riders Valentin Madouas of Groupama–FDJ and Warren Barguil of Arkéa–Samsic.

== Teams ==
Nineteen teams of up to seven riders were invited to the race. Of these teams, two were UCI WorldTour teams, sixteen were UCI Professional Continental teams, and one was a UCI Continental team. 102 of the 128 riders finished the race.

UCI WorldTeams

- AG2R La Mondiale
- Groupama–FDJ

UCI Professional Continental Teams

- Androni Giocattoli–Sidermec
- Arkéa–Samsic
- Cofidis
- Wallonie Bruxelles
- Israel Cycling Academy
- Burgos BH
- Vital Concept–B&B Hotels
- Caja Rural–Seguros RGA
- Wanty–Gobert
- Euskadi–Murias
- Roompot–Charles
- Delko–Marseille Provence
- Rally UHC Cycling
- Riwal Readynez
- Direct Énergie
- Neri Sottoli–Selle Italia–KTM

UCI Continental Teams

- St. Michel–Auber93

== Result ==
Result
Rank	Rider	Team	Time
1	Alexis Vuillermoz (FRA)	AG2R La Mondiale	5h 06' 04"
2	Valentin Madouas (FRA)	Groupama–FDJ	+ 0"
3	Warren Barguil (FRA)	Arkéa–Samsic	+ 3"
4	Emil Vinjebo (DEN)	Riwal Readynez	+ 8"
5	Giovanni Visconti (ITA)	Neri Sottoli–Selle Italia–KTM	+ 13"
6	Arthur Vichot (FRA)	Vital Concept–B&B Hotels	+ 13"
7	Romain Bardet (FRA)	AG2R La Mondiale	+ 13"
8	Guillaume Martin (FRA)	Wanty–Gobert	+ 13"
9	Matteo Busato (ITA)	Androni Giocattoli–Sidermec	+ 13"
10	Kévin Le Cunff (FRA)	St. Michel–Auber93	+ 13"
