= Alexis Vuillermoz =

French road bicycle racer

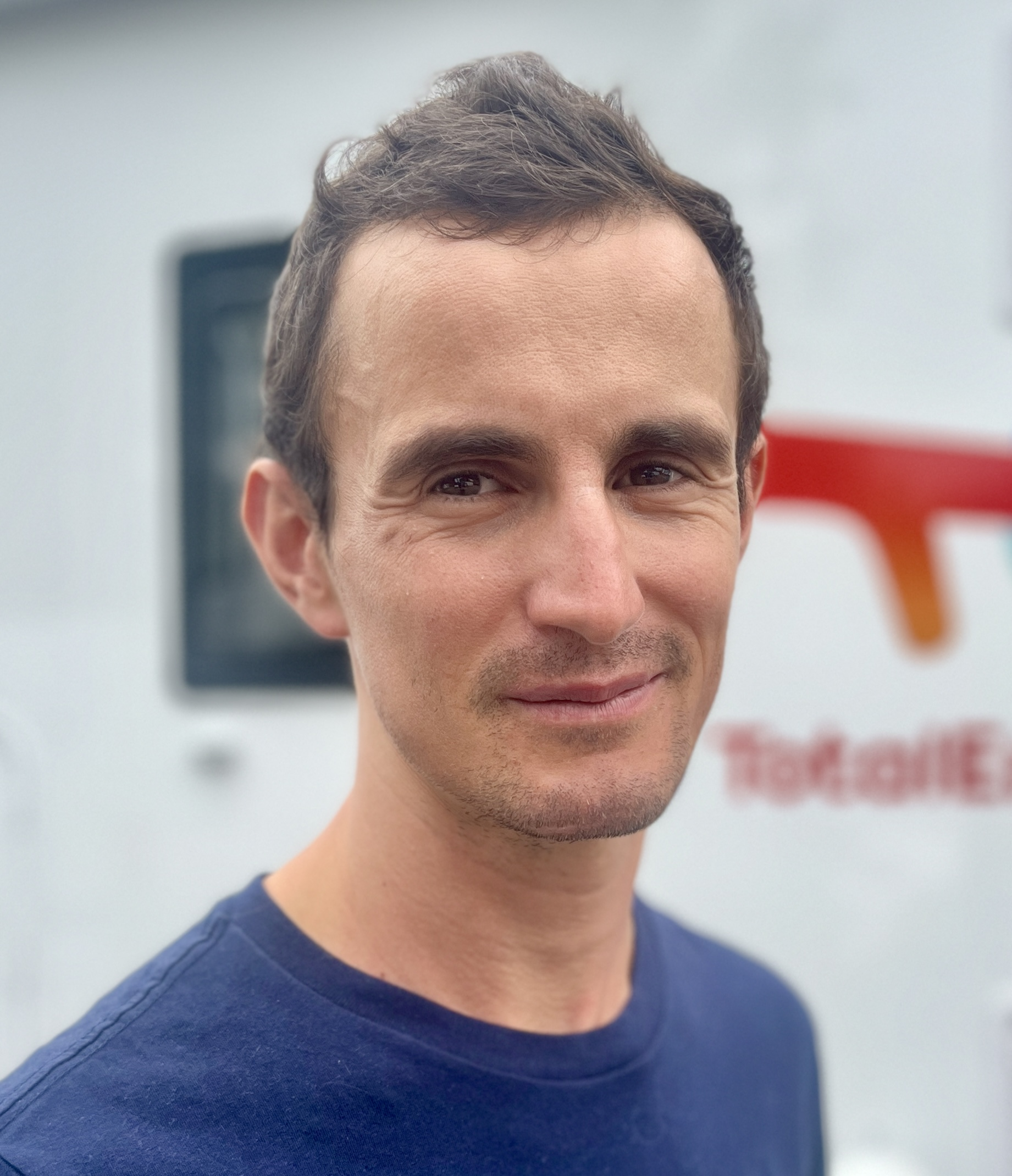
- Vuillermoz at the 2023 Tour de l'Ain

Personal information
- Full name: Alexis Vuillermoz
- Nickname: Pikachu
- Born: 1 June 1988 (age 38) Saint-Claude, Jura, France
- Height: 1.74 m (5 ft 8 1/2 in)
- Weight: 60 kg (132 lb; 9 st 6 lb)

Cycling career
- Sport: Cycling
- Current team: Retired
- Disciplines: Road; Mountain biking
- Role: Rider
- Rider type: Puncheur

Amateur teams
- 2006–2008: Scott–Les 2 Alpes
- 2009–2012: Lapierre International
- 2012: Saur–Sojasun (stagiaire)

Professional teams
- 2013: Sojasun
- 2014–2020: Ag2r–La Mondiale
- 2021–2024: Total Direct Énergie

Major wins
- Grand Tour Tour de France 1 individual stage (2015)

Alexis Vuillermoz (born 1 June 1988) is a French former road bicycle racer, who competed as a professional from 2013 to 2024.

== Career ==
=== Mountain biking (2006–2012) ===
He was originally a mountain bike racer before switching to road cycling, winning the French national under-23 mountain bike title twice and riding as part of the French national team that took the team relay title at the 2008 Mountain Bike World Championships.

=== Sojasun (2013) ===
He was a member of the Sojasun team that competed at the 2013 Tour de France, finishing the race 46th overall.

=== Ag2r–La Mondiale (2014–2020) ===
Vuillermoz joined Ag2r–La Mondiale for the 2014 season, after his previous team – Sojasun – folded at the end of the 2013 season. In the eighth stage of the 2015 Tour de France, Vuillermoz attacked the leading group on the Mûr-de-Bretagne to cross the line solo atop the hill. "After winning I thought about my dad who died three years ago. He was the one who got me interested in the Tour de France, he used to take my cousins and I to the side of the road to watch the Tour go past," said Vuillermoz. "I hope today he's proud of me."

In 2016, Vuillermoz finished in 23rd position in the Olympics men's road race and in 29th position in the Olympic men's road time trial.

He started the 2018 Tour de France, but was forced to abandon with a scapular fracture sustained after colliding with a roadside spectator trying to take a photo in one of the cobbled sectors on stage 9 to Roubaix.

=== Total Direct Énergie (2021–present) ===
In October 2020, Vuillermoz signed an initial two-year contract with the Total Direct Énergie team, from the 2021 season. In his first season with the team, he finished fourth at the Tour du Finistère, and seventh overall at the Tour du Rwanda. During the Tour de Suisse, Vuillermoz crashed during the seventh stage individual time trial, fracturing his pelvis and doctors advised him not to race again.

At the start of the 2022 season, Vuillermoz recorded top-ten finishes in four of his first five race starts, with a best finish of fourth place at the GP Miguel Induráin. Later in the month, he finished third at the Classic Grand Besançon Doubs, and recorded a tenth-place finish in La Flèche Wallonne. That June, Vuillermoz won a stage from the breakaway at the Critérium du Dauphiné, winning a sprint finish of five riders in Brives-Charensac that managed to fend off the peloton by five seconds and assumed the race lead following the stage. Having extended his contract by a further two years in August, Vuillermoz did not return to the podium until October's Gran Piemonte, where he finished in third place.

== Major results ==
=== Mountain bike ===
2005
3rd Team relay, UCI World Championships
3rd Cross-country, National Junior Championships
2006
1st Cross-country, National Junior Championships
2nd Cross-country, UEC European Junior Championships
2008
1st Team relay, UCI World Championships
1st Team relay, UEC European Championships
2009
1st Cross-country, National Under-23 Championships
2nd Cross-country, UCI World Under-23 Championships
2010
1st Cross-country, National Under-23 Championships

=== Road ===
2012
5th Overall Tour des Pays de Savoie
2013
5th Overall Rhône-Alpes Isère Tour
2014 (1 pro win)
1st Mountains classification, Route du Sud
3rd Overall Tour du Gévaudan Languedoc-Roussillon

1st Stage 2

5th Tour du Doubs
8th Overall Critérium International
2015 (3)
1st Grand Prix de Plumelec-Morbihan
1st International Road Cycling Challenge
1st Stage 8 Tour de France
6th Overall Tour du Gévaudan Languedoc-Roussillon

1st Stage 2

6th La Flèche Wallonne
9th Overall Tour du Haut Var
9th Overall Critérium International
2016
2nd Grand Prix de Plumelec-Morbihan
3rd Road race, National Road Championships
5th Overall Critérium International
2017 (3)
1st Overall Tour du Limousin

1st Stage 2

1st Grand Prix de Plumelec-Morbihan
4th Giro di Lombardia
4th Grand Prix Cycliste de Québec
6th Giro dell'Emilia
2018
2nd Overall Tour du Haut Var
4th Classic de l'Ardèche
5th Grand Prix de Plumelec-Morbihan
5th Coppa Sabatini
8th Overall Paris–Nice
2019 (1)
1st La Drôme Classic
4th Overall Tour du Haut Var
7th Classic de l'Ardèche
2021
4th Tour du Finistère
7th Overall Tour du Rwanda
2022 (1)
1st Stage 2 Critérium du Dauphiné
3rd Gran Piemonte
3rd Classic Grand Besançon Doubs
4th GP Miguel Induráin
6th La Drôme Classic
7th Overall Tour des Alpes-Maritimes et du Var
10th Overall Vuelta a Asturias
10th La Flèche Wallonne
10th Ardèche Classic

==== Grand Tour general classification results timeline ====
Grand Tour	2013	2014	2015	2016	2017	2018	2019	2020	2021	2022
Giro d'Italia	—	11	—	—	—	—	29	—	—	—
Tour de France	46	—	26	20	13	DNF	41	35	—	DNF
Vuelta a España	Has not contested during his career									

Legend
—	Did not compete
DNF	Did not finish
