= International Road Cycling Challenge =

2015 UCI America Tour

Race details
- Dates: 16 August 2015
- Stages: 1
- Winning time: 4h 20' 27"

Results
	Winner	Alexis Vuillermoz (France)
	Second	Serge Pauwels (Belgium)
	Third	Romain Bardet (France)

The International Road Cycling Challenge was a one-off, one-day bicycle race that served as one of six Brazilian events in the year-long 2015 UCI America Tour and acted as a test event for the 2016 Summer Olympics. The race was rated a grade of 1.2 and was part of the "Aquece Rio" series of events. The race was run over most of the Olympic course. Most of the riders represented countries instead of trade teams; however, there were several, mainly Brazilian, trade teams in the race. The race was won by French cyclist Alexis Vuillermoz.

== Teams and riders ==
Of 73 starters, only 29 riders finished.

== Result ==
Result
Rank	Rider	Team	Time
1	Alexis Vuillermoz (FRA)	France	4h 20' 27"
2	Serge Pauwels (BEL)	Belgium	+ 22"
3	Romain Bardet (FRA)	France	+ 22"
4	Tony Gallopin (FRA)	France	+ 22"
5	Yuri Trofimov (RUS)	Russia	+ 22"
6	Thibaut Pinot (FRA)	France	+ 24"
7	Kléber Ramos (BRA)	Carrefour Funvic Soul Cycling Team	+ 3' 42"
8	Warren Barguil (FRA)	France	+ 4' 24"
9	Ben Swift (GBR)	Great Britain	+ 6' 56"
10	Simon Clarke (AUS)	Australia	+ 6' 56"
Source: ProCyclingStats
