= 2022 La Flèche Wallonne =

Cycling race

2022 UCI World Tour, race 16 of 32
- Event poster

Race details
- Dates: 20 April 2022
- Stages: 1
- Distance: 202.5 km (125.8 mi)
- Winning time: 4h 42' 12"

Results
	Winner	Dylan Teuns (BEL)	(Team Bahrain Victorious)
	Second	Alejandro Valverde (ESP)	(Movistar Team)
	Third	Aleksandr Vlasov^{[a]}	(Bora–Hansgrohe)

The 2022 La Flèche Wallonne was a road cycling one-day race that took place on 20 April 2022 from the Belgian city of Blegny to the municipality of Huy. It was the 86th edition of La Flèche Wallonne and the 16th event of the 2022 UCI World Tour. It was won for the first time by Dylan Teuns.

== Teams ==
Twenty-five teams were invited to the race, including all eighteen UCI WorldTeams and seven UCI ProTeams.

UCI WorldTeams

- AG2R Citroën Team
- Astana Qazaqstan Team
- Bora–Hansgrohe
- Cofidis
- Quick-Step Alpha Vinyl Team
- EF Education–EasyPost
- Groupama–FDJ
- INEOS Grenadiers
- Intermarché–Wanty–Gobert Matériaux
- Israel–Premier Tech
- Lotto–Soudal
- Movistar Team
- Team Bahrain Victorious
- Team BikeExchange–Jayco
- Team DSM
- Team Jumbo–Visma
- Trek–Segafredo
- UAE Team Emirates

UCI ProTeams

- Alpecin–Fenix
- Arkéa–Samsic
- Bardiani–CSF–Faizanè
- B&B Hotels–KTM
- Bingoal Pauwels Sauces WB
- Sport Vlaanderen–Baloise
- Team TotalEnergies

== Result ==
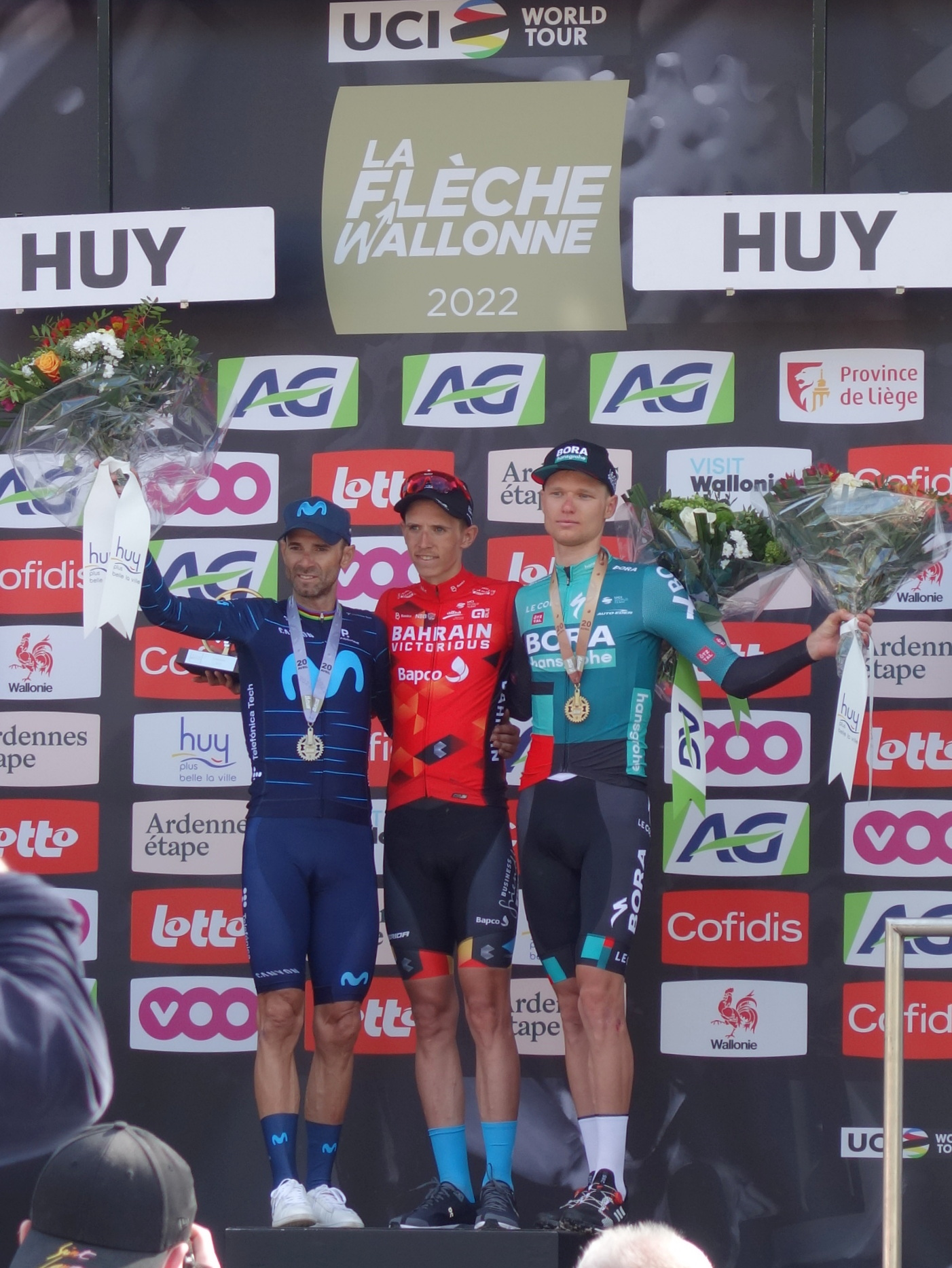
2022 Flèche Wallonne podium: Alejandro Valverde, Dylan Teuns and Aleksandr Vlasov

Result
Rank	Rider	Team	Time
1	Dylan Teuns (BEL)	Team Bahrain Victorious	4h 42' 12"
2	Alejandro Valverde (ESP)	Movistar Team	+ 2"
3	Aleksandr Vlasov^{[a]}	Bora–Hansgrohe	+ 2"
4	Julian Alaphilippe (FRA)	Quick-Step Alpha Vinyl Team	+ 5"
5	Daniel Martínez (COL)	INEOS Grenadiers	+ 7"
6	Michael Woods (CAN)	Israel–Premier Tech	+ 7"
7	Ruben Guerreiro (POR)	EF Education–EasyPost	+ 7"
8	Rudy Molard (FRA)	Groupama–FDJ	+ 7"
9	Warren Barguil (FRA)	Arkéa–Samsic	+ 7"
10	Alexis Vuillermoz (FRA)	Team TotalEnergies	+ 7"

== Notes ==
^{a} As of 1 March 2022, the UCI announced that cyclists from Russia and Belarus would no longer compete under the name or flag of those respective countries due to the Russian invasion of Ukraine.
