= 2022 Brabantse Pijl =

2022 UCI Europe Tour 2022 UCI ProSeries
- Event poster with previous winners Tom Pidcock and Ruth Winder

Race details
- Dates: 13 April 2022
- Stages: 1
- Distance: 205.1 km (127.4 mi)
- Winning time: 4h 53' 21"

Results
	Winner	Magnus Sheffield (USA)	(INEOS Grenadiers)
	Second	Benoît Cosnefroy (FRA)	(AG2R Citroën Team)
	Third	Warren Barguil (FRA)	(Arkéa–Samsic)

The 2022 Brabantse Pijl was the 62nd edition of the Brabantse Pijl cycle race and was held on 13 April 2022. The race covered 205.1 km (127.4 mi), starting in Leuven and finishing in Overijse. Magnus Sheffield of INEOS Grenadiers took the win with a 3.5km solo. As one of the 3 Ineos Grenadiers team riders in it, he attacked from a leading group of 7 and managed to hold them off to the line to take his second career victory.

== Teams ==
Thirteen of the eighteen UCI WorldTeams and eight UCI ProTeams made up the twenty-one teams that participated in the race. Every team entered 7 riders except for; Intermarché–Wanty–Gobert Matériaux, Cofidis, Trek–Segafredo and Bardiani–CSF–Faizanè who started with only 6 riders. And EF Education–EasyPost and B&B Hotels–KTM only started with 5.

UCI WorldTeams

- AG2R Citroën Team
- Bora–Hansgrohe
- Cofidis
- Quick-Step Alpha Vinyl Team
- EF Education–EasyPost
- INEOS Grenadiers
- Intermarché–Wanty–Gobert Matériaux
- Israel–Premier Tech
- Lotto–Soudal
- Team Bahrain Victorious
- Team BikeExchange–Jayco
- Trek–Segafredo
- UAE Team Emirates

UCI ProTeams

- Alpecin–Fenix
- B&B Hotels–KTM
- Bardiani–CSF–Faizanè
- Bingoal Pauwels Sauces WB
- Burgos BH
- Sport Vlaanderen–Baloise
- Arkéa–Samsic
- Uno-X Pro Cycling Team

== Result ==
Result
Rank	Rider	Team	Time
1	Magnus Sheffield (USA)	INEOS Grenadiers	5h 53' 21"
2	Benoît Cosnefroy (FRA)	AG2R Citroën Team	+ 37"
3	Warren Barguil (FRA)	Arkéa–Samsic	+ 37"
4	Ben Turner (GBR)	INEOS Grenadiers	+ 40"
5	Tom Pidcock (GBR)	INEOS Grenadiers	+ 41"
6	Remco Evenepoel (BEL)	Quick-Step Alpha Vinyl Team	+ 41"
7	Michael Matthews (AUS)	Team BikeExchange–Jayco	+ 41"
8	Dylan Teuns (BEL)	Team Bahrain Victorious	+ 41"
9	Tim Wellens (BEL)	Lotto–Soudal	+ 41"
10	Xandro Meurisse (BEL)	Alpecin–Fenix	+ 51"
