= Simon Clarke (cyclist) =

Australian cyclist (born 1986)

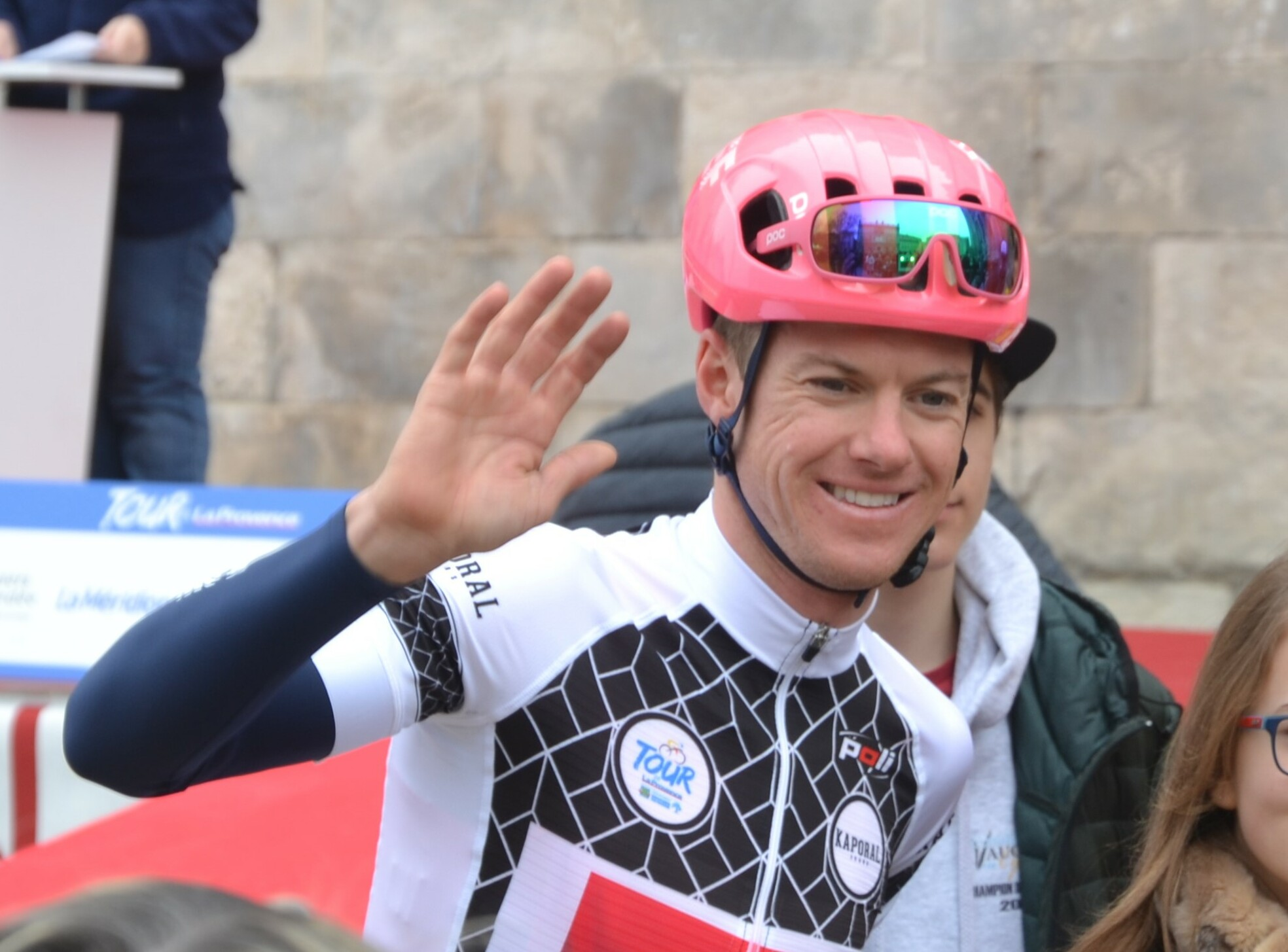
- Clarke at the 2019 Tour de la Provence

Personal information
- Full name: Simon Clarke
- Nickname: Simo
- Born: 18 July 1986 (age 40) Melbourne, Victoria, Australia
- Height: 1.75 m (5 ft 9 in)
- Weight: 63 kg (139 lb)

Cycling career
- Sport: Cycling
- Current team: NSN Cycling Team
- Discipline: Road
- Role: Rider (retired), Coach
- Rider type: Puncheur

Amateur team
- 2006–2008: Southaustralia.com–AIS

Professional teams
- 2009: Amica Chips–Knauf
- 2009–2010: ISD–NERI
- 2011: Astana
- 2012–2015: GreenEDGE
- 2016–2020: Cannondale
- 2021: Team Qhubeka Assos
- 2022–2026: Israel–Premier Tech

Major wins
- Grand Tours Tour de France 1 individual stage (2022) 1 TTT stage (2013) Giro d'Italia 1 TTT stage (2015) Vuelta a España Mountains classification (2012) 2 individual stages (2012, 2018) One-day races and Classics GP Industria & Artigianato di Larciano (2016) La Drôme Classic (2020)

Simon Clarke (born 18 July 1986) is an Australian former professional road racing cyclist, who last rode for UCI WorldTeam NSN Cycling Team. He previously rode for the Astana (2011) and Orica–GreenEDGE (2012–2015) teams in the UCI World Tour. Before turning professional, Clarke competed in track cycling as an Australian Institute of Sport scholarship holder. He is not related to fellow Australian cyclist and past teammate Will Clarke.

After retiring from professional cycling after the 2026 Cadel Evans Great Ocean Road Race, Clarke joined his team's performance staff.

== Professional career ==
At the 2012 Vuelta a España, Clarke won the fourth stage of the race, after being a part of an early breakaway that made it home on the mountainous race. The only other survivor of the break was Omega Pharma–Quick-Step's Tony Martin, whom Clarke out sprinted to claim his first professional victory. During the twentieth stage, Clarke placed first at the first three of five categorised climbs, to win the most combative rider for the stage and to secure himself the blue polka-dot jersey, as winner of the mountains classification.

In September 2015, it was announced that Clarke would join Cannondale for the 2016 season. He was added to Australia's roster for the 2016 Summer Olympics, replacing Simon Gerrans (Orica–GreenEDGE), who had crashed out of the Tour de France.

In November 2020, it was announced that Clarke would join the Team Qhubeka Assos team for the 2021 season. Clarke won the fifth stage of the 2022 Tour de France. He joined the winning breakaway group on a stage that included eleven sections of cobbles, many of which were unfamiliar sections that had never been used in the Tour or Paris–Roubaix. As the third week began he was forced to quit the Tour for the first time in his career, due to a positive COVID test.

In 2024, Australian pro-Palestinian protesters disrupted Clarke during the Australian National Championships because of his affiliation with Israel–Premier Tech.

== Major results ==
2004
1st Team pursuit, UCI Junior Track World Championships
2005
5th Gran Premio Industrie del Marmo
8th Melbourne to Warrnambool Classic
10th Overall Giro delle Regioni
2006
1st Madison, National Junior Track Championships
4th Overall Giro delle Regioni
5th Trofeo Città di Brescia
7th Overall Vuelta a Navarra

1st Stage 4

8th Overall Herald Sun Tour
8th Overall Tour Down Under
9th Overall Thüringen Rundfahrt der U23
2007
2nd Gran Premio Palio del Recioto
3rd Road race, National Under-23 Road Championships
3rd Down Under Classic
3rd GP Liberazione
6th Overall Tour of Britain
7th Overall Herald Sun Tour

1st Young rider classification

7th Overall Circuito Montañés
8th Giro del Mendrisiotto
8th GP Capodarco
10th Overall Tour Down Under

1st Young rider classification

2008
1st Road race, National Under-23 Road Championships
1st Trofeo Città di San Vendemiano
1st Stage 4 Tour of Japan
2nd GP Capodarco
2nd La Côte Picarde
2nd Trofeo Alcide Degasperi
4th Ronde Van Vlaanderen Beloften
6th Overall Tour of Ireland
7th Trofeo Città di Castelfidardo
2009
8th Overall Tour of Britain
8th Gran Premio dell'Insubria-Lugano
8th Trofeo Laigueglia
10th Memorial Cimurri
2010
4th GP Industria & Artigianato di Larciano
2011
5th Coppa Ugo Agostoni
5th Tre Valli Varesine
7th Giro del Friuli
7th Vattenfall Cyclassics
10th Grand Prix Cycliste de Québec
2012 (1 pro win)
Vuelta a España

1st Mountains classification
1st Stage 4

2nd Overall Tour of Norway
2nd Rogaland GP
5th Overall Tour du Haut Var
7th Japan Cup
2013
1st Stage 4 (TTT) Tour de France
7th Road race, UCI Road World Championships
2014 (2)
1st Overall Herald Sun Tour

1st Stage 2

4th Gran Premio Città di Camaiore
2015
Giro d'Italia

1st Stage 1 (TTT)
Held after Stage 4

2nd Cadel Evans Great Ocean Road Race
4th Overall Herald Sun Tour
10th International Road Cycling Challenge
10th Prueba Villafranca de Ordizia
2016 (1)
1st GP Industria & Artigianato di Larciano
2017
6th GP Industria & Artigianato di Larciano
2018 (1)
1st Stage 5 Vuelta a España
8th Overall Vuelta a Andalucía
2019
2nd Overall Tour de la Provence

1st Points classification

2nd Amstel Gold Race
8th Overall Tirreno–Adriatico
8th Strade Bianche
9th Overall BinckBank Tour
9th Milan–San Remo
2020 (1)
1st La Drôme Classic
2021
5th La Drôme Classic
5th Primus Classic
8th Strade Bianche
2022 (1)
1st Stage 5 Tour de France
3rd GP Miguel Induráin
3rd Trofeo Serra de Tramuntana
5th Trofeo Calvià
6th Trofeo Pollença–Port d'Andratx
2023
2nd Road race, National Road Championships
2nd Vuelta a Murcia
3rd Cadel Evans Great Ocean Road Race
5th Dwars door het Hageland
8th La Drôme Classic
Combativity award Stage 6 Giro d'Italia
2024
6th Overall Tour de Wallonie

=== Grand Tour general classification results timeline ===
Grand Tour	2012	2013	2014	2015	2016	2017	2018	2019	2020	2021	2022	2023	2024	2025
Giro d'Italia	—	—	—	63	67	—	—	—	75	—	—	DNF	97	117
Tour de France	—	68	113	—	—	86	100	61	—	123	DNF	109	—	—
Vuelta a España	77	69	70	—	DNF	74	46	—	—	—	—	—	—	—

Legend
—	Did not compete
DSQ	Disqualified
DNF	Did not finish
IP	In progress
