= 2022 Grand Prix Cycliste de Montréal =

One-day cycling race in Canada

2022 UCI World Tour, race 30 of 31
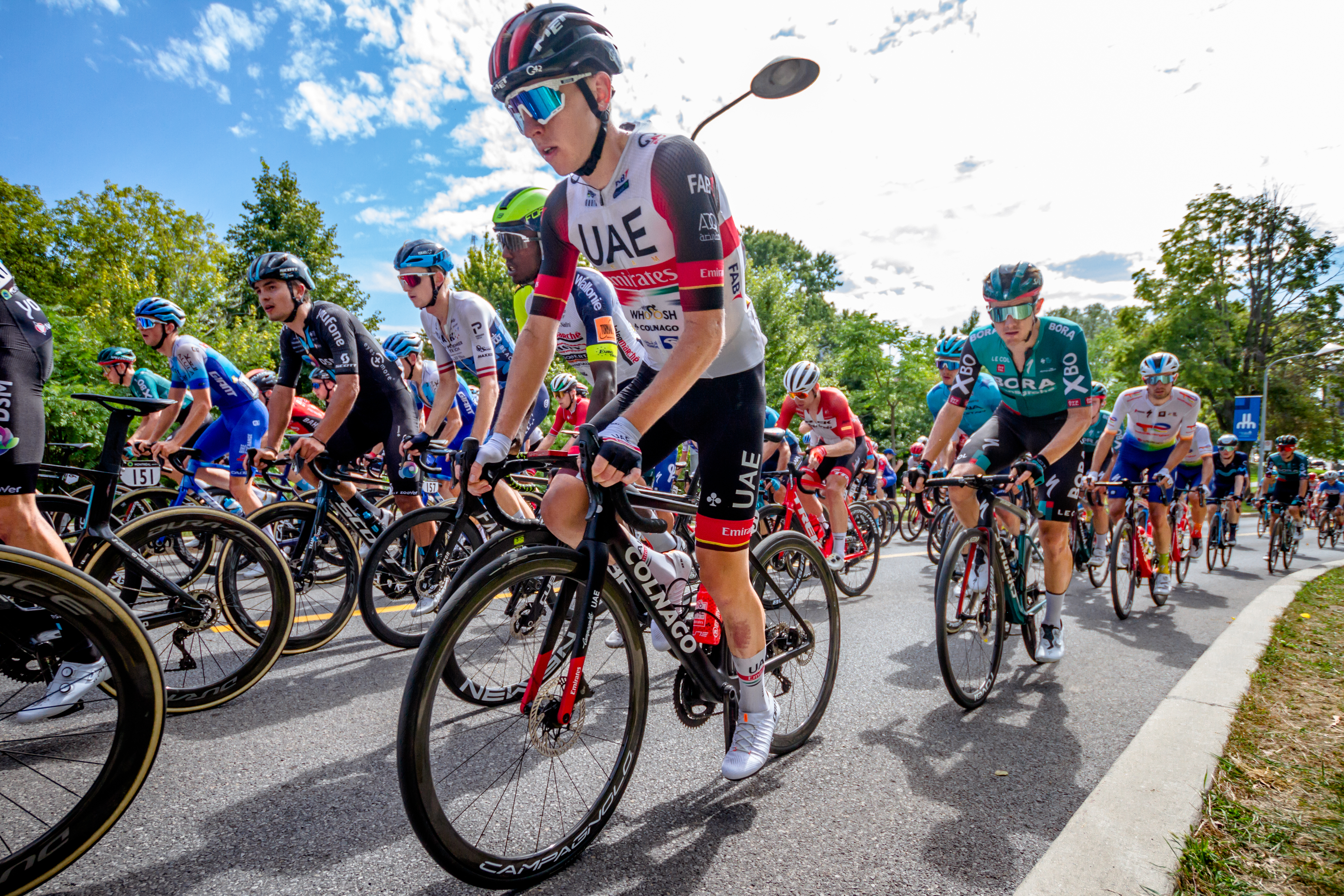
- Winner Tadej Pogačar in the peloton during the race

Race details
- Dates: 11 September 2022
- Stages: 1
- Distance: 221.4 km (137.6 mi)
- Winning time: 5h 59' 38"

Results
	Winner	Tadej Pogačar (SLO)	(UAE Team Emirates)
	Second	Wout van Aert (BEL)	(Team Jumbo–Visma)
	Third	Andrea Bagioli (ITA)	(Quick-Step Alpha Vinyl Team)

The 2022 Grand Prix Cycliste de Montréal was a road cycling one-day race that took place on 11 September 2022 in Montreal, Canada. It was the 11th edition of the Grand Prix Cycliste de Montréal and the 30th event of the 2022 UCI World Tour.

Returning to the UCI World Tour for the first time since 2019, the race was won by Slovenian rider Tadej Pogačar of UAE Team Emirates in a sprint finish of five riders.

== Teams ==
All eighteen UCI WorldTeams, two UCI ProTeams, and the Canadian national team made up the twenty-one teams that participated in the race.

UCI WorldTeams

- AG2R Citroën Team
- Astana Qazaqstan Team
- Bora–Hansgrohe
- Cofidis
- EF Education–EasyPost
- Groupama–FDJ
- INEOS Grenadiers
- Intermarché–Wanty–Gobert Matériaux
- Israel–Premier Tech
- Lotto–Soudal
- Movistar Team
- Quick-Step Alpha Vinyl Team
- Team Bahrain Victorious
- Team BikeExchange–Jayco
- Team DSM
- Team Jumbo–Visma
- Trek–Segafredo
- UAE Team Emirates

UCI ProTeams

- Arkéa–Samsic
- Team TotalEnergies

National Teams

- Canada

== Course ==
The race used a hilly 12.3 kilometres (7.6 mi) circuit around Mount Royal, with the longest climb being Côte Camilien-Houde (1.8 km long and 8% average grade). 18 laps of the circuit made the race 221.4 kilometres (137.6 mi) in length, with 4,842 metres (15,886 ft) of cumulative climbing during the race. This is similar to that found in a mountain stage in the Tour de France, though at a lower altitude.

== Result ==
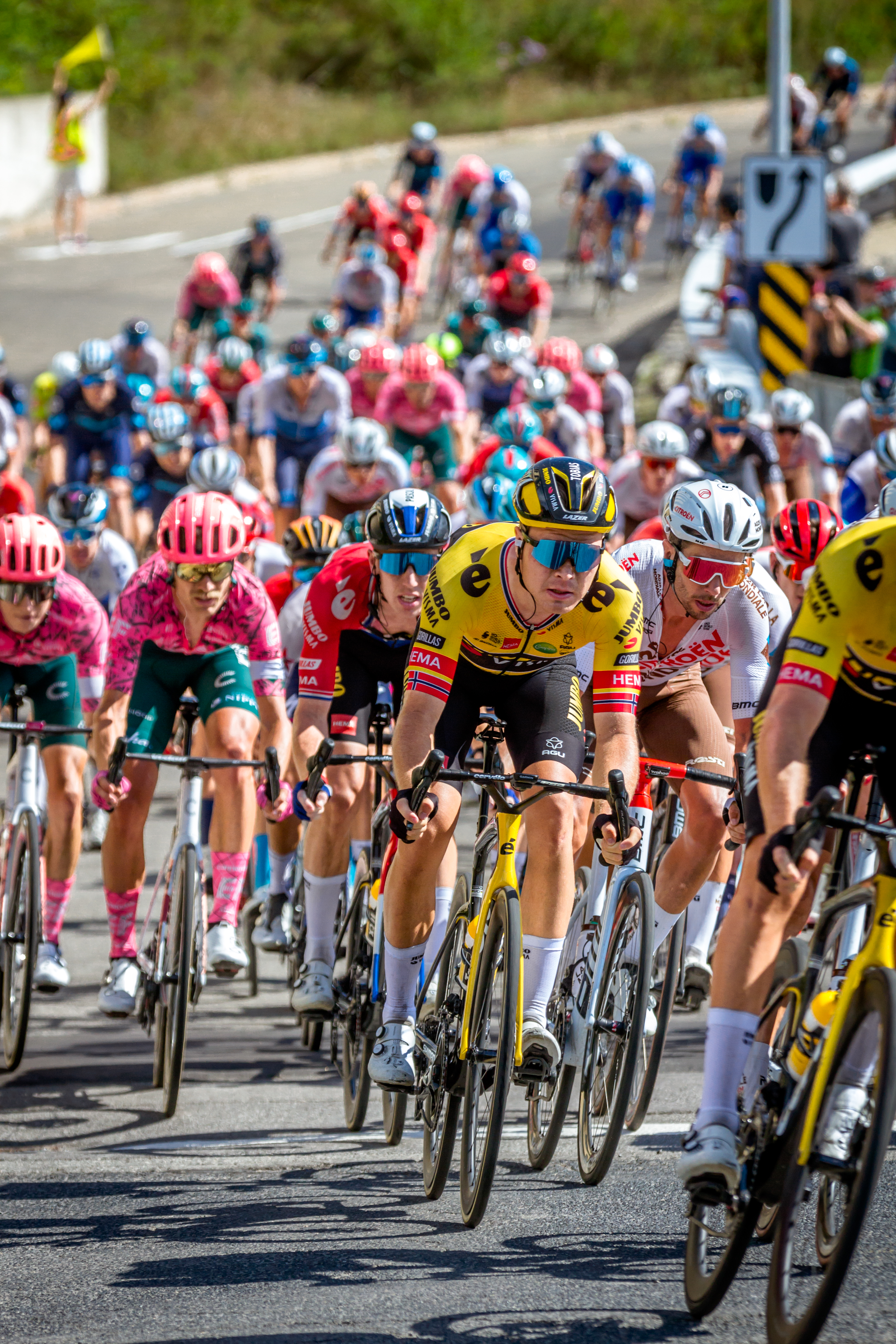
The peloton during the race

Result
Rank	Rider	Team	Time
1	Tadej Pogačar (SLO)	UAE Team Emirates	5h 59' 38"
2	Wout van Aert (BEL)	Team Jumbo–Visma	+ 0"
3	Andrea Bagioli (ITA)	Quick-Step Alpha Vinyl Team	+ 0"
4	Adam Yates (GBR)	INEOS Grenadiers	+ 0"
5	David Gaudu (FRA)	Groupama–FDJ	+ 0"
6	Mauro Schmid (SUI)	Quick-Step Alpha Vinyl Team	+ 22"
7	Giovanni Aleotti (ITA)	Bora–Hansgrohe	+ 22"
8	Romain Bardet (FRA)	Team DSM	+ 22"
9	Pello Bilbao (ESP)	Team Bahrain Victorious	+ 28"
10	Warren Barguil (FRA)	Arkéa–Samsic	+ 31"
