= 2022 Grand Prix de Wallonie =

2022 UCI Europe Tour 2022 UCI ProSeries
- Event poster with previous winner Christophe Laporte

Race details
- Dates: 14 September 2022
- Stages: 1
- Distance: 199.7 km (124.1 mi)
- Winning time: 4h 55' 26"

Results
| | Winner | Mathieu van der Poel (NED) | (Alpecin–Deceuninck) |
| | Second | Biniam Girmay (ERI) | (Intermarché–Wanty–Gobert Matériaux) |
| | Third | Gonzalo Serrano (ESP) | (Movistar Team) |

The 2022 Grand Prix de Wallonie was the 62nd edition of the Grand Prix de Wallonie road cycling one day race, which was held on 14 September 2022 as part of the 2022 UCI ProSeries calendar.

== Teams ==
Eight of the 19 UCI WorldTeams, seven UCI ProTeams, and five UCI Continental teams made up the twenty teams that participated in the race. All but three teams entered a full squad of seven riders; these three teams were Cofidis, Hagens Berman Axeon, Tarteletto–Isorex and they each entered six riders. In total, 137 riders started the race, of which 133 finished.

UCI WorldTeams

- AG2R Citroën Team
- Cofidis
- EF Education–EasyPost
- Intermarché–Wanty–Gobert Matériaux
- Israel–Premier Tech
- Lotto–Soudal
- Movistar Team
- Team BikeExchange–Jayco

UCI ProTeams

- Alpecin–Deceuninck
- Arkéa–Samsic
- B&B Hotels–KTM
- Bingoal Pauwels Sauces WB
- Sport Vlaanderen–Baloise
- Team TotalEnergies
- Uno-X Pro Cycling Team

UCI Continental Teams

- Hagens Berman Axeon
- Saris Rouvy Sauerland Team
- Go Sport–Roubaix–Lille Métropole
- Minerva Cycling Team
- Tarteletto–Isorex

== Result ==
Result
| Rank | Rider | Team | Time |
|---|---|---|---|
| 1 | Mathieu van der Poel (NED) | Alpecin–Deceuninck | 4h 55' 26" |
| 2 | Biniam Girmay (ERI) | Intermarché–Wanty–Gobert Matériaux | + 0" |
| 3 | Gonzalo Serrano (ESP) | Movistar Team | + 0" |
| 4 | Dylan Teuns (BEL) | Israel–Premier Tech | + 1" |
| 5 | Corbin Strong (NZL) | Israel–Premier Tech | + 1" |
| 6 | Jasper Philipsen (BEL) | Alpecin–Deceuninck | + 1" |
| 7 | Marijn van den Berg (NED) | EF Education–EasyPost | + 1" |
| 8 | Axel Zingle (FRA) | Cofidis | + 1" |
| 9 | Jasper De Buyst (BEL) | Lotto–Soudal | + 1" |
| 10 | Warren Barguil (FRA) | Arkéa–Samsic | + 1" |
