= 2022 Gran Piemonte =

2022 UCI ProSeries

Race details
- Dates: October 6
- Stages: 1
- Distance: 198 km (123.0 mi)
- Winning time: 4h 21' 44"

Results
	Winner	Iván García Cortina (ESP)	(Movistar Team)
	Second	Matej Mohorič (SLO)	(Team Bahrain Victorious)
	Third	Alexis Vuillermoz (FRA)	(Team TotalEnergies)

The 2022 Gran Piemonte was the 106th edition of the Gran Piemonte (known as Giro del Piemonte until 2009) single-day cycling race. It was held on 6 October 2022, over a distance of 198 km, starting in Omegna and ending in Beinasco.

The race was won by Iván García Cortina of Movistar Team.

== Teams ==
16 of the 18 UCI WorldTeams and seven UCI ProTeams made up the 23 teams that participated in the race. In total, 156 riders started the race, of which 144 finished.

UCI WorldTeams

- Astana Qazaqstan Team
- Bora–Hansgrohe
- Cofidis
- EF Education–EasyPost
- Groupama–FDJ
- Ineos Grenadiers
- Intermarché–Wanty–Gobert Matériaux
- Israel–Premier Tech
- Lotto–Soudal
- Movistar Team
- Team Bahrain Victorious
- Team BikeExchange–Jayco
- Team DSM
- Team Jumbo–Visma
- Trek–Segafredo
- UAE Team Emirates

UCI ProTeams

- Alpecin–Deceuninck
- Bardiani–CSF–Faizanè
- Bingoal Pauwels Sauces WB
- Caja Rural–Seguros RGA
- Drone Hopper–Androni Giocattoli
- Eolo–Kometa
- Team TotalEnergies

== Results ==
Result
Rank	Rider	Team	Time
1	Iván García Cortina (ESP)	Movistar Team	4h 21' 44"
2	Matej Mohorič (SLO)	Team Bahrain Victorious	+ 0"
3	Alexis Vuillermoz (FRA)	Team TotalEnergies	+ 0"
4	Edoardo Zambanini (ITA)	Team Bahrain Victorious	+ 0"
5	Alberto Bettiol (ITA)	EF Education–EasyPost	+ 0"
6	Madis Mihkels (EST)	Intermarché–Wanty–Gobert Matériaux	+ 0"
7	Corbin Strong (NZL)	Israel–Premier Tech	+ 0"
8	Andrea Bagioli (ITA)	Quick-Step Alpha Vinyl Team	+ 0"
9	Alessandro Covi (ITA)	UAE Team Emirates	+ 0"
10	Frederik Wandahl (DEN)	Bora–Hansgrohe	+ 0"
