= 2022 Tirreno–Adriatico =

Italian cycling race

2022 UCI World Tour, race 5 of 32

Race details
- Dates: 7–13 March 2022
- Stages: 7
- Distance: 1,133.9 km (704.6 mi)
- Winning time: 27h 25' 56"

Results
Jersey awarded to the overall winner	Winner	Tadej Pogačar (SLO)	(UAE Team Emirates)
	Second	Jonas Vingegaard (DEN)	(Team Jumbo–Visma)
	Third	Mikel Landa (ESP)	(Team Bahrain Victorious)
Jersey awarded to the points classification winner	Points	Tadej Pogačar (SLO)	(UAE Team Emirates)
Jersey awarded to the mountains classification winner	Mountains	Quinn Simmons (USA)	(Trek–Segafredo)
Jersey awarded to the young rider classification winner	Young rider	Tadej Pogačar (SLO)	(UAE Team Emirates)
	Team	Team Bahrain Victorious	

The 2022 Tirreno–Adriatico was a road cycling stage race that took between 7 and 13 March 2022 in Italy. It was the 57th edition of Tirreno–Adriatico and the fifth race of the 2022 UCI World Tour.

== Teams ==
All 18 UCI WorldTeams and six UCI ProTeams made up the 24 teams that participated in the race. Cofidis, with six riders, was the only team to not enter a full squad of seven riders.

A wave of flu-like symptoms, although with no positive COVID-19 test results, resulted in an unusually high attrition rate as many riders were forced to withdraw from the race. Of the 167 riders who started the race, 143 finished.

UCI WorldTeams

- AG2R Citroën Team
- Astana Qazaqstan Team
- Bora–Hansgrohe
- Cofidis
- EF Education–EasyPost
- Groupama–FDJ
- INEOS Grenadiers
- Intermarché–Wanty–Gobert Matériaux
- Israel–Premier Tech
- Lotto–Soudal
- Movistar Team
- Quick-Step Alpha Vinyl Team
- Team Bahrain Victorious
- Team BikeExchange–Jayco
- Team DSM
- Team Jumbo–Visma
- Trek–Segafredo
- UAE Team Emirates

UCI ProTeams

- Alpecin–Fenix
- Arkéa–Samsic
- Bardiani–CSF–Faizanè
- Drone Hopper–Androni Giocattoli
- Eolo–Kometa
- Team TotalEnergies

== Route ==
Stage characteristics and winners
Stage	Date	Course	Distance	Type	Stage winner
1	7 March	Lido di Camaiore	13.9 km (8.6 mi)	Individual time trial	Filippo Ganna (ITA)
2	8 March	Camaiore to Sovicille	219 km (136 mi)	Flat stage	Tim Merlier (BEL)
3	9 March	Murlo to Terni	170 km (110 mi)	Hilly stage	Caleb Ewan (AUS)
4	10 March	Cascata delle Marmore to Bellante	202 km (126 mi)	Intermediate stage	Tadej Pogačar (SLO)
5	11 March	Sefro to Fermo	155 km (96 mi)	Hilly stage	Warren Barguil (FRA)
6	12 March	Apecchio to Carpegna	215 km (134 mi)	Mountain stage	Tadej Pogačar (SLO)
7	13 March	San Benedetto del Tronto to San Benedetto del Tronto	159 km (99 mi)	Flat stage	Phil Bauhaus (GER)
Total			1,133.9 km (704.6 mi)		

== Stages ==
=== Stage 1 ===
7 March 2022 — Lido di Camaiore, 13.9 km (8.6 mi) (ITT)

Stage 1 Result (1–10)
Rank	Rider	Team	Time
1	Filippo Ganna (ITA)	INEOS Grenadiers	15' 17"
2	Remco Evenepoel (BEL)	Quick-Step Alpha Vinyl Team	+ 11"
3	Tadej Pogačar (SLO)	UAE Team Emirates	+ 18"
4	Kasper Asgreen (DEN)	Quick-Step Alpha Vinyl Team	+ 24"
5	Alex Dowsett (GBR)	Israel–Premier Tech	+ 25"
6	Thymen Arensman (NED)	Team DSM	+ 28"
7	Tobias Ludvigsson (SWE)	Groupama–FDJ	+ 32"
8	Jos van Emden (NED)	Team Jumbo–Visma	+ 33"
9	Mikkel Bjerg (DEN)	UAE Team Emirates	+ 39"
10	Matteo Sobrero (ITA)	Team BikeExchange–Jayco	+ 39"

General classification after Stage 1 (1–10)
Rank	Rider	Team	Time
1	Filippo Ganna (ITA)	INEOS Grenadiers	15' 17"
2	Remco Evenepoel (BEL)	Quick-Step Alpha Vinyl Team	+ 11"
3	Tadej Pogačar (SLO)	UAE Team Emirates	+ 18"
4	Kasper Asgreen (DEN)	Quick-Step Alpha Vinyl Team	+ 24"
5	Alex Dowsett (GBR)	Israel–Premier Tech	+ 25"
6	Thymen Arensman (NED)	Team DSM	+ 28"
7	Tobias Ludvigsson (SWE)	Groupama–FDJ	+ 32"
8	Jos van Emden (NED)	Team Jumbo–Visma	+ 33"
9	Mikkel Bjerg (DEN)	UAE Team Emirates	+ 39"
10	Matteo Sobrero (ITA)	Team BikeExchange–Jayco	+ 39"

=== Stage 2 ===
8 March 2022 — Camaiore to Sovicille, 219 km (136 mi)

Stage 2 Result (1–10)
Rank	Rider	Team	Time
1	Tim Merlier (BEL)	Alpecin–Fenix	5h 25' 23"
2	Olav Kooij (NED)	Team Jumbo–Visma	+ 0"
3	Kaden Groves (AUS)	Team BikeExchange–Jayco	+ 0"
4	Peter Sagan (SVK)	Team TotalEnergies	+ 0"
5	Simone Consonni (ITA)	Cofidis	+ 0"
6	Phil Bauhaus (GER)	Team Bahrain Victorious	+ 0"
7	Davide Ballerini (ITA)	Quick-Step Alpha Vinyl Team	+ 0"
8	Giacomo Nizzolo (ITA)	Israel–Premier Tech	+ 0"
9	Jacopo Guarnieri (ITA)	Groupama–FDJ	+ 0"
10	Andrea Vendrame (ITA)	AG2R Citroën Team	+ 0"

General classification after Stage 2 (1–10)
Rank	Rider	Team	Time
1	Filippo Ganna (ITA)	INEOS Grenadiers	5h 40' 40"
2	Remco Evenepoel (BEL)	Quick-Step Alpha Vinyl Team	+ 11"
3	Tadej Pogačar (SLO)	UAE Team Emirates	+ 17"
4	Kasper Asgreen (DEN)	Quick-Step Alpha Vinyl Team	+ 24"
5	Alex Dowsett (GBR)	Israel–Premier Tech	+ 25"
6	Thymen Arensman (NED)	Team DSM	+ 28"
7	Tobias Ludvigsson (SWE)	Groupama–FDJ	+ 32"
8	Jos van Emden (NED)	Team Jumbo–Visma	+ 33"
9	Matteo Sobrero (ITA)	Team BikeExchange–Jayco	+ 39"
10	Lawson Craddock (USA)	Team BikeExchange–Jayco	+ 39"

=== Stage 3 ===
9 March 2022 — Murlo to Terni, 170 km (110 mi)

Stage 3 Result (1–10)
Rank	Rider	Team	Time
1	Caleb Ewan (AUS)	Lotto–Soudal	4h 07' 24"
2	Arnaud Démare (FRA)	Groupama–FDJ	+ 0"
3	Olav Kooij (NED)	Team Jumbo–Visma	+ 0"
4	Nacer Bouhanni (FRA)	Arkéa–Samsic	+ 0"
5	Tim Merlier (BEL)	Alpecin–Fenix	+ 0"
6	Pascal Ackermann (GER)	UAE Team Emirates	+ 0"
7	Phil Bauhaus (GER)	Team Bahrain Victorious	+ 0"
8	Simone Consonni (ITA)	Cofidis	+ 0"
9	Elia Viviani (ITA)	INEOS Grenadiers	+ 0"
10	Matteo Moschetti (ITA)	Trek–Segafredo	+ 0"

General classification after Stage 3 (1–10)
Rank	Rider	Team	Time
1	Filippo Ganna (ITA)	INEOS Grenadiers	9h 48' 04"
2	Remco Evenepoel (BEL)	Quick-Step Alpha Vinyl Team	+ 11"
3	Tadej Pogačar (SLO)	UAE Team Emirates	+ 14"
4	Kasper Asgreen (DEN)	Quick-Step Alpha Vinyl Team	+ 24"
5	Alex Dowsett (GBR)	Israel–Premier Tech	+ 25"
6	Thymen Arensman (NED)	Team DSM	+ 28"
7	Tobias Ludvigsson (SWE)	Groupama–FDJ	+ 32"
8	Jos van Emden (NED)	Team Jumbo–Visma	+ 33"
9	Matteo Sobrero (ITA)	Team BikeExchange–Jayco	+ 39"
10	Lawson Craddock (USA)	Team BikeExchange–Jayco	+ 39"

=== Stage 4 ===
10 March 2022 — Cascata delle Marmore to Bellante, 202 km (126 mi)

Stage 4 Result (1–10)
Rank	Rider	Team	Time
1	Tadej Pogačar (SLO)	UAE Team Emirates	4h 48' 39"
2	Jonas Vingegaard (DEN)	Team Jumbo–Visma	+ 2"
3	Victor Lafay (FRA)	Cofidis	+ 2"
4	Remco Evenepoel (BEL)	Quick-Step Alpha Vinyl Team	+ 2"
5	Giulio Ciccone (ITA)	Trek–Segafredo	+ 5"
6	Tao Geoghegan Hart (GBR)	INEOS Grenadiers	+ 5"
7	Enric Mas (ESP)	Movistar Team	+ 5"
8	Wilco Kelderman (NED)	Bora–Hansgrohe	+ 5"
9	Mikel Landa (ESP)	Team Bahrain Victorious	+ 5"
10	Jai Hindley (AUS)	Bora–Hansgrohe	+ 5"

General classification after Stage 4 (1–10)
Rank	Rider	Team	Time
1	Tadej Pogačar (SLO)	UAE Team Emirates	14h 36' 47"
2	Remco Evenepoel (BEL)	Quick-Step Alpha Vinyl Team	+ 9"
3	Filippo Ganna (ITA)	INEOS Grenadiers	+ 21"
4	Thymen Arensman (NED)	Team DSM	+ 36"
5	Tao Geoghegan Hart (GBR)	INEOS Grenadiers	+ 43"
6	Jonas Vingegaard (DEN)	Team Jumbo–Visma	+ 45"
7	Miguel Ángel López (COL)	Astana Qazaqstan Team	+ 50"
8	Marc Soler (ESP)	UAE Team Emirates	+ 56"
9	Richie Porte (AUS)	INEOS Grenadiers	+ 1' 02"
10	Wilco Kelderman (NED)	Bora–Hansgrohe	+ 1' 04"

=== Stage 5 ===
11 March 2022 — Sefro to Fermo, 155 km (96 mi)

Stage 5 Result (1–10)
Rank	Rider	Team	Time
1	Warren Barguil (FRA)	Arkéa–Samsic	3h 39' 53"
2	Xandro Meurisse (BEL)	Alpecin–Fenix	+ 10"
3	Simone Velasco (ITA)	Astana Qazaqstan Team	+ 14"
4	Nelson Oliveira (POR)	Movistar Team	+ 15"
5	Richie Porte (AUS)	INEOS Grenadiers	+ 26"
6	Tadej Pogačar (SLO)	UAE Team Emirates	+ 28"
7	Jonas Vingegaard (DEN)	Team Jumbo–Visma	+ 28"
8	Enric Mas (ESP)	Movistar Team	+ 28"
9	Remco Evenepoel (BEL)	Quick-Step Alpha Vinyl Team	+ 28"
10	Jai Hindley (AUS)	Bora–Hansgrohe	+ 28"

General classification after Stage 5 (1–10)
Rank	Rider	Team	Time
1	Tadej Pogačar (SLO)	UAE Team Emirates	18h 17' 08"
2	Remco Evenepoel (BEL)	Quick-Step Alpha Vinyl Team	+ 9"
3	Thymen Arensman (NED)	Team DSM	+ 43"
4	Jonas Vingegaard (DEN)	Team Jumbo–Visma	+ 45"
5	Miguel Ángel López (COL)	Astana Qazaqstan Team	+ 1' 00"
6	Richie Porte (AUS)	INEOS Grenadiers	+ 1' 00"
7	Tao Geoghegan Hart (GBR)	INEOS Grenadiers	+ 1' 02"
8	Jai Hindley (AUS)	Bora–Hansgrohe	+ 1' 06"
9	Enric Mas (ESP)	Movistar Team	+ 1' 11"
10	Wilco Kelderman (NED)	Bora–Hansgrohe	+ 1' 14"

=== Stage 6 ===
12 March 2022 — Apecchio to Carpegna, 215 km (134 mi)

Stage 6 Result (1–10)
Rank	Rider	Team	Time
1	Tadej Pogačar (SLO)	UAE Team Emirates	5h 28' 57"
2	Jonas Vingegaard (DEN)	Team Jumbo–Visma	+ 1' 03"
3	Mikel Landa (ESP)	Team Bahrain Victorious	+ 1' 03"
4	Richie Porte (AUS)	INEOS Grenadiers	+ 1' 34"
5	Damiano Caruso (ITA)	Team Bahrain Victorious	+ 1' 49"
6	Jai Hindley (AUS)	Bora–Hansgrohe	+ 1' 49"
7	Thibaut Pinot (FRA)	Groupama–FDJ	+ 1' 49"
8	Giulio Ciccone (ITA)	Trek–Segafredo	+ 2' 23"
9	Pello Bilbao (ESP)	Team Bahrain Victorious	+ 2' 23"
10	Thymen Arensman (NED)	Team DSM	+ 2' 23"

General classification after Stage 6 (1–10)
Rank	Rider	Team	Time
1	Tadej Pogačar (SLO)	UAE Team Emirates	23h 45' 55"
2	Jonas Vingegaard (DEN)	Team Jumbo–Visma	+ 1' 52"
3	Mikel Landa (ESP)	Team Bahrain Victorious	+ 2' 33"
4	Richie Porte (AUS)	INEOS Grenadiers	+ 2' 44"
5	Jai Hindley (AUS)	Bora–Hansgrohe	+ 3' 05"
6	Thymen Arensman (NED)	Team DSM	+ 3' 16"
7	Damiano Caruso (ITA)	Team Bahrain Victorious	+ 3' 20"
8	Thibaut Pinot (FRA)	Groupama–FDJ	+ 3' 37"
9	Pello Bilbao (ESP)	Team Bahrain Victorious	+ 3' 51"
10	Giulio Ciccone (ITA)	Trek–Segafredo	+ 4' 03"

=== Stage 7 ===
13 March 2022 — San Benedetto del Tronto to San Benedetto del Tronto, 159 km (99 mi)

Stage 7 Result (1–10)
Rank	Rider	Team	Time
1	Phil Bauhaus (GER)	Team Bahrain Victorious	3h 39' 58"
2	Giacomo Nizzolo (ITA)	Israel–Premier Tech	+ 0"
3	Kaden Groves (AUS)	Team BikeExchange–Jayco	+ 0"
4	Davide Cimolai (ITA)	Cofidis	+ 0"
5	Alberto Dainese (ITA)	Team DSM	+ 0"
6	Alexander Kristoff (NOR)	Intermarché–Wanty–Gobert Matériaux	+ 0"
7	Edvald Boasson Hagen (NOR)	Team TotalEnergies	+ 0"
8	Olav Kooij (NED)	Team Jumbo–Visma	+ 0"
9	Arnaud Démare (FRA)	Groupama–FDJ	+ 0"
10	Matteo Moschetti (ITA)	Trek–Segafredo	+ 0"

General classification after Stage 7 (1–10)
Rank	Rider	Team	Time
1	Tadej Pogačar (SLO)	UAE Team Emirates	27h 25' 53"
2	Jonas Vingegaard (DEN)	Team Jumbo–Visma	+ 1' 52"
3	Mikel Landa (ESP)	Team Bahrain Victorious	+ 2' 33"
4	Richie Porte (AUS)	INEOS Grenadiers	+ 2' 44"
5	Jai Hindley (AUS)	Bora–Hansgrohe	+ 3' 05"
6	Thymen Arensman (NED)	Team DSM	+ 3' 16"
7	Damiano Caruso (ITA)	Team Bahrain Victorious	+ 3' 20"
8	Thibaut Pinot (FRA)	Groupama–FDJ	+ 3' 37"
9	Pello Bilbao (ESP)	Team Bahrain Victorious	+ 3' 51"
10	Giulio Ciccone (ITA)	Trek–Segafredo	+ 4' 03"

== Classification leadership table ==
Classification leadership by stage
Stage	Winner	General classification	Points classification	Mountains classification	Young rider classification	Team classification
1	Filippo Ganna	Filippo Ganna	Filippo Ganna	Not awarded	Remco Evenepoel	Quick-Step Alpha Vinyl Team
2	Tim Merlier	Filippo Ganna	Filippo Ganna	Davide Bais	Remco Evenepoel	Quick-Step Alpha Vinyl Team
3	Caleb Ewan	Filippo Ganna	Tim Merlier	Davide Bais	Remco Evenepoel	Quick-Step Alpha Vinyl Team
4	Tadej Pogačar	Tadej Pogačar	Tadej Pogačar	Quinn Simmons	Tadej Pogačar	INEOS Grenadiers
5	Warren Barguil	Tadej Pogačar	Tadej Pogačar	Quinn Simmons	Tadej Pogačar	Team Bahrain Victorious
6	Tadej Pogačar	Tadej Pogačar	Tadej Pogačar	Quinn Simmons	Tadej Pogačar	Team Bahrain Victorious
7	Phil Bauhaus	Tadej Pogačar	Tadej Pogačar	Quinn Simmons	Tadej Pogačar	Team Bahrain Victorious
Final		Tadej Pogačar	Tadej Pogačar	Quinn Simmons	Tadej Pogačar	Team Bahrain Victorious

- On stage 2, Tadej Pogačar, who was third in the points classification, wore the violet jersey, because first-placed Filippo Ganna wore the blue jersey as the leader of the general classification and second-placed Remco Evenepoel wore the white jersey as the leader of the young rider classification.
- On stage 3, Tim Merlier, who was second in the points classification, wore the violet jersey, because first-placed Filippo Ganna wore the blue jersey as the leader of the general classification.
- On stage 5, Tim Merlier, who was second in the points classification, wore the violet jersey, because first-placed Tadej Pogačar wore the blue jersey as the leader of the general classification. For the same reason, Remco Evenepoel, who was second in the young rider classification, wore the white jersey.
- On stage 6, Remco Evenepoel, who was second in the points classification, wore the violet jersey, because first-placed Tadej Pogačar wore the blue jersey as the leader of the general classification. Pogačar and Evenepoel were also first and second in the young rider classification, so third-placed Thymen Arensman wore the white jersey.
- On stage 7, Jonas Vingegaard, who was second in the points classification, wore the violet jersey, because first-placed Tadej Pogačar wore the blue jersey as the leader of the general classification. For the same reason, Thymen Arensman, who was second in the young rider classification, wore the white jersey.

== Final classification standings ==
Legend
Denotes the winner of the general classification	Denotes the winner of the mountains classification
Denotes the winner of the points classification	Denotes the winner of the young rider classification

=== General classification ===
Final general classification (1–10)
Rank	Rider	Team	Time
1	Tadej Pogačar (SLO)	UAE Team Emirates	27h 25' 53"
2	Jonas Vingegaard (DEN)	Team Jumbo–Visma	+ 1' 52"
3	Mikel Landa (ESP)	Team Bahrain Victorious	+ 2' 33"
4	Richie Porte (AUS)	INEOS Grenadiers	+ 2' 44"
5	Jai Hindley (AUS)	Bora–Hansgrohe	+ 3' 05"
6	Thymen Arensman (NED)	Team DSM	+ 3' 16"
7	Damiano Caruso (ITA)	Team Bahrain Victorious	+ 3' 20"
8	Thibaut Pinot (FRA)	Groupama–FDJ	+ 3' 37"
9	Pello Bilbao (ESP)	Team Bahrain Victorious	+ 3' 51"
10	Giulio Ciccone (ITA)	Trek–Segafredo	+ 4' 03"

=== Points classification ===
Final points classification (1–10)
Rank	Rider	Team	Points
1	Tadej Pogačar (SLO)	UAE Team Emirates	44
2	Jonas Vingegaard (DEN)	Team Jumbo–Visma	24
3	Phil Bauhaus (GER)	Team Bahrain Victorious	21
4	Olav Kooij (NED)	Team Jumbo–Visma	21
5	Remco Evenepoel (BEL)	Quick-Step Alpha Vinyl Team	19
6	Tim Merlier (BEL)	Alpecin–Fenix	18
7	Kaden Groves (AUS)	Team BikeExchange–Jayco	16
8	Richie Porte (AUS)	INEOS Grenadiers	13
9	Giacomo Nizzolo (ITA)	Israel–Premier Tech	13
10	Warren Barguil (FRA)	Arkéa–Samsic	12

=== Mountains classification ===
Final mountains classification (1–10)
Rank	Rider	Team	Points
1	Quinn Simmons (USA)	Trek–Segafredo	35
2	Tadej Pogačar (SLO)	UAE Team Emirates	25
3	Jonas Vingegaard (DEN)	Team Jumbo–Visma	15
4	Davide Bais (ITA)	Eolo–Kometa	13
5	Damiano Caruso (ITA)	Team Bahrain Victorious	11
6	Mikel Landa (ESP)	Team Bahrain Victorious	10
7	Warren Barguil (FRA)	Arkéa–Samsic	9
8	Xandro Meurisse (BEL)	Alpecin–Fenix	9
9	Francesco Gavazzi (ITA)	Eolo–Kometa	8
10	Richie Porte (AUS)	INEOS Grenadiers	7

=== Young rider classification ===
Final young rider classification (1–10)
Rank	Rider	Team	Time
1	Tadej Pogačar (SLO)	UAE Team Emirates	27h 25' 53"
2	Thymen Arensman (NED)	Team DSM	+ 3' 16"
3	Remco Evenepoel (BEL)	Quick-Step Alpha Vinyl Team	+ 4' 20"
4	Jefferson Alexander Cepeda (ECU)	Drone Hopper–Androni Giocattoli	+ 19' 56"
5	Natnael Tesfatsion (ERI)	Drone Hopper–Androni Giocattoli	+ 25' 03"
6	Matteo Sobrero (ITA)	Team BikeExchange–Jayco	+ 29' 59"
7	Valentin Ferron (FRA)	Team TotalEnergies	+ 38' 32"
8	Quinn Simmons (USA)	Trek–Segafredo	+ 43' 28"
9	Einer Rubio (COL)	Movistar Team	+ 47' 05"
10	Mikkel Frølich Honoré (DEN)	Quick-Step Alpha Vinyl Team	+ 1h 00' 49"

=== Team classification ===
Final team classification (1–10)
Rank	Team	Time
1	Team Bahrain Victorious	82h 26' 46"
2	UAE Team Emirates	+ 8' 11"
3	Bora–Hansgrohe	+ 19' 04"
4	INEOS Grenadiers	+ 27' 06"
5	Cofidis	+ 29' 06"
6	Team DSM	+ 34' 16"
7	AG2R Citroën Team	+ 35' 14"
8	Movistar Team	+ 35' 54"
9	Drone Hopper–Androni Giocattoli	+ 40' 08"
10	Intermarché–Wanty–Gobert Matériaux	+ 43' 37"
