= 2022 GP Miguel Induráin =

2022 UCI ProSeries

Race details
- Dates: 2 April 2022
- Stages: 1
- Distance: 190 km (120 mi)
- Winning time: 4h 57' 49"

Results
	Winner	Warren Barguil (FRA)	(Arkéa–Samsic)
	Second	Aleksandr Vlasov^{[a]}	(Bora–Hansgrohe)
	Third	Simon Clarke (AUS)	(Israel–Premier Tech)

The 2022 GP Miguel Induráin was the 68th edition of the GP Miguel Induráin road cycling one day race, which was held on 2 April 2022, starting and finishing in Estella.

== Teams ==
Ten of the eighteen UCI WorldTeams, nine UCI ProTeams, and two UCI Continental teams made up the twenty-one teams that participated in the race. Several teams elected to compete with less than the maximum of seven riders allowed.

UCI WorldTeams

- AG2R Citroën Team
- Astana Qazaqstan Team
- Bora–Hansgrohe
- Cofidis
- Israel–Premier Tech
- Lotto–Soudal
- Movistar Team
- Team Bahrain Victorious
- Trek–Segafredo
- UAE Team Emirates

UCI ProTeams

- Arkéa–Samsic
- Burgos BH
- Caja Rural–Seguros RGA
- Eolo–Kometa
- Equipo Kern Pharma
- Euskaltel–Euskadi
- Human Powered Health
- Team Novo Nordisk
- Team TotalEnergies

UCI Continental Teams

- Glassdrive–Q8–Anicolor
- Manuela Fundación

== Result ==
Result
Rank	Rider	Team	Time
1	Warren Barguil (FRA)	Arkéa–Samsic	4h 57' 49"
2	Aleksandr Vlasov^{[a]}	Bora–Hansgrohe	+ 0"
3	Simon Clarke (AUS)	Israel–Premier Tech	+ 0"
4	Alexis Vuillermoz (FRA)	Team TotalEnergies	+ 0"
5	Andrea Vendrame (ITA)	AG2R Citroën Team	+ 0"
6	Pierre Latour (FRA)	Team TotalEnergies	+ 0"
7	Ion Izagirre (ESP)	Cofidis	+ 0"
8	Marc Hirschi (SUI)	UAE Team Emirates	+ 0"
9	Clément Champoussin (FRA)	AG2R Citroën Team	+ 0"
10	Gorka Izagirre (ESP)	Movistar Team	+ 0"

== Notes ==
^{a} As of 1 March 2022, the UCI announced that cyclists from Russia and Belarus would no longer compete under the name or flag of those respective countries due to the Russian invasion of Ukraine.
