= Warren Barguil =

French cyclist (born 1991)

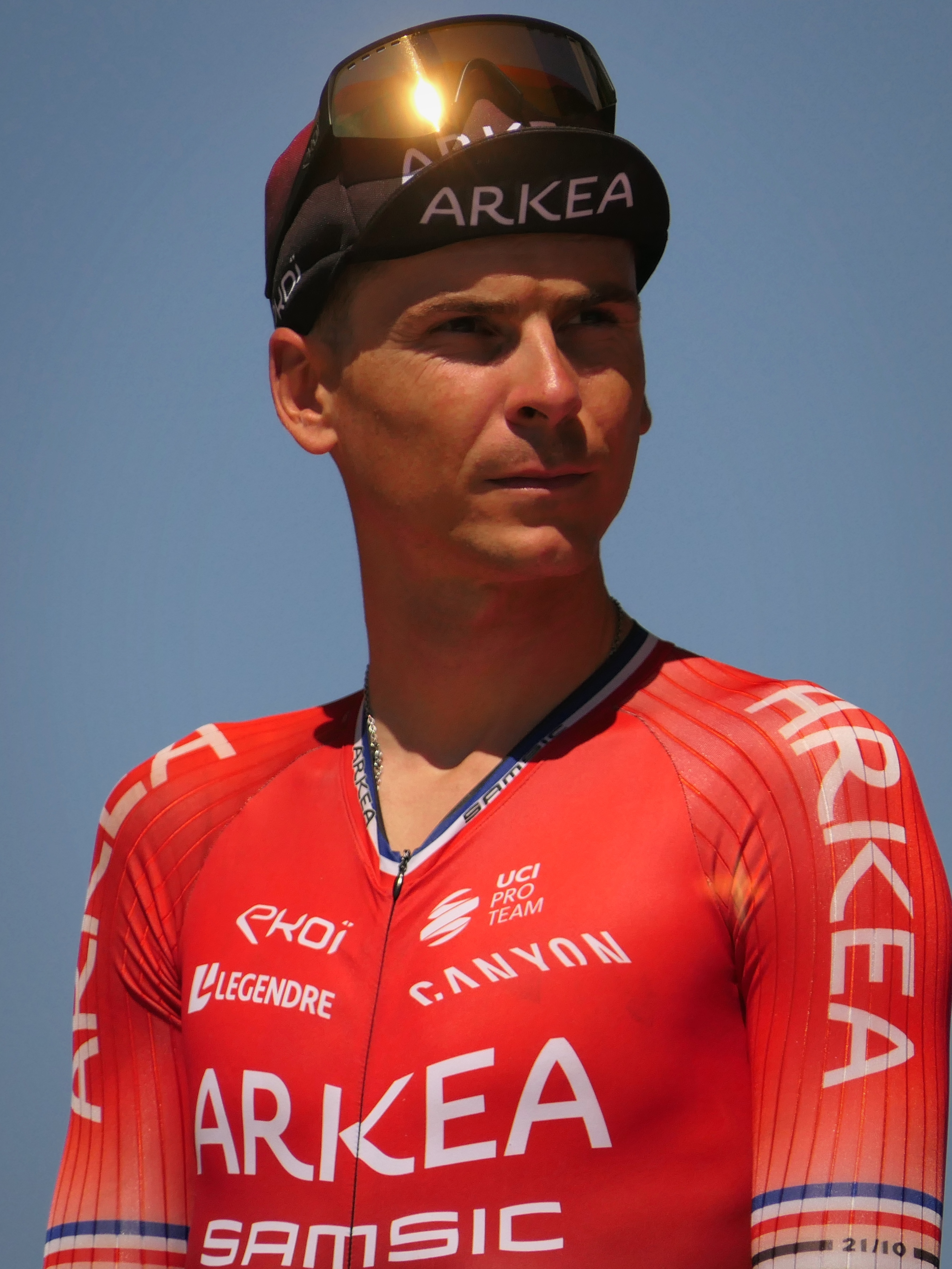
- Barguil at the 2022 Tour de France

Personal information
- Full name: Warren Barguil
- Nickname: Wawa
- Born: 28 October 1991 (age 35) Hennebont, France
- Height: 1.82 m (5 ft 11 1/2 in)
- Weight: 61 kg (134 lb; 9 st 8 lb)

Cycling career
- Sport: Cycling
- Current team: Team Picnic–PostNL
- Discipline: Road
- Role: Rider
- Rider type: Climber

Amateur teams
- 2010–2011: AC Lanester 56
- 2011: Bretagne–Schuller (stagiaire)
- 2012: CC Étupes
- 2012: Argos–Shimano (stagiaire)

Professional teams
- 2013–2017: Argos–Shimano
- 2018–2023: Fortuneo–Samsic
- 2024–: Team dsm–firmenich PostNL

Major wins
- Grand Tours Tour de France Mountains classification (2017) 2 individual stages (2017) Combativity award (2017) Vuelta a España 2 individual stages (2013) Single-day races and Classics National Road Race Championships (2019) GP Miguel Induráin (2022)

Warren Barguil (French: [waʁɛn baʁgil]; born 28 October 1991) is a French cyclist who rides for UCI WorldTeam Team Picnic–PostNL. He is best known for winning two mountain stages and the mountains classification of the 2017 Tour de France.

== Career ==
=== Early career ===
Born in Hennebont, Brittany, Barguil began his professional career in 2011 when he rode for Bretagne–Schuller as a stagiaire. He won stage 8 of the Tour de l'Avenir, and finished 5th overall, riding for the French national team. The following year, he rode also as a stagiaire for Argos–Shimano. This was a successful season for the cyclist, as he won the Tour de l'Avenir and was second overall in the Tour des Pays de Savoie.

=== Argos–Shimano (2013–2017) ===
==== 2013 ====
For the 2013 season, Barguil joined the team as a regular rider, and booked his largest victories up to that point of his career, when he won stages 13 and 16 of the Vuelta a España. Barguil took no other wins this season, but placed 4th in the Rund um Köln and 8th in the Grand Prix d'Ouverture La Marseillaise.

==== 2014 ====
The first top 10 result of Barguil's 2014 season came at La Drôme Classic, where he finished 8th. One week after that, he finished 8th again, this time in Strade Bianche. His first overall top 10 finish in a major stage race came at the Volta a Catalunya where he finished in 9th position. Barguil wanted to race the Tour de France, but the team wanted Barguil to do the Vuelta a España once again, but to focus on the general classification. Barguil finished in 8th position overall at the Vuelta a España, with his best stage result coming on Stage 20 with a 6th position atop the Puerto Ancares. He took his form with him to China, where he raced the Tour of Beijing, and finished in 6th position overall.

==== 2015 ====
The 2015 season was the first season with Barguil's main focus on the Tour de France. Barguil struggled with fitness during the spring season, but finished 12th in the Tour de Suisse as his warm up race for the Tour de France. One week after the Tour de Suisse, he finished 4th at the French National Road Race Championships. Barguil opened the Tour de France with a great first week, finishing 13th atop the Mûr-de-Bretagne and was in 8th position overall after that stage. He struggled in the third week, and dropped out of top 10 in the last few stages; he ended up finishing his first Tour de France in 14th overall.

==== 2016 ====
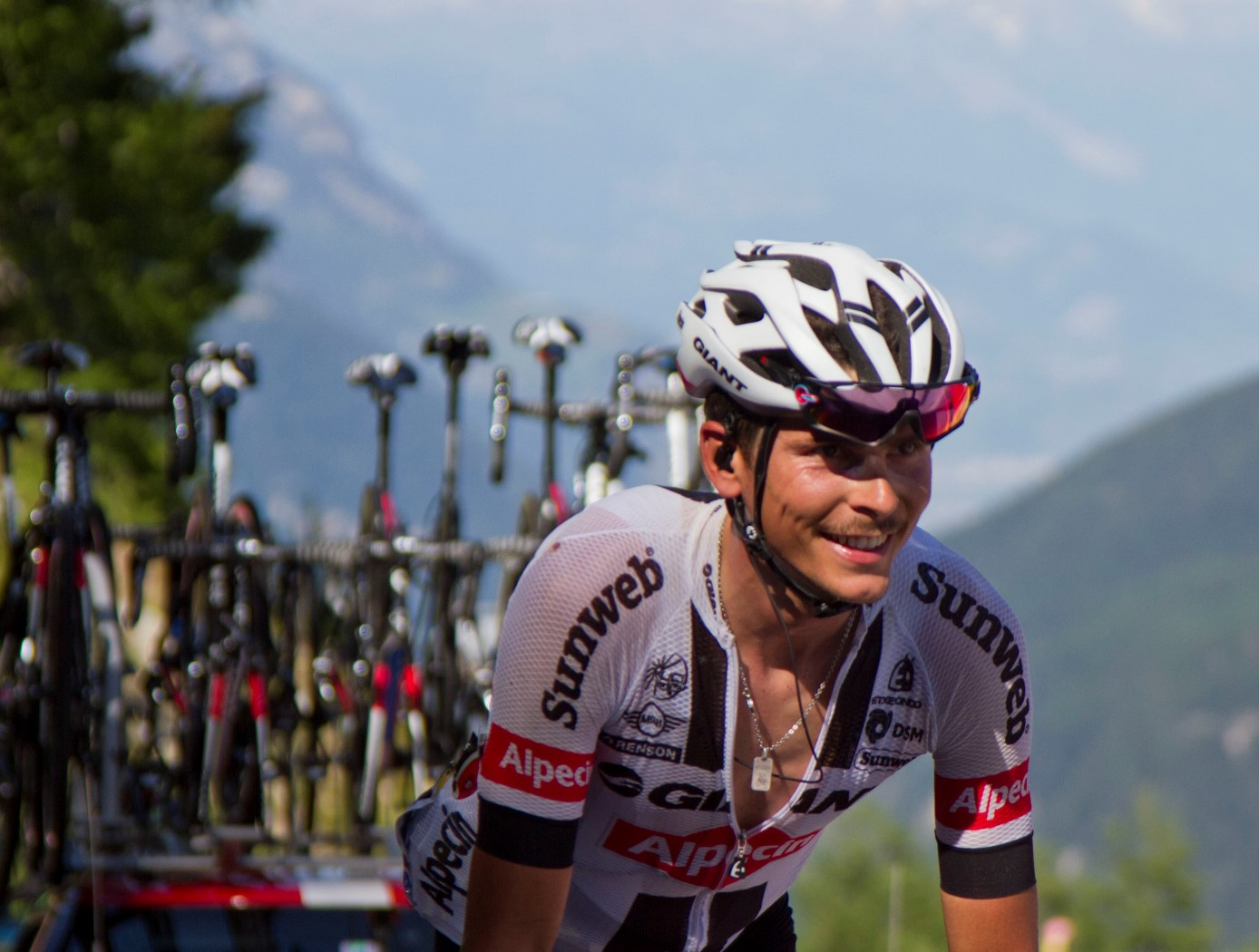
Barguil at the 2016 Tour de France

On 23 January 2016, Barguil was one of the six members of the Team Giant–Alpecin who were hit by a motorist who drove into oncoming traffic while they were training in Spain. All riders were in stable condition.

Barguil finished in 6th position in the Liège–Bastogne–Liège one-day classic. In the mid-week leading up to "La Doyenne" he finished in 9th position in La Flèche Wallonne. Barguil finished 3rd on Stage 7 of the Tour de Suisse to Sölden, and therefore took the yellow leader's jersey before heading in to the last two stages. He lost the lead the following day, however, due to his 21st position in the stage eight individual time trial. Barguil showed excellent form at the start of the Tour de France, and was 4th overall at his best in the first week. However, during the race his form dropped, and he ended up finishing 23rd overall. He went to the Olympic Games but abandoned the road race. He also abandoned the Vuelta a España on Stage 3. His best result at the fall classics was 8th at Il Lombardia.

==== 2017 ====
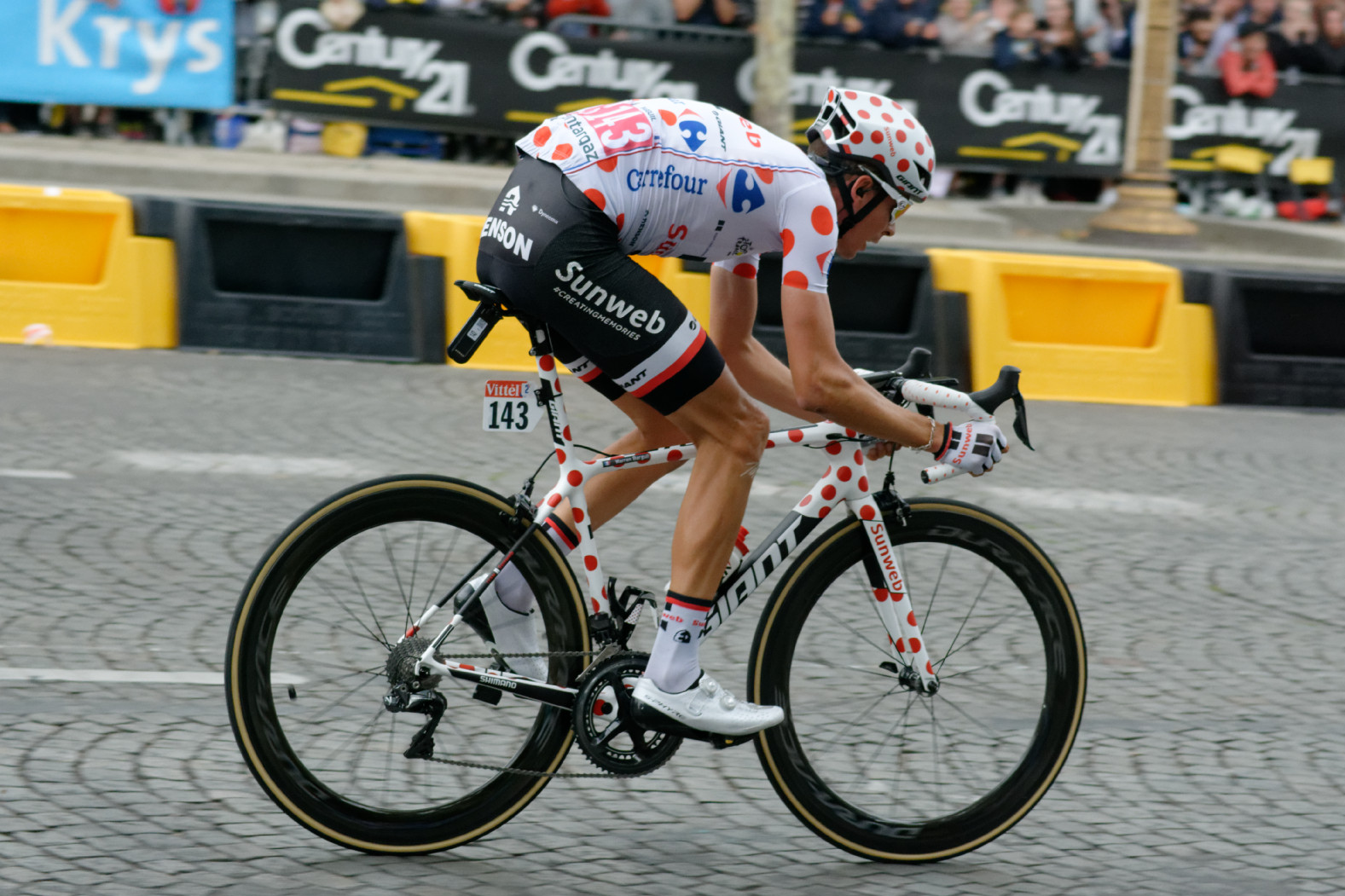
Barguil won the mountains classification at the 2017 Tour de France.

Barguil finished 8th overall at Paris–Nice, and later went on to finish 6th in La Flèche Wallonne during the spring campaign. After a crash during the Tour de Romandie, Barguil fractured his pelvis. He was ruled out for some weeks before making his comeback at Critérium du Dauphiné where he had no success. Barguil took the polka dot jersey after Stage 9 of the Tour de France; he was beaten into second position by a whisker at the stage's finishing line in Chambéry by Rigoberto Urán in a thrilling photo finish. He won Stage 13 in a sprint finish from a four-man breakaway in Foix, beating Nairo Quintana, Alberto Contador and Mikel Landa; that was the first Tour de France stage win of his career and made him the first Frenchman to win a Tour de France stage on Bastille Day since David Moncoutié's Stage 12 victory in 2005. Barguil also won Stage 18 that finished on the hors catégorie Col d'Izoard after surging clear of lone stage leader Darwin Atapuma – who had been leading the stage solo by 1:45 with 5 kilometres (3.1 miles) to go – 800 metres (2,600 feet) from the finishing line. After his Stage 18 win, Barguil had an insurmountable 89-point lead over second-placed Primož Roglič at the top of the mountains classification.

Barguil was thrown out the Vuelta a España by Team Sunweb prior to Stage 8. He was 13th in the general classification after the end of Stage 7, 1:43 behind the general classification leader Chris Froome. The reasons given by Team Sunweb for Barguil's ejection from the race were: his disagreement with the team over race goals and tactics; he wanted a free role to work for himself in the mountain stages and that this had created several disagreements within the team, and his refusal to obey team orders by not waiting for Wilco Kelderman, after he had a punctured tyre on stage 7 and lost time as a result of it.

=== Fortuneo–Samsic (2018–2023) ===
For the 2018 season, Barguil joined UCI Professional Continental team Fortuneo–Samsic, signing a three-year contract with the French team. Barguil opened his season at the Tour La Provence, and finished 32nd overall. His first World Tour race of the season was Paris–Nice where he finished 17th overall. A few weeks later he finished 15th overall at the Volta a Catalunya. At the Critérium du Dauphiné he attacked on stage 6 but was later brought back by the group of race favourites. At the Tour de France, Barguil made his first attack on the first mountain stage but it was without any luck. On the following two stages, he went into the breakaway and collected points for the polka dot jersey. He finished 2nd overall in the Mountains classification and 17th overall in the race. His first top 10 result of the year came, at the Deutschland Tour where he finished 6th overall. His best result at the season was in September where he rode Grand Prix de Wallonie and finished 3rd.

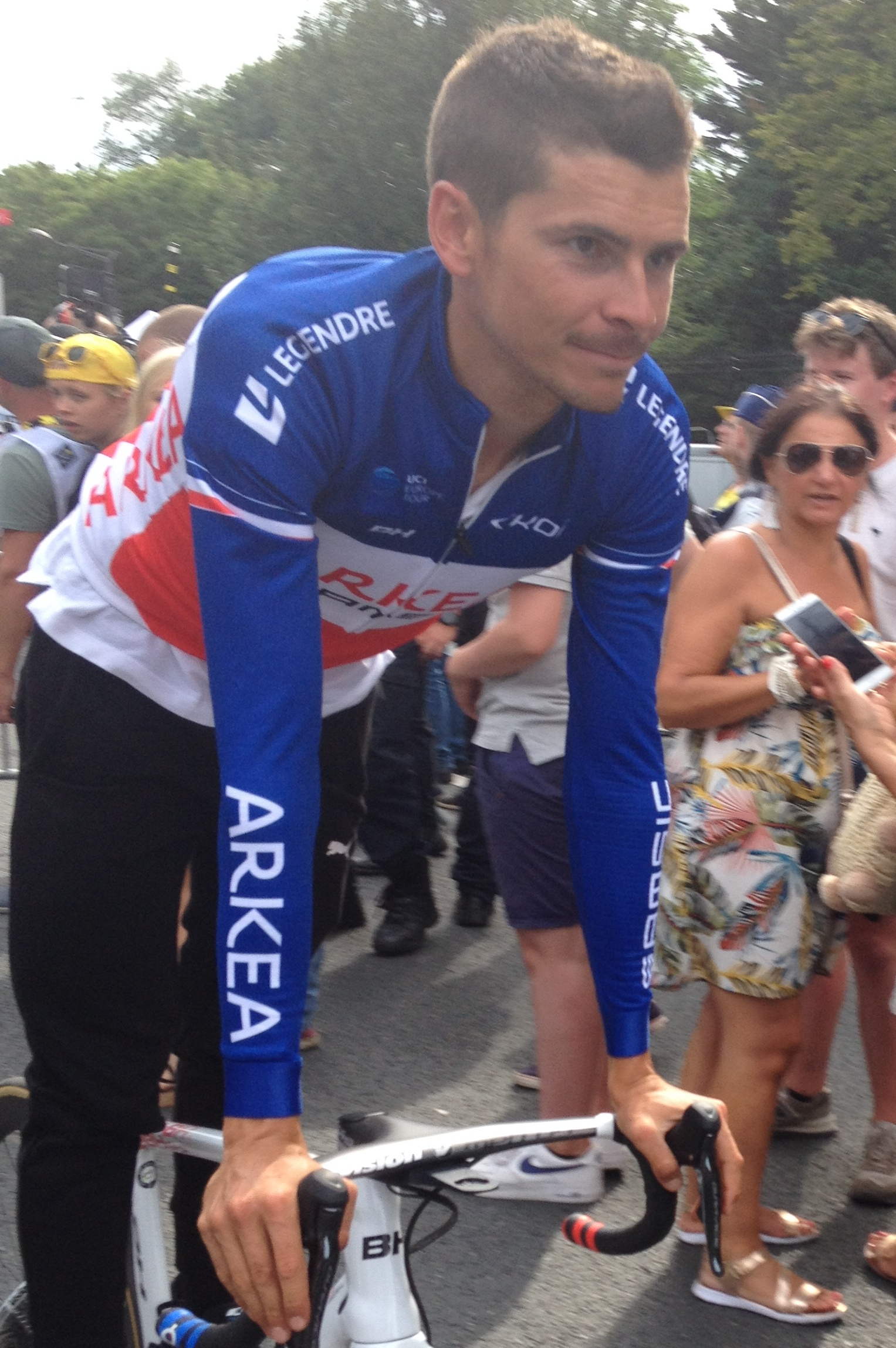
Barguil at the 2019 Tour de France

After a rough beginning to 2019, Barguil won the French National Road Race Championships, in a sprint finish. He had previously considered retiring from the sport due to his lack of success. Barguil entered the Tour de France as usual, again with the goal of getting stage wins. He attacked on several mountain stages, showing good form, but was unable to win any stages. He did however finish 10th overall. After the Tour de France, Barguil confirmed that he would remain with Arkéa–Samsic for another season, despite being contacted by several UCI WorldTeams. He then finished second overall at the Arctic Race of Norway, losing the race lead on the final day to Alexey Lutsenko.

Prior to the COVID-19 pandemic-enforced suspension of racing in March 2020, Barguil recorded two top-five finishes in French one-day races, with fourth place at the Ardèche Classic, and second at La Drôme Classic, losing out to Simon Clarke in a small group sprint in the latter. When racing resumed in the summer, Barguil recorded top-ten overall finishes at the Route d'Occitanie and the Critérium du Dauphiné. After finishing fourteenth at the Tour de France, Barguil finished his season with four more top-ten finishes in one-day races with a best result of fourth place at La Flèche Wallonne, finishing in the same time as race winner Marc Hirschi.

Barguil again finished in the top-five at the 2021 La Flèche Wallonne, finishing eleven seconds down on race winner Julian Alaphilippe in fifth place. Prior to the Tour de France, Barguil finished fourth in the French National Road Race Championships in Épinal. In August, Barguil finished eighth overall at the Arctic Race of Norway, before winning the Tour du Limousin on the final day, after overnight leader Dorian Godon lost over two minutes. He finished his season with a second-place finish at the Grand Prix de Wallonie, behind only Christophe Laporte.

After five top-ten results in the early part of the 2022 season, Barguil recorded his first UCI World Tour victory since the 2017 Tour de France, with a win on the fifth stage at Tirreno–Adriatico; he soloed clear of his breakaway companions at the start of the final climb to Fermo, ultimately holding onto a 10-second winning margin over Xandro Meurisse. His next start came at the snowy GP Miguel Induráin, where he won a small group sprint of some ten riders to take victory. Later in April, he finished third at Brabantse Pijl, and was again inside the top-ten placings at La Flèche Wallonne. He featured in the breakaway during the sixth stage of the Critérium du Dauphiné, but finished third behind Valentin Ferron and Pierre Rolland. Barguil finished fourth in the French National Road Race Championships – for the second year in succession – ahead of the Tour de France, from which he ultimately withdrew due to a positive test for COVID-19. Towards the end of the season, at the Laurentian classics in Canada, Barguil recorded tenth-place finishes at both the Grand Prix Cycliste de Québec and the Grand Prix Cycliste de Montréal, and a further tenth-place finish on his return to Europe, at the Grand Prix de Wallonie.

Having recorded a fourth top-ten finish in as many years at the 2023 La Flèche Wallonne with tenth place, Barguil made his first start at the Giro d'Italia, as team leader for Arkéa–Samsic. Barguil spent more than 500 kilometres (310 miles) in breakaways during the race, with his best stage result being a third-place finish on stage 18, which finished in Val di Zoldo; he finished the race in 17th overall.

== Major results ==
2009
1st Road race, National Junior Road Championships
4th Tour de Vallées
8th Overall Le Trophée Centre Morbihan
2010
3rd La Melrandaise
2011
4th Overall Coupe des nations Ville Saguenay
5th Overall Tour de l'Avenir

1st Stage 8

8th Paris–Tours Espoirs
10th Overall Tour de l'Ain
2012
1st Overall Tour de l'Avenir

1st Points classification
1st Mountains classification
1st Stage 4

2nd Overall Tour des Pays de Savoie

1st Points classification
1st Mountains classification
1st Young rider classification
1st Stage 2

2nd Paris–Tours Espoirs
3rd Overall Tour Alsace

1st Young rider classification

2013 (2 pro wins)
Vuelta a España

1st Stages 13 & 16

4th Rund um Köln
8th Grand Prix d'Ouverture La Marseillaise
9th Amstel Curaçao Race
2014
6th Overall Tour of Beijing
8th Overall Vuelta a España
8th La Drôme Classic
8th Strade Bianche
9th Overall Volta a Catalunya
2015
4th Road race, National Road Championships
8th International Road Cycling Challenge
9th Clásica de San Sebastián
9th Grand Prix Cycliste de Québec
2016
3rd Overall Tour de Suisse
6th Liège–Bastogne–Liège
8th Giro di Lombardia
9th La Flèche Wallonne
10th Milano–Torino
2017 (2)
6th La Flèche Wallonne
8th Overall Paris–Nice
10th Overall Tour de France

1st Mountains classification
1st Stages 13 & 18
Combativity award Stage 9 & Overall

2018
3rd Grand Prix de Wallonie
6th Overall Deutschland Tour
10th Coppa Sabatini
10th Memorial Marco Pantani
2019 (1)
1st Road race, National Road Championships
2nd Overall Arctic Race of Norway
3rd La Drôme Classic
6th Coppa Agostoni
9th Trofeo Campos, Porreres, Felanitx, Ses Salines
9th Trofeo Andratx–Lloseta
9th Giro della Toscana
10th Overall Tour de France
2020
2nd La Drôme Classic
4th La Flèche Wallonne
4th Ardèche Classic
5th Brabantse Pijl
5th Paris–Tours
7th Overall Route d'Occitanie
9th Overall Critérium du Dauphiné
9th Liège–Bastogne–Liège
2021 (1)
1st Overall Tour du Limousin
2nd Grand Prix de Wallonie
4th Road race, National Road Championships
5th La Flèche Wallonne
8th Overall Arctic Race of Norway
9th La Drôme Classic
2022 (2)
1st GP Miguel Induráin
1st Stage 5 Tirreno–Adriatico
3rd Brabantse Pijl
4th Road race, National Road Championships
7th Vuelta a Murcia
7th Clásica Jaén Paraíso Interior
8th Ardèche Classic
8th Trofeo Serra de Tramuntana
9th La Flèche Wallonne
9th La Drôme Classic
10th Grand Prix Cycliste de Québec
10th Grand Prix Cycliste de Montréal
10th Grand Prix de Wallonie
Combativity award Stage 11 Tour de France
2023
4th Coppa Agostoni
9th Clásica Jaén Paraíso Interior
10th La Flèche Wallonne
10th Giro dell'Emilia
2024
1st Stage 1 (TTT) Danmark Rundt
4th La Drôme Classic
6th Overall Tour of Oman
6th Muscat Classic
8th Overall CRO Race
2025
9th La Drôme Classic
10th Eschborn–Frankfurt

=== General classification results timeline ===
Grand Tour general classification results
| Grand Tour | 2013 | 2014 | 2015 | 2016 | 2017 | 2018 | 2019 | 2020 | 2021 | 2022 | 2023 | 2024 | 2025 | 2026 |
| Giro d'Italia | — | — | — | — | — | — | — | — | — | — | 17 | — | — | 57 |
| Tour de France | — | — | 14 | 23 | 10 | 17 | 10 | 14 | DNF | DNF | 22 | 40 | 23 | IP |
| Vuelta a España | 38 | 8 | — | DNF | DNF | — | — | — | — | — | — | — | — | — |
Major stage race general classification results
| Race | 2013 | 2014 | 2015 | 2016 | 2017 | 2018 | 2019 | 2020 | 2021 | 2022 | 2023 | 2024 | 2025 | 2026 |
| Paris–Nice | 72 | — | DNF | — | 8 | 17 | DNF | DSQ | 14 | — | — | — | 34 | — |
| Tirreno–Adriatico | — | — | — | — | — | — | — | — | — | 20 | 24 | — | — | — |
| Volta a Catalunya | — | 9 | 17 | 22 | — | 15 | DNF | NH | — | — | — | — | — | — |
| Tour of the Basque Country | DNF | 20 | — | DNF | 16 | — | — | NH | — | — | — | 48 | 28 | — |
| Tour de Romandie | — | — | — | — | DNF | — | — | NH | — | — | — | — | — | DNF |
| Critérium du Dauphiné | 18 | — | — | — | 30 | 19 | 13 | 9 | 38 | 24 | — | 22 | — | — |
| Tour de Suisse | — | 30 | 12 | 3 | — | — | — | NH | — | — | — | — | 16 | — |

=== Classics results timeline ===
| Monument | 2013 | 2014 | 2015 | 2016 | 2017 | 2018 | 2019 | 2020 | 2021 | 2022 | 2023 | 2024 | 2025 | 2026 |
|---|---|---|---|---|---|---|---|---|---|---|---|---|---|---|
| Milan–San Remo | — | — | — | — | — | — | — | — | 44 | — | 40 | — | 84 | — |
| Tour of Flanders | — | — | — | — | — | — | — | — | 36 | — | — | — | — | — |
| Paris–Roubaix | Has not contested during his career | | | | | | | | | | | | | |
| Liège–Bastogne–Liège | — | 29 | 34 | 6 | 38 | 53 | — | 9 | 26 | 15 | DNF | — | DNF | — |
| Giro di Lombardia | 47 | 36 | 20 | 8 | 34 | 26 | — | — | — | 12 | 24 | 31 | DNF | |
| Classic | 2013 | 2014 | 2015 | 2016 | 2017 | 2018 | 2019 | 2020 | 2021 | 2022 | 2023 | 2024 | 2025 | 2026 |
| Strade Bianche | — | 8 | — | — | — | — | — | — | — | 27 | 20 | DNF | — | — |
| Brabantse Pijl | — | — | — | — | — | 21 | — | 5 | — | 3 | 17 | — | — | — |
| Amstel Gold Race | — | — | 72 | 15 | 45 | — | — | NH | 25 | 21 | 35 | DNF | 30 | DNF |
| La Flèche Wallonne | DNF | 23 | 26 | 9 | 6 | 45 | — | 4 | 5 | 9 | 10 | — | 54 | 119 |
| Eschborn–Frankfurt | — | — | NH | — | — | — | — | NH | — | — | — | — | 10 | — |
| Clásica de San Sebastián | — | — | 9 | 54 | 13 | — | — | NH | 44 | — | — | DNF | 42 | |
| Bretagne Classic | — | — | 56 | — | — | — | 12 | — | 20 | 13 | 34 | 25 | 117 | |
| Grand Prix Cycliste de Québec | — | — | 9 | — | — | — | — | Not held | | 10 | 24 | 80 | DNF | |
| Grand Prix Cycliste de Montréal | — | — | 27 | — | — | — | — | Not held | | 10 | 21 | 31 | DNF | |
| Giro dell'Emilia | — | — | — | — | — | — | 34 | — | — | — | 10 | — | DNF | |
| Paris–Tours | 70 | — | — | 171 | — | — | — | 5 | — | — | — | — | — | |

=== Major championships timeline ===
| Event | | 2013 | 2014 | 2015 | 2016 | 2017 | 2018 | 2019 | 2020 | 2021 | 2022 | 2023 | 2024 | 2025 | 2026 |
|---|---|---|---|---|---|---|---|---|---|---|---|---|---|---|---|
| Olympic Games | Road race | Not held | | | DNF | Not held | | | | — | Not held | | — | Not held | |
| World Championships | Road race | DNF | 19 | — | — | 37 | DNF | — | — | — | — | — | — | — | |
| National Championships | Road race | 14 | 12 | 4 | 33 | — | 7 | 1 | 27 | 4 | 4 | DNF | — | 30 | — |

Legend
| — | Did not compete |
| DNF | Did not finish |
