= 2016 Gent–Wevelgem =

2016 UCI World Tour, race 7 of 28
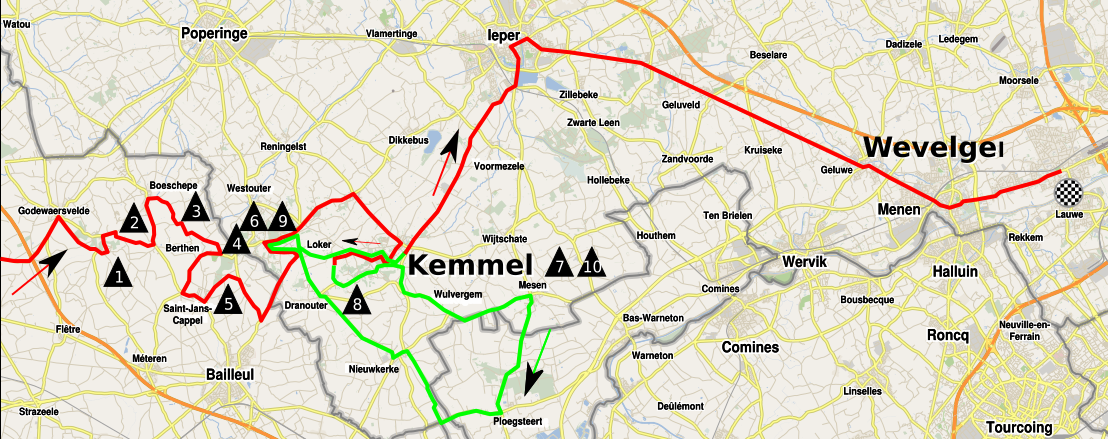
- Map of the hills area of 2016 Gent–Wevelgem

Race details
- Dates: 27 March 2016
- Stages: 1
- Distance: 243 km (151 mi)
- Winning time: 5h 55' 16"

Results
	Winner	Peter Sagan (SVK)	(Tinkoff)
	Second	Sep Vanmarcke (BEL)	(LottoNL–Jumbo)
	Third	Vyacheslav Kuznetsov (RUS)	(Team Katusha)

The 2016 Gent–Wevelgem, (officially Gent–Wevelgem – In Flanders Fields) was a one-day Belgian cycling classic that took place on 27 March 2016. It was the 78th edition of the Gent–Wevelgem race and the seventh event of the 2016 UCI World Tour. The race followed a 243-kilometre (151 mi) course that started in Deinze and ended in Wevelgem in Belgium, with a portion of the race spent in northern France. The race included ten climbs, several of them cobbled, which provided the principal difficulty in the race. The last and most difficult climb was the Kemmelberg. The favourites for the race included Alexander Kristoff (Team Katusha), Fabian Cancellara (Trek–Segafredo), and Peter Sagan (Tinkoff). The race was won by Peter Sagan.

Sagan escaped with Cancellara and Sep Vanmarcke (LottoNL–Jumbo) on the Kemmelberg after a series of splits had occurred in the first half of the race. They were joined by Vyacheslav Kuznetsov (Team Katusha), who had been in the day's early breakaway, and the four-man group came to the finish together. Sagan won the sprint, with Vanmarcke second and Kuznetsov third.

During the French portion of the race, the Belgian rider Antoine Demoitié (Wanty–Groupe Gobert) crashed and was then hit by a race motorbike. He died that evening.

== Route ==
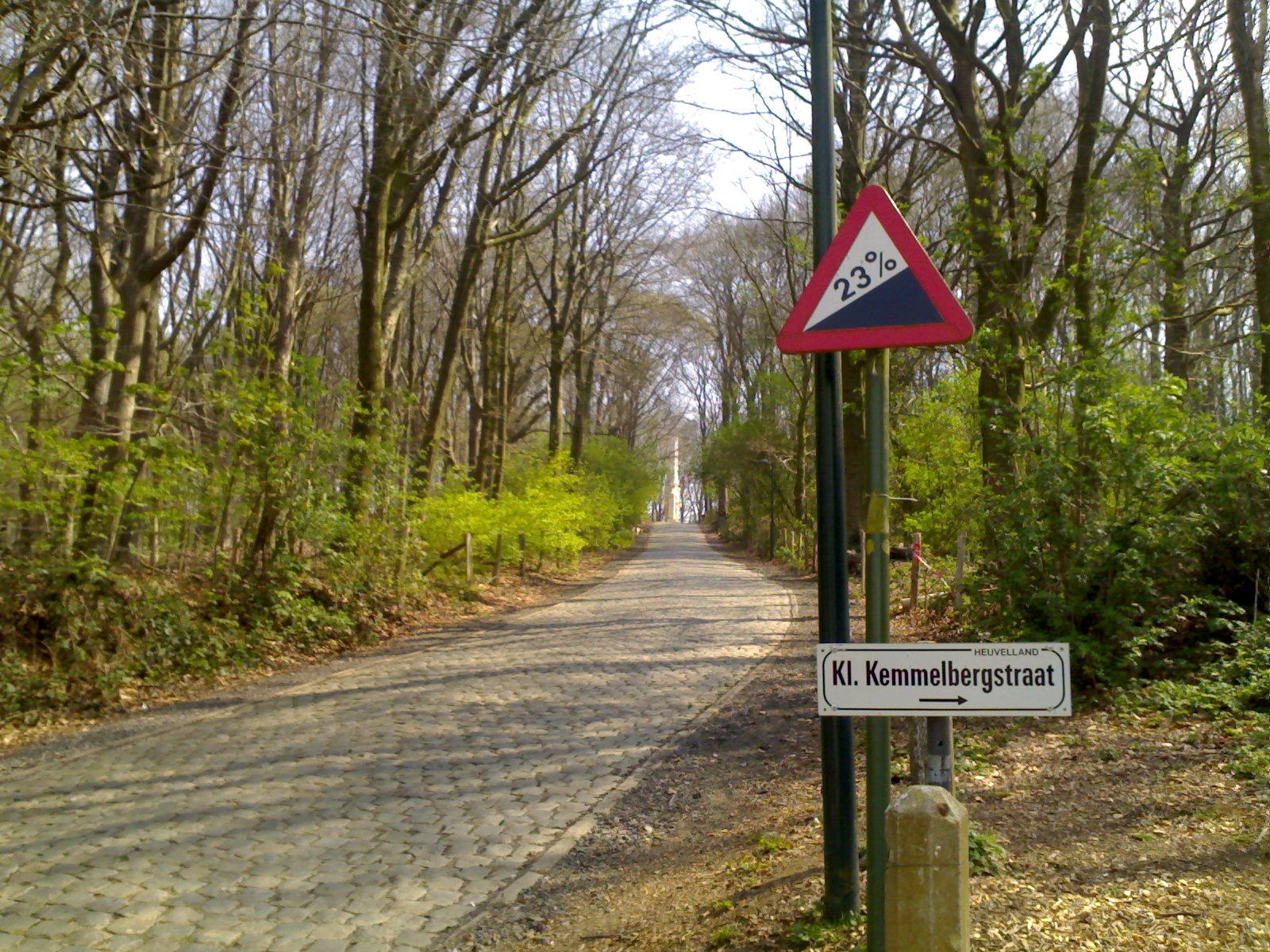
The Kemmelberg was addressed by its toughest road, with slopes up to 23% gradient.

The route of the 2016 Gent–Wevelgem was significantly changed from 2015 edition and from previous editions. Several different climbs were used. Central among these was the decision to use a different side of the core climb in the race, the Kemmelberg. In previous years, the route chosen had a maximum gradient of 17%, but the 2016 edition used a road that had a section at 23%, described by Cycling Weekly as "excruciating". The race director, Hans De Clercq, gave three reasons for the change: the cobblestones had recently been relaid; the 2016 edition marked the 60th anniversary of the inclusion of the Kemmelberg, with the difficult side used on that occasion; and there was a desire to give the race more of a balance between sprinters and attackers. COTACOL, a Belgian work that lists and grades all the climbs in the country, rated the side of the Kemmelberg used in 2016 as the most difficult climb in Flanders: its grading of 183 points was more than the Koppenberg (172), the Muur van Geraardsbergen (171) or the traditional route up the Kemmelberg (152).

The race started in Deinze in East Flanders, 20 kilometres (12 mi) from Ghent. The route took the riders immediately into West Flanders. After 77 kilometres (48 mi) of flat roads, they came near the coast at Veurne. Here the route took the riders south into northern France; after 119 kilometres (74 mi) the peloton passed through Wormhout, then continued south of Steenvoorde, where there were the first climbs in the race. The first eight climbs came quickly, packed into a 32 kilometres (20 mi) stretch of road. The first climb was the Catsberg; this was followed by the Kokereelberg, the Vert Mon, the Côte du Ravel Put and the Côte de la Blanchisserie. The riders then returned to Belgium and climbed the Baneberg, the Kemmelberg and the Monteberg. There was then a flatter section, looping through Mesen, Ploegsteer and Nieuwkerke. The final two climbs were a repeat of the Baneberg–Kemmelberg combination. At the top of the final climb, there were 34 kilometres (21 mi) of fairly flat roads to the finish in Wevelgem.

== Participating teams ==
There were 25 teams selected to take part in the race. All 18 UCI WorldTeams were automatically invited; the race organisers gave wildcard invitations to seven UCI Professional Continental teams. These included two Belgian teams (Wanty–Groupe Gobert and Topsport Vlaanderen–Baloise), two French teams (Direct Énergie and Cofidis), a Dutch team (Roompot–Oranje Peloton), an Italian team (Bardiani–CSF) and a Polish team (CCC–Sprandi–Polkowice). Each team could include eight riders. Orica–GreenEDGE's team of seven was the only one submitted with fewer than eight riders, but three riders (Team Sky's Ian Stannard, Team Katusha's Alexander Kristoff and AG2R La Mondiale's Alexis Gougeard) did not start the race; 196 riders therefore departed from Deinze.

UCI WorldTeams

- AG2R La Mondiale
- Astana
- BMC Racing Team
- Team Dimension Data
- Etixx–Quick-Step
- FDJ
- IAM Cycling
- Lampre–Merida
- Lotto–Soudal
- Movistar Team
- Team Giant–Alpecin
- Team Katusha
- LottoNL–Jumbo
- Team Sky
- Tinkoff
- Trek–Segafredo
- Cannondale
- Orica–GreenEDGE

UCI Professional Continental teams

- CCC–Sprandi–Polkowice
- Cofidis
- Bardiani–CSF
- Direct Énergie
- Roompot–Oranje Peloton
- Topsport Vlaanderen–Baloise
- Wanty–Groupe Gobert

== Pre-race favourites ==
There was some uncertainty before the race about whether it would favour the sprinters or those who attacked on the hills. Among the sprinters, Alexander Kristoff, the winner of the 2014 Tour of Flanders, was the favourite, with André Greipel (Lotto–Soudal), Arnaud Démare (FDJ), Mark Cavendish (Team Dimension Data), Elia Viviani (Team Sky) and Fernando Gaviria (Etixx–Quick-Step) also considered possible winners. Kristoff, however, had to pull out of the race due to a fever that started after E3 Harelbeke two days earlier.

There were also many riders who had the potential to attack earlier in the race. These included Tom Boonen (Etixx–Quick-Step), who had won the race on three previous occasions, and his teammates Niki Terpstra and Zdeněk Štybar. Peter Sagan (Tinkoff), the reigning world champion, had won the race in 2013 with a solo attack; he also had the ability to perform strongly in a sprint. He had not yet won a race in 2016. Other riders likely to attack early in the race included Fabian Cancellara (Trek–Segafredo), Luke Rowe (Sky), Sep Vanmarcke (LottoNL–Jumbo), Greg Van Avermaet (BMC Racing Team) and Edvald Boasson Hagen (Dimension Data), who had won the 2009 edition of the race.

The 2015 winner, Luca Paolini, was not present to defend his title due to his suspension following a positive test for cocaine during the 2015 Tour de France.

== Race summary ==
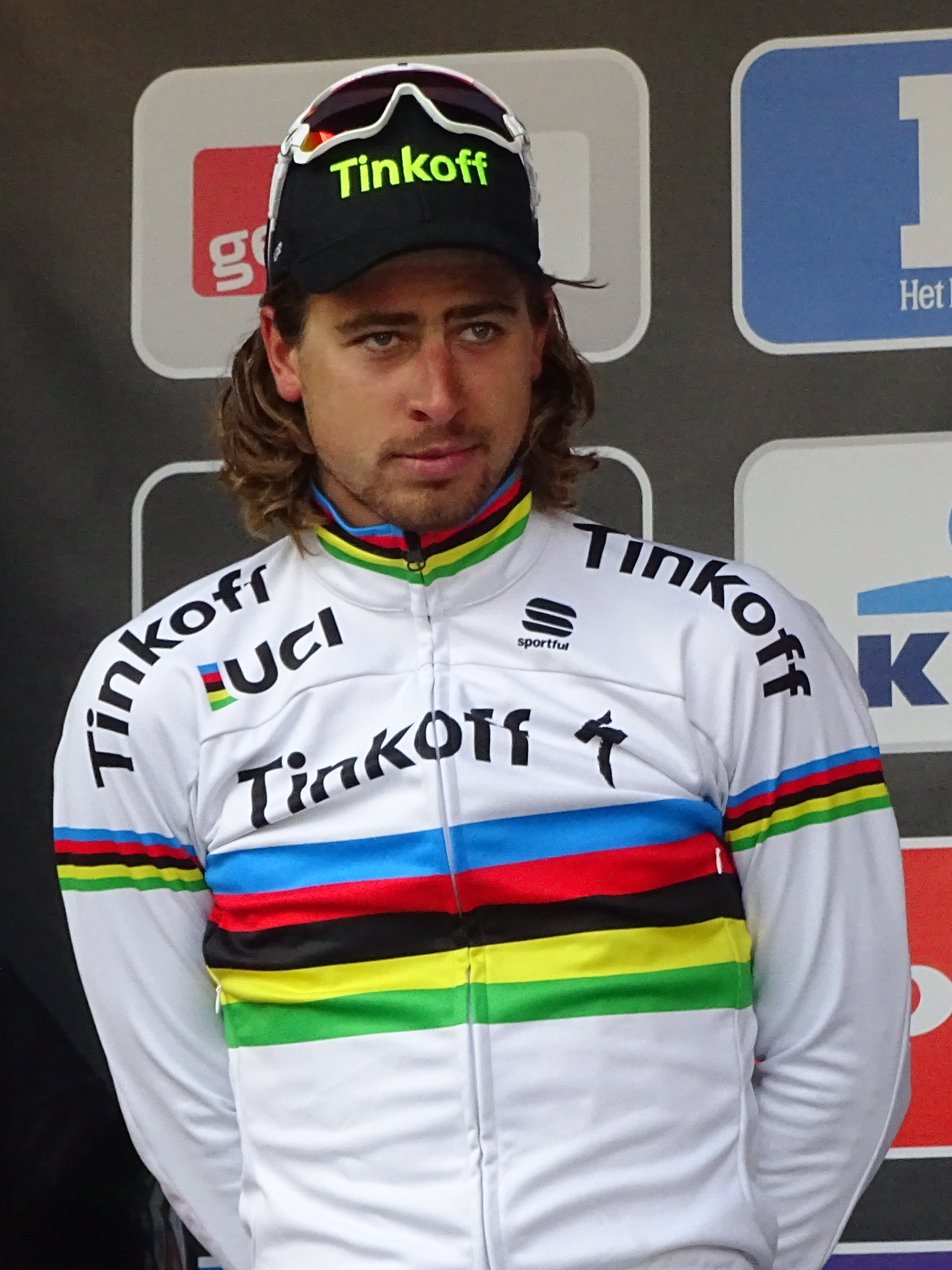
Peter Sagan (Tinkoff), wearing the rainbow jersey of the reigning world champion (photographed at the 2016 Omloop Het Nieuwsblad)

The race took place in windy weather. Combined with a crash, these conditions caused the peloton to break into several groups in the first part of the race. The first group was a five-rider breakaway, composed of Lieuwe Westra (Astana), Pavel Brutt (Tinkoff), Josef Černý (CCC–Sprandi–Polkowice), Jonas Rickaert (Topsport Vlaanderen–Baloise) and Simon Pellaud (IAM Cycling). Their lead extended to eleven minutes at one point, but was quickly reduced when the pace of the main peloton increased. This broke the peloton into echelons. By the halfway stage, there was a chasing group 90 seconds behind that contained many of the race favourites, including Boonen, Boasson Hagen, Cancellara, Sagan, Tiesj Benoot and Jens Debusschere (both Lotto–Soudal), and Van Avermaet. They were chased by another group that was led by Trek–Segafredo and LottoNL–Jumbo; this group was around a minute further behind. With 115 kilometres (71 mi) remaining, the first chasing group caught the breakaway; 24 kilometres (15 mi) later, this group was in turn caught by the other chasing group. There was therefore a 50-rider group at the head of the race.

There was calm in the peloton for a while, with five climbs remaining to be raced. Trek–Segafredo controlled the peloton over the Baneberg and the first climb of the Kemmelberg. Between the two climbs, however, Debusschere crashed and was forced to retire from the race. On the Monteberg, with 66 kilometres (41 mi) remaining, five riders attacked. These were Matteo Trentin, who initiated the move, Brutt, Benoot, Daniel Oss (BMC Racing Team) and Giacomo Nizzolo (Trek–Segafredo). They were chased by Dimension Data and LottoNL–Jumbo, but it took 15 kilometres (9.3 mi) to bring them back. When they were caught, Vyacheslav Kuznetsov (Katusha) attacked alone and had a minute's lead by the second climb of the Baneberg.

Vanmarcke attacked on the Baneberg, but was chased down by the peloton, led by Manuel Quinziato (BMC). On the second climb of the Kemmelberg, from the difficult side, Cancellara attacked and was followed by Vanmarcke and Sagan. They caught Kuznetsov and formed a four-man leading group. They were chased at first by a group of Luke Rowe, Zdeněk Štybar and Greg Van Avermaet, but were able to increase their advantage. The chasing group was caught by the peloton and the four leaders came to the finish together with a comfortable advantage. They had a lead of 40 seconds until they slowed down significantly in preparation for the sprint. Kuznetsov was the first to sprint; he was followed, however, by Sagan, who came past him to take the race victory. Vanmarcke finished just ahead of Kuznetsov to take second place, with Cancellara finishing fourth. The peloton finished eleven seconds behind, with Démare winning the sprint for fifth place.

=== Death of Antoine Demoitié ===
The race was marred by the death of Antoine Demoitié (Wanty–Groupe Gobert). Demoitié crashed with four other riders near Sainte-Marie-Cappel during the French section of the race, with approximately 115 kilometres (71 mi) of racing remaining. After the crash, he was lying on the road and was hit by a race motorbike that was following the riders. Demoitié was initially taken to hospital in Ypres before being transferred to the intensive care unit of the university hospital in Lille, due to the severity of his injuries. His team released a statement describing his condition as "extremely serious"; several hours later, a spokesman for the local gendarmerie confirmed that he had died. The crash was seen by Julien Jurdie, a directeur sportif for the AG2R La Mondiale team, who said that Demoitié had been part of a group chasing to get back to the peloton, travelling downhill at around 70 kilometres per hour (43 mph). He said that, when the riders crashed, there was no time for the motorbike rider to brake and he immediately recognised that the incident was very serious.

== Results ==
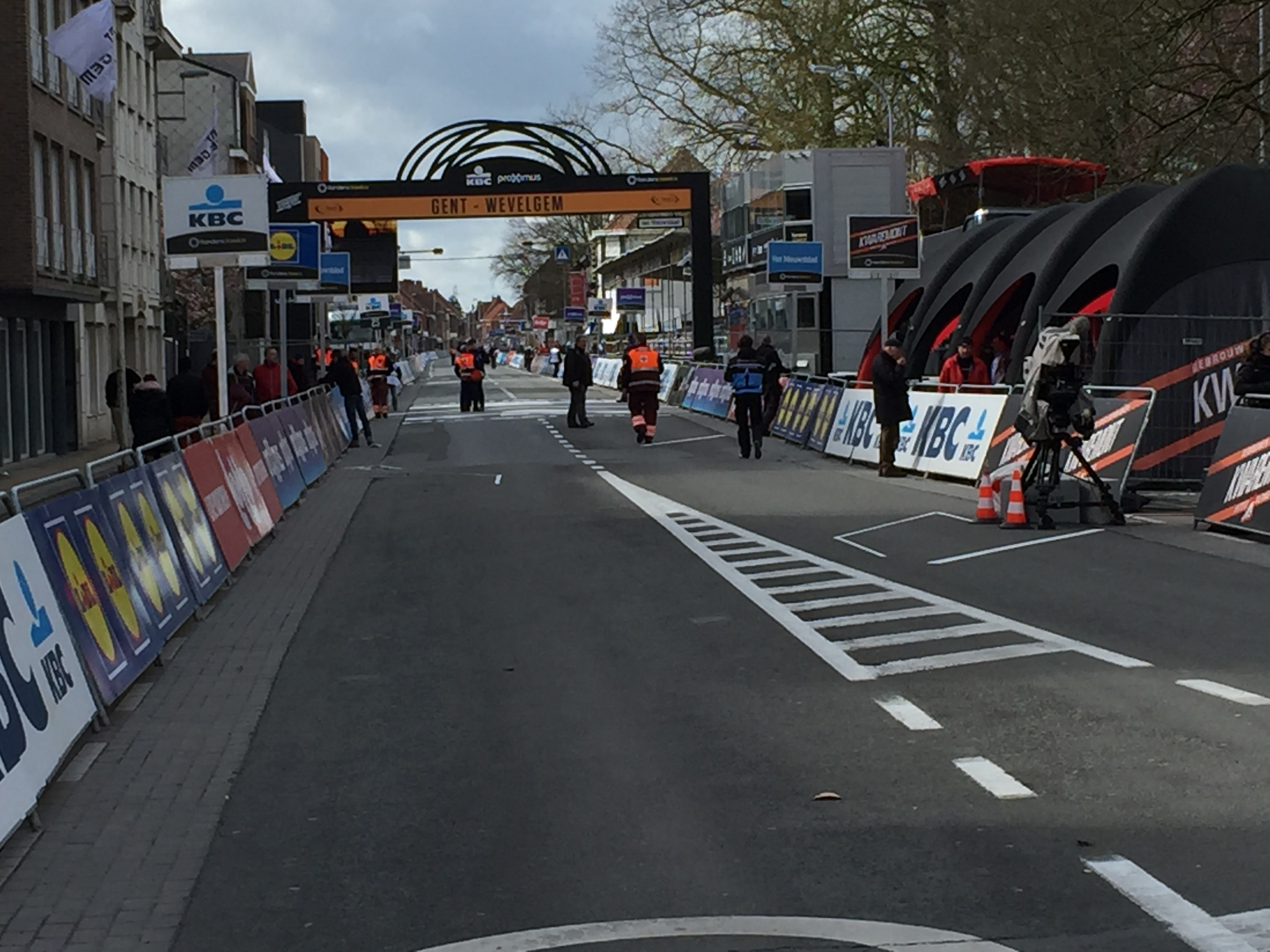
Finish line

Result (top 10 of 82 finishers)
Rank	Rider	Team	Time
1	Peter Sagan (SVK)	Tinkoff	5h 55' 12"
2	Sep Vanmarcke (BEL)	LottoNL–Jumbo	+ 0"
3	Vyacheslav Kuznetsov (RUS)	Team Katusha	+ 0"
4	Fabian Cancellara (SUI)	Trek–Segafredo	+ 0"
5	Arnaud Démare (FRA)	FDJ	+ 11"
6	Fernando Gaviria (COL)	Etixx–Quick-Step	+ 11"
7	Jürgen Roelandts (BEL)	Lotto–Soudal	+ 11"
8	Jacopo Guarnieri (ITA)	Team Katusha	+ 11"
9	Greg Van Avermaet (BEL)	BMC Racing Team	+ 11"
10	Michael Mørkøv (DEN)	Team Katusha	+ 11"

== Post-race analysis ==
=== Reaction to Demoitié's death ===
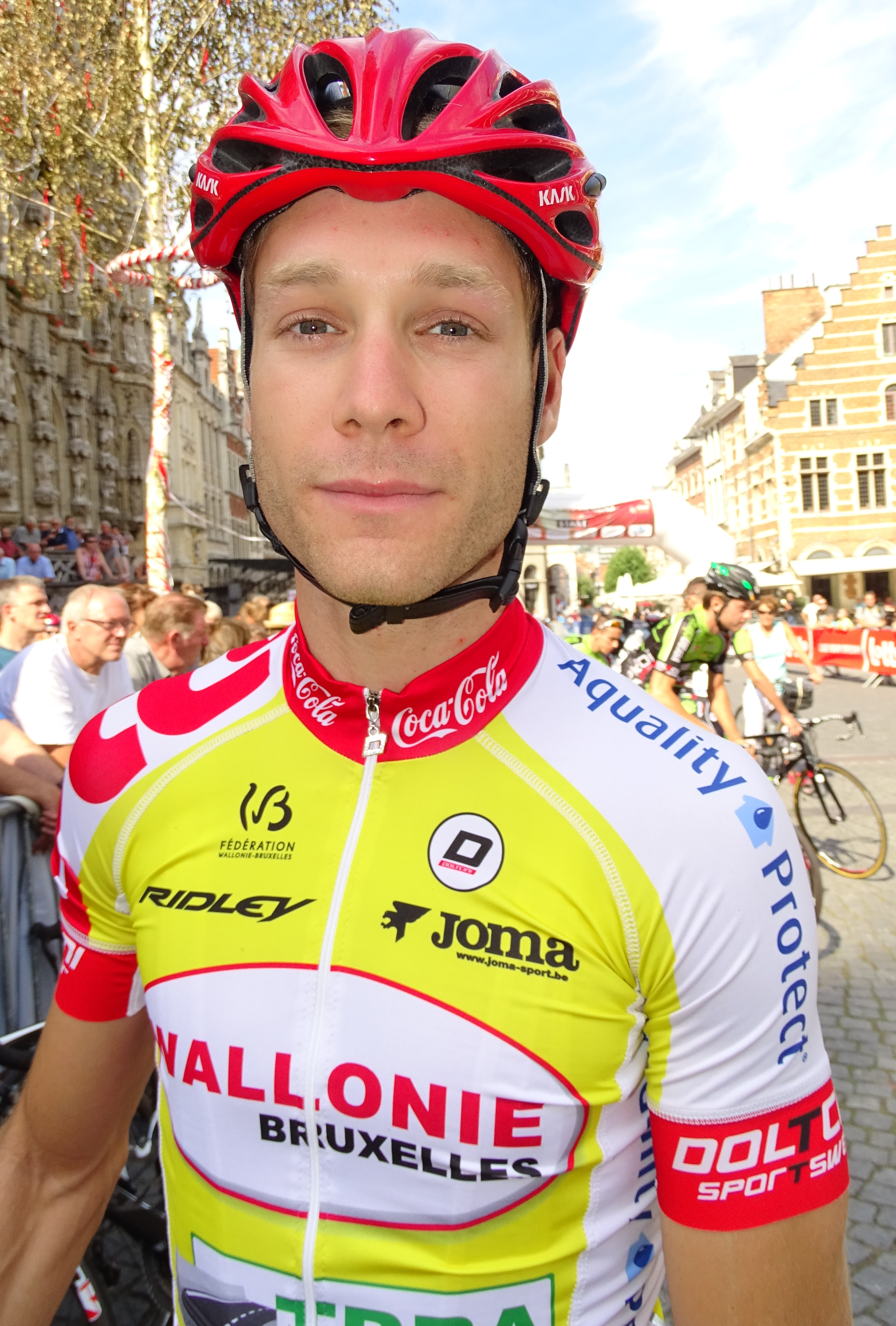
Antoine Demoitié (Wanty–Groupe Gobert) (photographed in 2015)

There was widespread sadness among those involved in professional cycling following Demoitié's death, especially after a second young Belgian cyclist, Roubaix–Métropole Européenne de Lille's Daan Myngheer, died after suffering a heart attack at the Critérium International. Sep Vanmarcke tweeted "Suddenly a 2nd place no longer important after this terrible news." Other riders, especially those in Demoitié's Wanty–Groupe Gobert team, also expressed their sadness. The team's directeur sportif, Hilaire Van der Schueren, paid tribute to his rider, saying that he was "happy because he was a cyclist". Demoitié had made his first appearance at a World Tour race at E3 Harelbeke two days previously and had been in the day's main breakaway. Following his strong performance, he had asked to be allowed to stay in the main peloton in search of a good finish in Wevelgem. The team withdrew from the Three Days of De Panne the following week.

As well as the tributes to Demoitié, many riders also called for improved safety for professional bike races. Many riders had been involved with crashes with race motorbikes in the previous few years, including Peter Sagan, Taylor Phinney, Greg Van Avermaet, Sérgio Paulinho, Jakob Fuglsang, Jesse Sergent, Sylvain Chavanel and Stig Broeckx. Alberto Contador tweeted "Regulations on motos in races are needed NOW", while other riders called for clear rules, speed limits and exams for race motorbike riders. Marcel Kittel described rider safety as an issue that needed the same priority as anti-doping. Wanty–Groupe Gobert's press officer said that the motorbike rider was experienced and was not to blame for the accident. The president of cycling's governing body, the Union Cycliste Internationale (UCI), said that there would be an emergency meeting of its Road Commission to discuss the incident; he also said that they needed to wait for the result of the police enquiry and that it was important to make sure that the "right decisions" were made.

=== Reaction to the race ===
Peter Sagan's victory in the race was his first since winning the rainbow jersey at the world championships road race the previous year. It was the end of what Cycling Weekly called a "frustrating run" that had included second place at E3 Harelbeke two days previously. He said that he was very happy to have won in the rainbow jersey, especially as Gent–Wevelgem was an important race to him. He said that he was determined not to make the same mistake as he had in previous races by working hard in the final part of the race; Kuznetsov's early sprint then set him up for his own sprint.

Vanmarcke said that he was "pleased with second place" as he had had a difficult race. He was trapped in the second echelon when the race split early on and it took a "long pursuit" to get back to the leaders. Although he was not quite able to follow Cancellara and Sagan on the final climb, he rode aggressively on the descent and got back to them. He said that he was very tired at the end of the race and that it was hard to beat Sagan and Cancellara. Cancellara said "for sure it's happy Easter day but it's not happy Gent–Wevelgem day" as he finished fourth out of four riders in the final sprint. He was happy, however, that he had always been at the front of the race and had not crashed. Cyclingnews.com wrote that he would still be the "principal favourite" the following Sunday for the Tour of Flanders.

=== UCI World Tour standings ===
Following his second place in E3 Harelbeke and his victory in Gent–Wevelgem, Sagan moved into the lead of the season-long UCI World Tour competition, seven points ahead of Richie Porte (BMC). Sagan's teammate Alberto Contador had moved up into third place after the Volta a Catalunya; Tinkoff moved into the lead of the teams' rankings. Australia remained at the top of the nations' rankings.

UCI World Tour standings on 27 March 2016
Rank	Rider	Team	Points
1	Peter Sagan (SVK)	Tinkoff	229
2	Richie Porte (AUS)	BMC Racing Team	222
3	Alberto Contador (ESP)	Tinkoff	171
4	Greg Van Avermaet (BEL)	BMC Racing Team	162
5	Arnaud Démare (FRA)	FDJ	137
6	Sergio Henao (COL)	Team Sky	115
7	Simon Gerrans (AUS)	Orica–GreenEDGE	113
8	Nairo Quintana (COL)	Movistar Team	104
9	Geraint Thomas (GBR)	Team Sky	104
10	Michał Kwiatkowski (POL)	Team Sky	102
