= 2017 Tre Valli Varesine =

2017 UCI Europe Tour

Race details
- Dates: 3 October 2017
- Stages: 1
- Distance: 192.9 km (119.9 mi)
- Winning time: 4h 49' 08"

Results
	Winner	Alexandre Geniez (FRA)	(AG2R La Mondiale)
	Second	Thibaut Pinot (FRA)	(FDJ)
	Third	Vincenzo Nibali (ITA)	(Bahrain–Merida)

The 2017 Tre Valli Varesine was the 97th edition of the Tre Valli Varesine road cycling one day race. It was held on 3 October 2017 as part of the 2017 UCI Europe Tour in category 1.HC, over a distance of 192.9 km, starting in Saronno and ending in Varese.

The race was won by Alexandre Geniez of AG2R La Mondiale.

== Teams ==
Twenty-four teams were invited to take part in the race. These included thirteen UCI WorldTeams, seven UCI Professional Continental teams and four UCI Continental teams.

UCI WorldTeams

- AG2R La Mondiale
- Astana
- Bahrain–Merida
- Bora–Hansgrohe
- Cannondale–Drapac
- Team Dimension Data
- FDJ
- Movistar Team
- Orica–Scott
- Team Sky
- Team Sunweb
- Trek–Segafredo
- UAE Team Emirates

UCI Professional Continental Teams

- Bardiani–CSF
- Caja Rural–Seguros RGA
- Gazprom–RusVelo
- Israel Cycling Academy
- Nippo–Vini Fantini
- Wilier Triestina–Selle Italia
- Androni–Sidermec–Bottecchia

UCI Continental Teams

- Amore & Vita–Selle SMP
- D'Amico Utensilnord
- Sangemini–MG.K Vis
- Unieuro Trevigiani–Hemus 1896

== Results ==
Result
Rank	Rider	Team	Time
1	Alexandre Geniez (FRA)	AG2R La Mondiale	4h 49' 08"
2	Thibaut Pinot (FRA)	FDJ	+ 0"
3	Francesco Gavazzi (ITA)	Bahrain–Merida	+ 0"
4	Diego Ulissi (ITA)	UAE Team Emirates	+ 0"
5	Davide Villella (ITA)	Cannondale–Drapac	+ 7"
6	Sam Oomen (NED)	Team Sunweb	+ 7"
7	Gianni Moscon (ITA)	Team Sky	+ 7"
8	Fabio Aru (ITA)	Astana	+ 7"
9	Daniel Martínez (COL)	Wilier Triestina–Selle Italia	+ 17"
10	Michael Albasini (SUI)	Orica–Scott	+ 18"
