= 2018 Tour du Haut Var =

Race details
- Dates: 17–18 February 2018
- Stages: 2
- Distance: 358.2 km (222.6 mi)
- Winning time: 9h 28' 51"

Results
| | Winner | Jonathan Hivert (FRA) |
| | Second | Alexis Vuillermoz (FRA) |
| | Third | Rudy Molard (FRA) |

The 2018 Tour du Haut Var was the 50th edition of the Tour du Haut Var cycle race and was held on 17–18 February 2018. The race started in Le Cannet-des-Maures and finished in Flayosc. The race was won by Jonathan Hivert.

== General classification ==
Final general classification

| Rank | Rider | Time |
|---|---|---|
| 1 | Jonathan Hivert (FRA) | 9h 28' 51" |
| 2 | Alexis Vuillermoz (FRA) | + 1" |
| 3 | Rudy Molard (FRA) | + 1" |
| 4 | Valentin Madouas (FRA) | + 3" |
| 5 | Thibaut Pinot (FRA) | + 3" |
| 6 | Mauro Finetto (ITA) | + 13" |
| 7 | Nicola Bagioli (ITA) | + 39" |
| 8 | Quentin Pacher (FRA) | + 39" |
| 9 | Dorian Godon (FRA) | + 39" |
| 10 | Andriy Hrivko (UKR) | + 39" |
