= Thibaut Pinot =

French racing cyclist (born 1990)

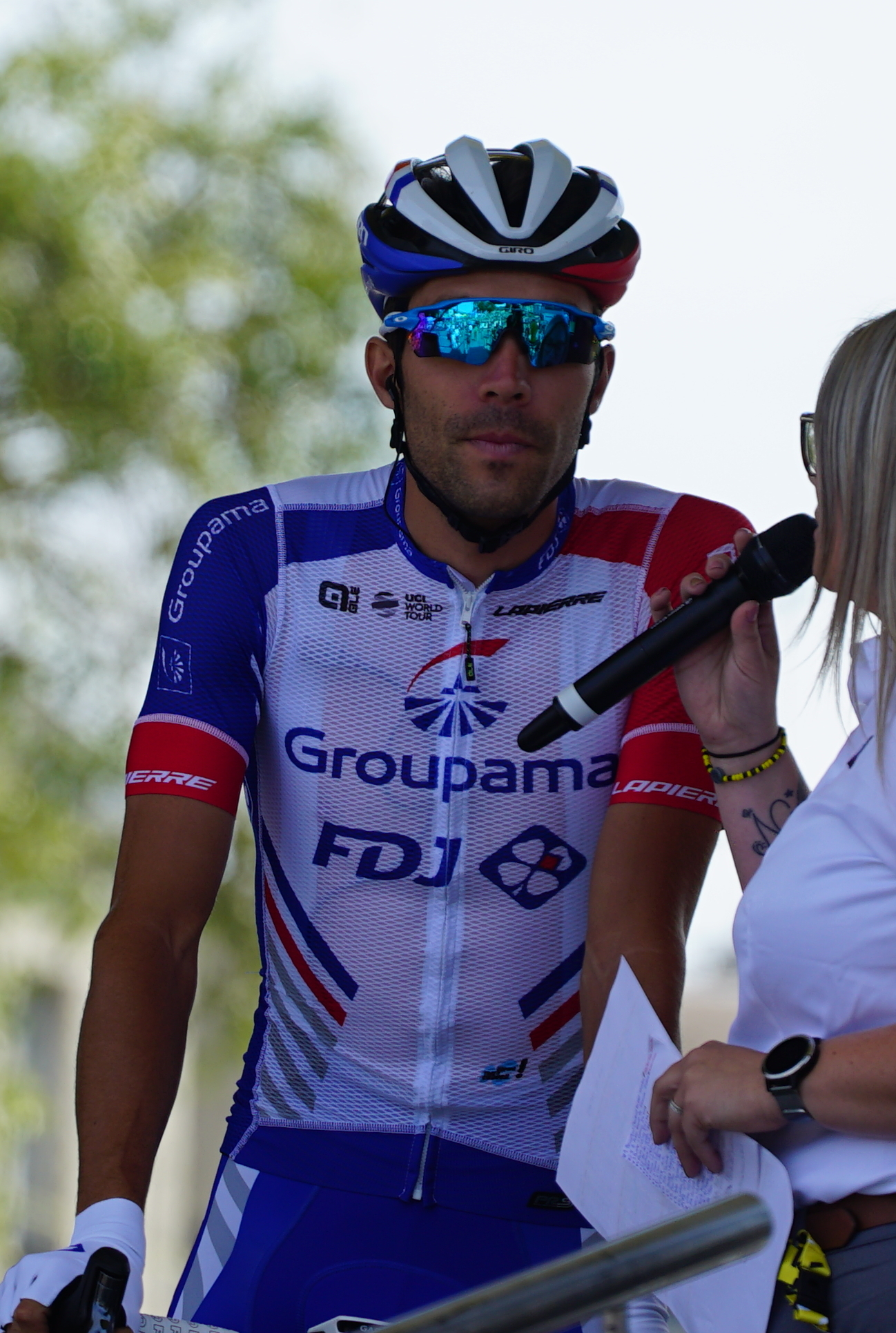
- Pinot at the 2019 Tour de France

Personal information
- Full name: Thibaut Pinot
- Nickname: Pinot Noir
- Born: 29 May 1990 (age 36) Lure, France
- Height: 1.80 m (5 ft 11 in)
- Weight: 63 kg (139 lb; 9 st 13 lb)

Cycling career
- Sport: Cycling
- Discipline: Road
- Role: Rider
- Rider type: Climber

Amateur teams
- 2008: AC Bisontine
- 2009: CC Étupes

Professional team
- 2010–2023: Française des Jeux

Major wins
- Grand Tours Tour de France Young rider classification (2014) 3 individual stages (2012, 2015, 2019) Giro d'Italia Mountains classification (2023) 1 individual stage (2017) Vuelta a España 2 individual stages (2018) Stage races Critérium International (2016) Tour of the Alps (2018) One-day races and Classics National Time Trial Championships (2016) Giro di Lombardia (2018) Milano–Torino (2018)

Thibaut Pinot (French pronunciation: [tibo pino]; born 29 May 1990) is a French former professional road cyclist, who competed as a professional from 2010 to 2023, spending his entire career with Française des Jeux. Once considered one of the most promising talents in French cycling, he finished third overall in the 2014 Tour de France and first in the young rider classification. He has won stages in all three Grand Tours, with 3 in the Tour de France, 1 in the Giro d'Italia and 2 in the Vuelta a España. Pinot has taken more than thirty professional victories, including the Giro di Lombardia in 2018, and he won the mountains classification at the 2023 Giro d'Italia.

== Career ==
=== 2010 ===
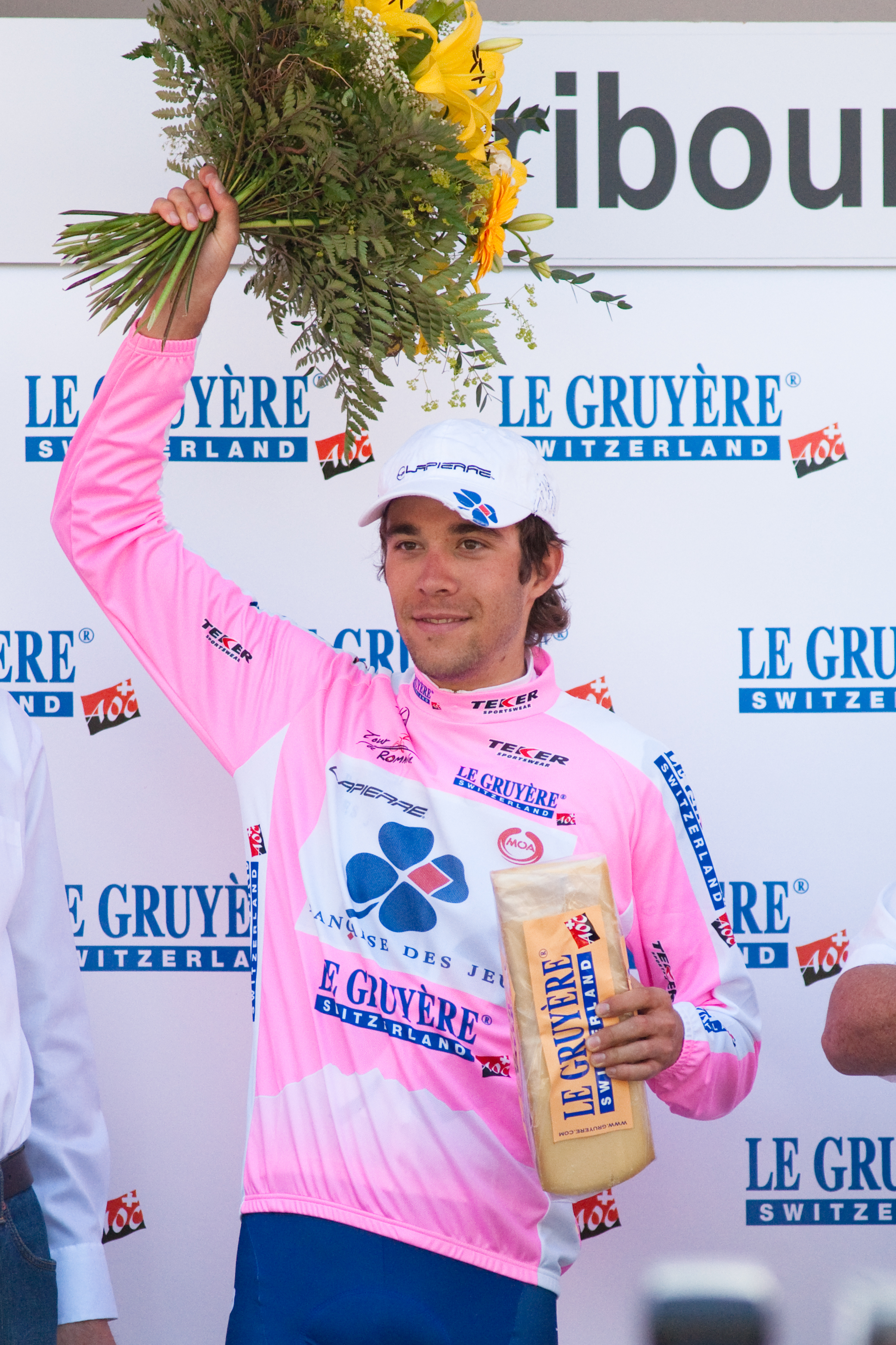
Pinot at the 2010 Tour de Romandie

Lure-born Pinot turned professional in 2010 with the Française des Jeux team, having signed an initial two-year contract with the team. In his first season, he won the mountains classification at the Tour de Romandie and Paris–Corrèze, and recorded fifth-place finishes at the Tour de l'Ain, and the Tour du Finistère.

=== 2011 ===
At the 2011 Tour of Turkey, Pinot was part of a ten-rider breakaway on the fifth stage that finished twelve minutes clear of the peloton (having also been part of the breakaway on the previous stage), and ultimately finished the race in third overall. He then finished second to Sylvain Georges in his next start, at the Rhône-Alpes Isère Tour, winning the mountains and young rider classifications. He finished second to Joaquim Rodríguez on the final stage of the Critérium du Dauphiné in June, before winning the Tour Alsace on the final stage in July with a stage victory atop the Col du Ballon d'Alsace. He then won two stages at the Tour de l'Ain in August, including the final stage summit finish at the Col du Grand Colombier; he also held the overall lead for a day after his first stage win. At the end of the month, he soloed to an opening stage victory at the Settimana Ciclistica Lombarda, where he then held on to the overall lead of the race until its conclusion three days later.

=== 2012 ===
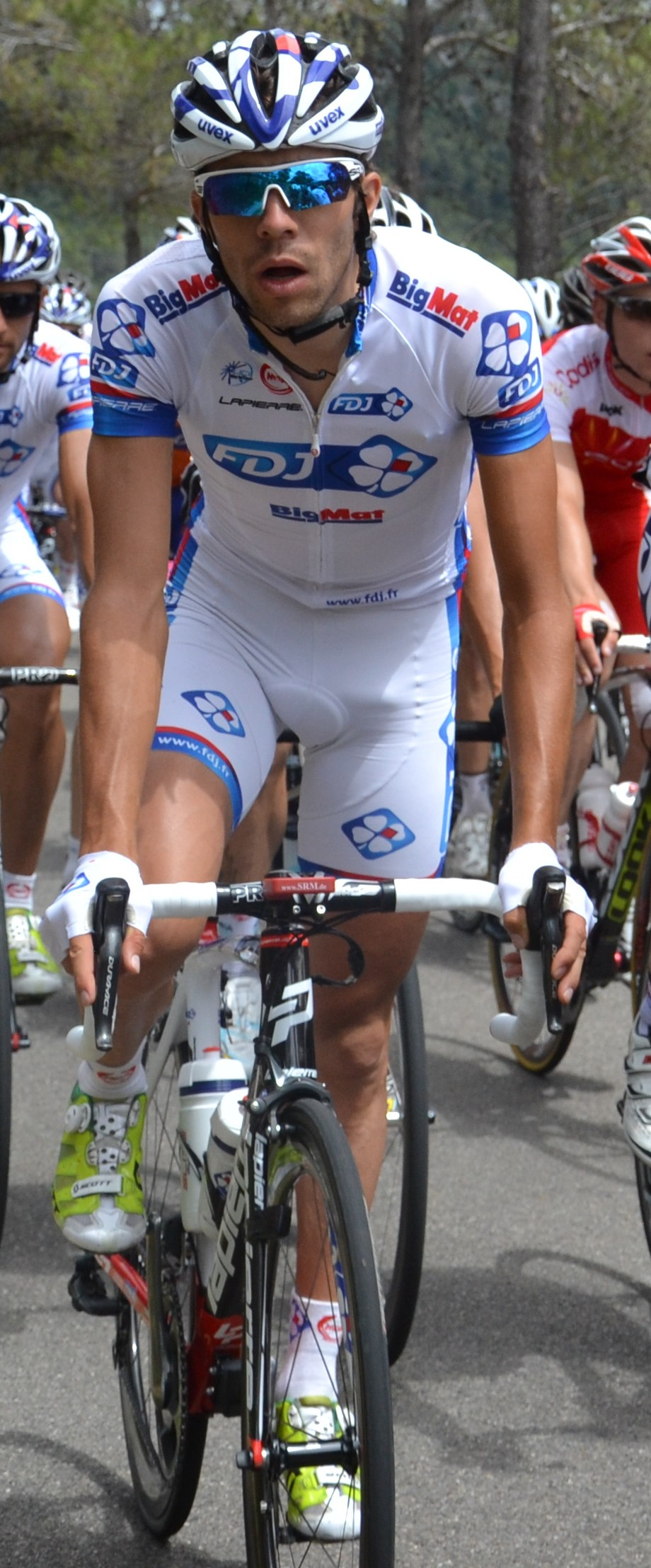
Pinot at the 2012 Tour de France

Pinot, aged 22 was the youngest rider in the Tour de France. He took a prestigious victory on the eighth stage from Belfort to Porrentruy, which comprised seven categorized climbs including the Category 1 Col de la Croix, where he passed Fredrik Kessiakoff (Astana) shortly before the summit, with 16 kilometres (9.9 miles) remaining. He then negotiated the descent and the flat portion of road, holding on to a lead of 26 seconds over the chasing group – which included some of the Tour's general classification contenders – despite a headwind and while being frantically encouraged by his team manager, Marc Madiot. Despite being the youngest rider at the Tour, he managed to finish 10th overall in the final general classification. At 22 years and 54 days, he became the youngest rider to finish in the top 10 since Raymond Impanis (aged 21 years, 8 months) in 1947. Following the Tour de France, Pinot took a stage victory on the final day of the Tour de l'Ain.

=== 2013 ===
Having started out the season with finishes of 8th overall at the Volta a Catalunya and 4th overall at Tour de Suisse, there were high hopes for Pinot in July at the centenary edition of the Tour de France. However, when the race hit the mountains, Pinot was struggling and was over half an hour down in the general classification after Stage 9. In the second week of the race, Pinot had problems with a sore throat and also admitted he was struggling on the descents, having a fear of speed. He abandoned the race prior to stage 16. Having finished sixth at the Tour de l'Ain, Pinot looked to redeem himself in the Vuelta a España, and got better throughout the race, moving into the top ten overall ahead of the first rest day. On the penultimate stage to the Alto de l'Angliru, Pinot climbed up to 7th place overall, which was also his finishing position in Madrid.

=== 2014 ===
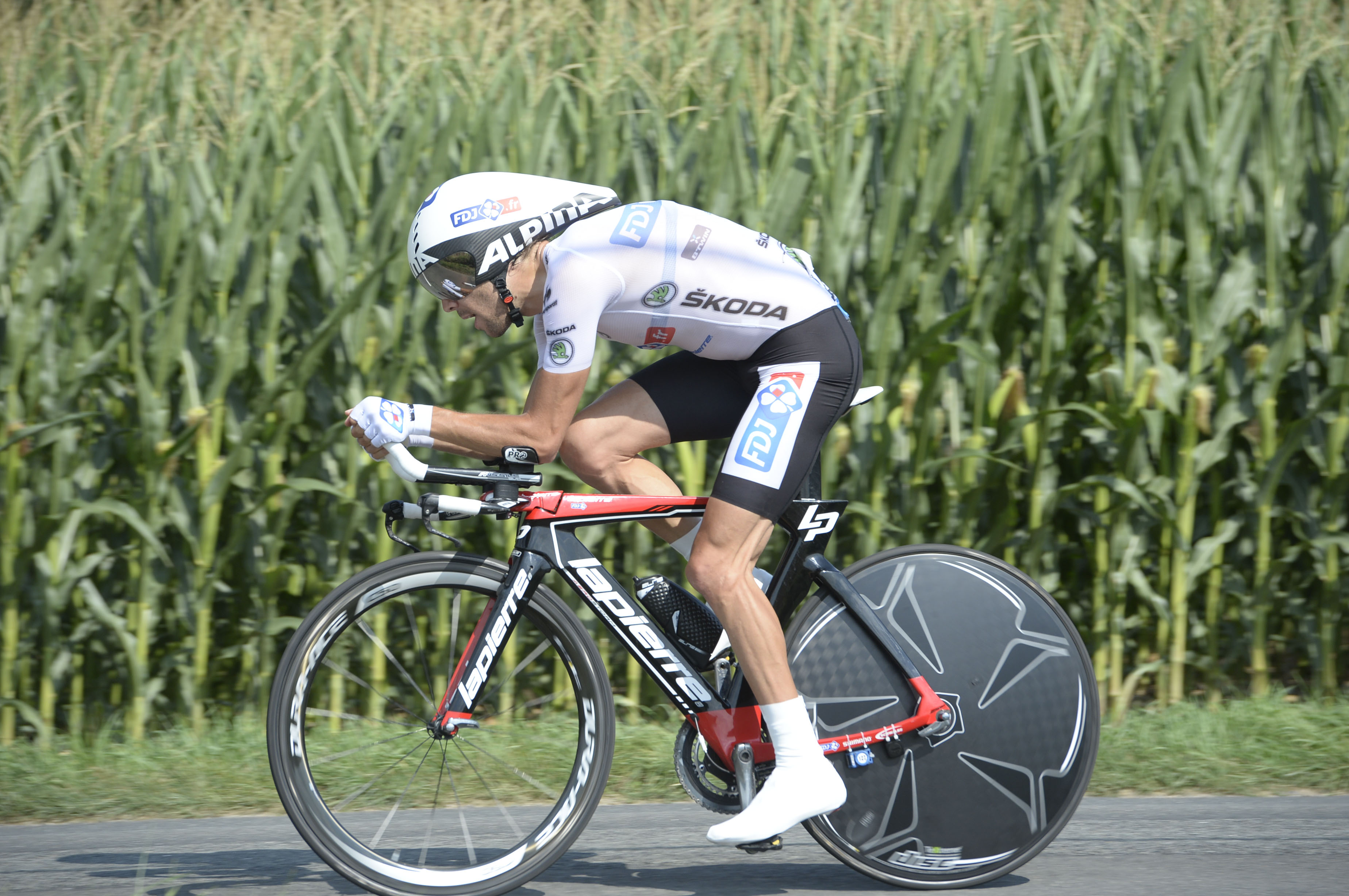
Pinot, wearing the white jersey of the young rider classification leader, at the 2014 Tour de France – he would go on to win the jersey in Paris

In the spring, Pinot took top-ten overall finishes at the Tour of the Basque Country, the Tour de Romandie, and the Bayern Rundfahrt. At the Tour de France, Pinot won the white jersey for being the best young rider and finished in third place in the final general classification, behind Vincenzo Nibali (1st) and Jean-Christophe Péraud (2nd). He and Péraud became the first Frenchmen to finish in the top three overall in the Tour de France since Richard Virenque finished as the runner-up overall in 1997. It was the first time in 30 years that two Frenchmen finished in the top three overall in the Tour de France – Laurent Fignon (winner) and Bernard Hinault (runner-up) finished in the top two overall in 1984. He then rode the Vuelta a España, but withdrew midway through the race. He finished the season with a fourth-place finish at both the Tour du Doubs, and the Tour du Gévaudan Languedoc-Roussillon, winning the young rider classification at the latter.

=== 2015 ===
In March, he finished fourth overall at Tirreno–Adriatico, and then finished second to Jean-Christophe Péraud at Critérium International (also winning the white jersey as winner of the young rider classification). Pinot had his first victory of the season at the Tour de Romandie. He won the queen stage of the race with seven seconds of an advantage over his nearest pursuer, Ilnur Zakarin of Team Katusha. He finished fourth in the general classification and won the white jersey as the young rider classification winner. In June, as he was preparing for the Tour de France, he participated in the Tour de Suisse and won the queen stage, a long and difficult event featuring a mountaintop finish atop the Rettenbach glacier. He held the race lead by 34 seconds going into the final stage, a 38.4-kilometre (23.9-mile) individual time trial that started and finished in Bern. However, he lost at least a minute to his closest challengers Geraint Thomas and Simon Špilak, and also fell behind Tom Dumoulin to finish in fourth place overall.

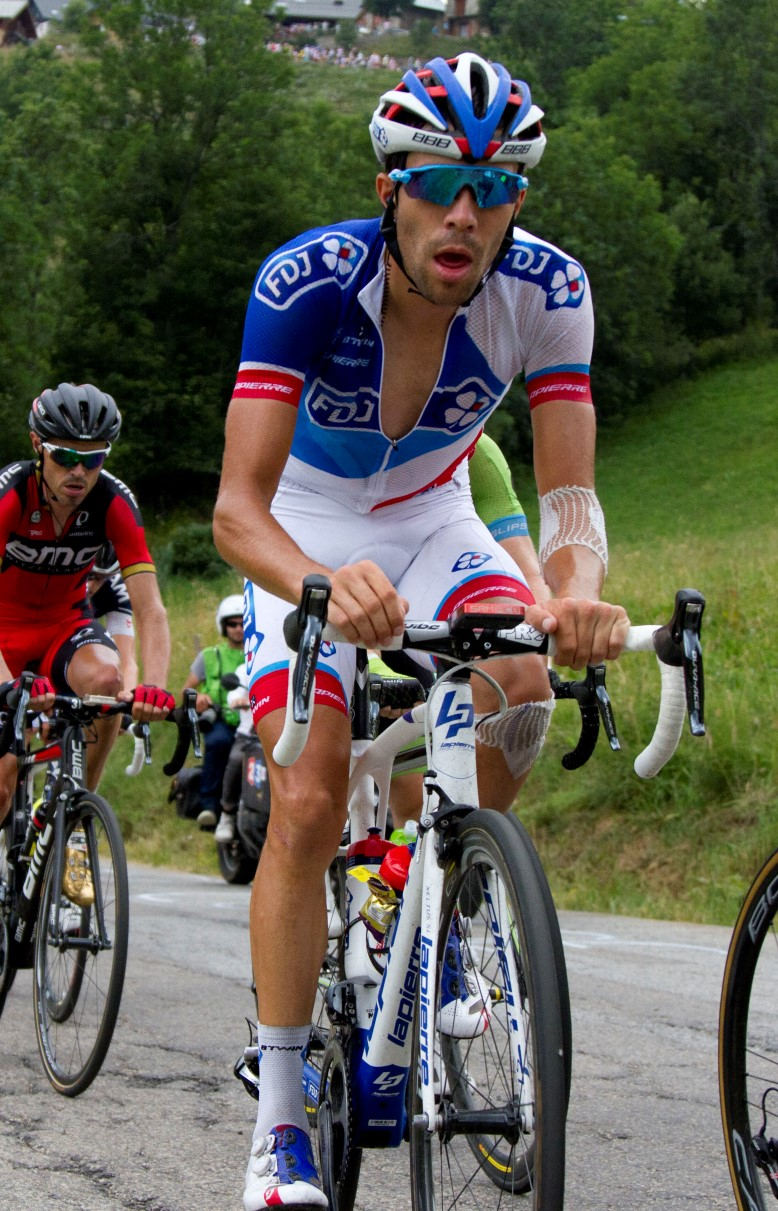
Pinot at the 2015 Tour de France

At the Tour de France, Pinot lost considerable time in the first week due to crashes and mechanical issues, yet he won Stage 20 – which finished at Alpe d'Huez – in solo fashion and finished 16th in the final general classification. He competed in the warm-up event for the 2016 Summer Olympics, the International Road Cycling Challenge in Rio de Janeiro, where he finished in sixth position. In September, Pinot won the Tour du Gévaudan Languedoc-Roussillon (his first stage race win since 2011); he won the opening stage in a two-up sprint against Thomas Voeckler on the uphill finish at the Col de Pierre Plate, and then finished second to Alexis Vuillermoz on the final stage in Mende. He finished his season competing in a pair of Italian races – he finished fourth in Milano–Torino, before recording his first Monument classic podium finish with third place in Il Lombardia, a result that he was "proud" with.

=== 2016 ===
During the first half of the 2016 season, Pinot recorded a run of seven consecutive race starts where he finished in the top-five placings. He finished second to Dries Devenyns in a sprint à deux at the Grand Prix d'Ouverture La Marseillaise, and then finished third overall at the Étoile de Bessèges after a second-place finish on the final individual time trial stage. He finished fourth overall at the Volta ao Algarve and then fifth overall at Tirreno–Adriatico. At Critérium International, Pinot won a 7-kilometre (4.3-mile) individual time trial around Porto-Vecchio to take the race lead, before winning the final stage the following day, a summit finish on the Col de l'Ospedale. After a fourth-place overall finish at the Tour of the Basque Country, Pinot won the third stage – a 15.11-kilometre (9.39-mile) individual time trial in Sion – at the Tour de Romandie; he moved up to second overall behind Nairo Quintana, staying there for the remainder of the race. He out-sprinted Romain Bardet to win a stage of the Critérium du Dauphiné at the ski resort of Méribel, and he also won the French National Time Trial Championships, ahead of the Tour de France. Following this success, he signed a two-year contract extension with FDJ.

At the Tour de France however, Pinot lost a little over three minutes to other general classification contenders on stage 7 to Lac de Payolle. Pinot simply said it was his bad legs, as he was seen struggling on the final climb of the Col d'Aspin. On the following stage, Pinot rebounded and went into the breakaway; he and Rafał Majka battled it out for points for the mountains jersey, with Majka taking the lead in the competition by one point, and he lost 16 minutes to stage winner Chris Froome. On stage 9 he was yet again in the breakaway with Majka, but Pinot managed to edge out Majka, to wear the polka dot jersey from stage 10. However, Pinot performed badly in the polka-dot jersey on stage 12 and withdrew from the race ahead of stage 13. On 1 September, Pinot announced his season's end on Twitter, citing "persistent fatigue due to a virus" and "in order to prepare best for the next season" as the reasons for his decision to end his season prematurely.

=== 2017 ===
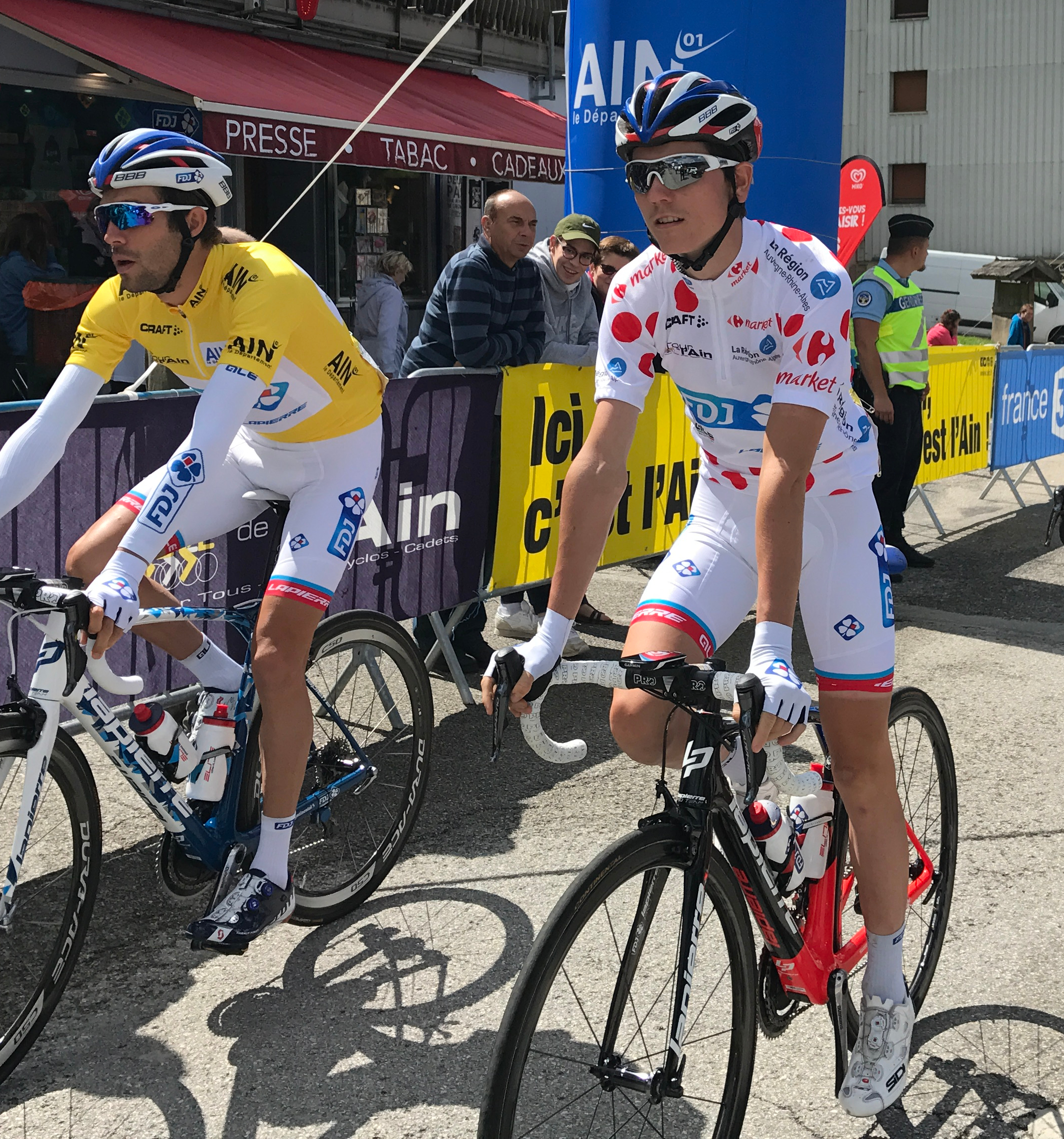
Pinot (left) and teammate David Gaudu at the 2017 Tour de l'Ain. Pinot won the general and mountains classifications, with Gaudu finishing second in both.

The first win of Pinot's 2017 campaign came at the Vuelta a Andalucía, as he rode past Alberto Contador in the final hundred metres of the second stage. Pinot finished the race in third position overall, and went on to ride Strade Bianche for the first time, in which he finished ninth. Pinot then finished third overall at the Tirreno–Adriatico a week later, losing a place on the final stage to Rohan Dennis. As Pinot was targeting the centenary edition of the Giro d'Italia, his last preparation race was the Tour of the Alps. He recorded top-five stage finishes on each of the five stages, including a stage win on the final stage to Trento, as he finished second overall behind Geraint Thomas. At the Giro d'Italia, Pinot recorded a fourth-place finish at Mount Etna on stage four and a second-place finish at Blockhaus on stage nine, which saw him rise to second in the general classification behind Nairo Quintana. After dropping to fourth overall on the following stage, Pinot remained in third or fourth overall for the remainder of the race. He won the penultimate stage to Asiago, winning a sprint from a small group of riders, and went into the final stage – a 29.3-kilometre (18.2-mile) individual time trial into Milan from the Monza Circuit – with a ten-second margin over Tom Dumoulin for the final podium place. Dumoulin overhauled Pinot, Vincenzo Nibali and Quintana for the race victory, with Pinot missing out on the podium in fourth place.

Having been unable to defend his title at the French National Time Trial Championships, Pinot rode the Tour de France but finished no higher than ninth on a stage, and abandoned the race during stage 17 on the Col de la Croix de Fer. In August, Pinot won the Tour de l'Ain ahead of his teammate David Gaudu; Gaudu won the third stage in Oyonnax ahead of Pinot with Pinot moving into the race lead, and then cemented his race victory with a further second-place stage finish to Alexandre Geniez on the final stage in Culoz. He finished the season off by riding the Italian autumn classics; he finished in second place at Tre Valli Varesine (again beaten by Geniez), fifth place at Il Lombardia, and also finished inside the top-ten placings at the Giro dell'Emilia and Milano–Torino.

=== 2018 ===
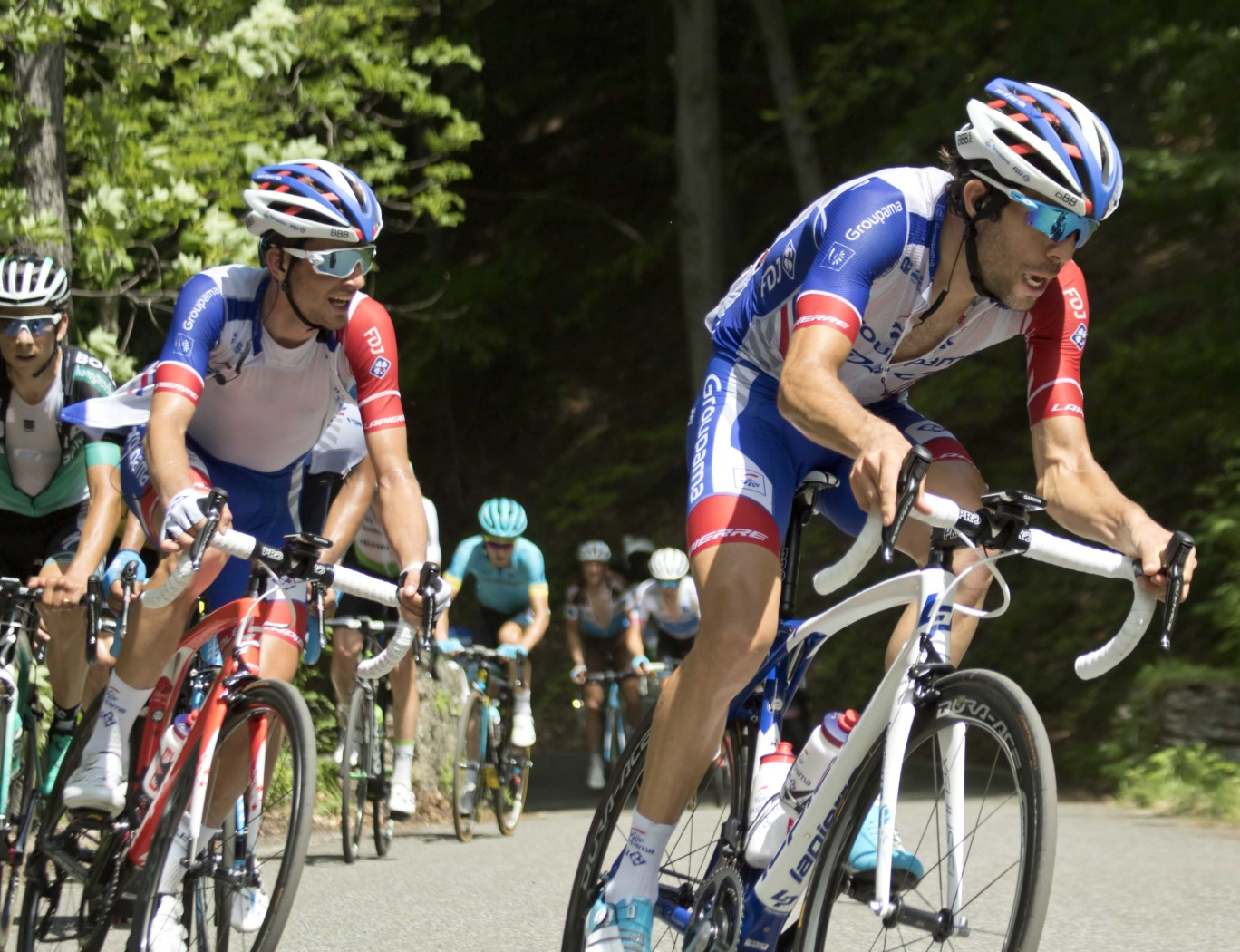
Pinot at the 2018 Giro d'Italia

Going into the 2018 season, Pinot was yet again targeting the Giro d'Italia; but he was also looking to reduce his number of race days before the race in other to arrive more fresh at the Tour de France. Prior to the Giro d'Italia, Pinot contested 14 days of racing – at the Tour du Haut Var (fifth overall), the Volta a Catalunya (tenth overall), and the Tour of the Alps, which he won. At the Giro d'Italia, Pinot recorded four top-three stage finishes, and with two stages remaining, was lying third overall in the general classification. However, on the penultimate stage, he faltered on the penultimate first-category climb – the Col de Saint-Pantaléon – and within the last 50 kilometres (31 miles) of the stage, lost more than 45 minutes to the stage winner, Mikel Nieve. He was hospitalised post-stage in Aosta due to dehydration, exhaustion, fever and respiratory problems. Having dropped to 16th overall, Pinot abandoned the race before the start of the final stage. Unable to fully recover from the fatigue and pneumonia suffered during the Giro d'Italia, Pinot's Groupama–FDJ team announced that he would not ride the Tour de France.

His next race was at the Tour de Pologne, where he finished on the podium in third place overall, having recorded a second-place finish on the hilly final stage. He then rode the Vuelta a España for the first time since 2014, where he lost time in the opening week due to a combination of crosswinds and crashes on stage 6. He was part of the breakaway on stage 11, and held the virtual race lead for most of the stage, but ultimately only gained 12 seconds on the day to the general classification contenders. He finished fourth on stage 14, before taking victory on the following stage, which finished at the Lakes of Covadonga. He attacked with approximately 6 kilometres (3.7 miles) remaining, soloing clear to a 28-second victory over his closest competitor, Miguel Ángel López, giving him stage wins at all three Grand Tours. He added a second stage victory on stage 19 in Andorra, pulling clear of Simon Yates in the closing metres, and ultimately finished the race in sixth overall. At the end of the month, he finished ninth in the road race at the UCI Road World Championships in Austria. In October, Pinot won both Milano–Torino and Il Lombardia, with solo moves of approximately 1 kilometre (0.62 miles) and 14 kilometres (8.7 miles) respectively.

=== 2019 ===
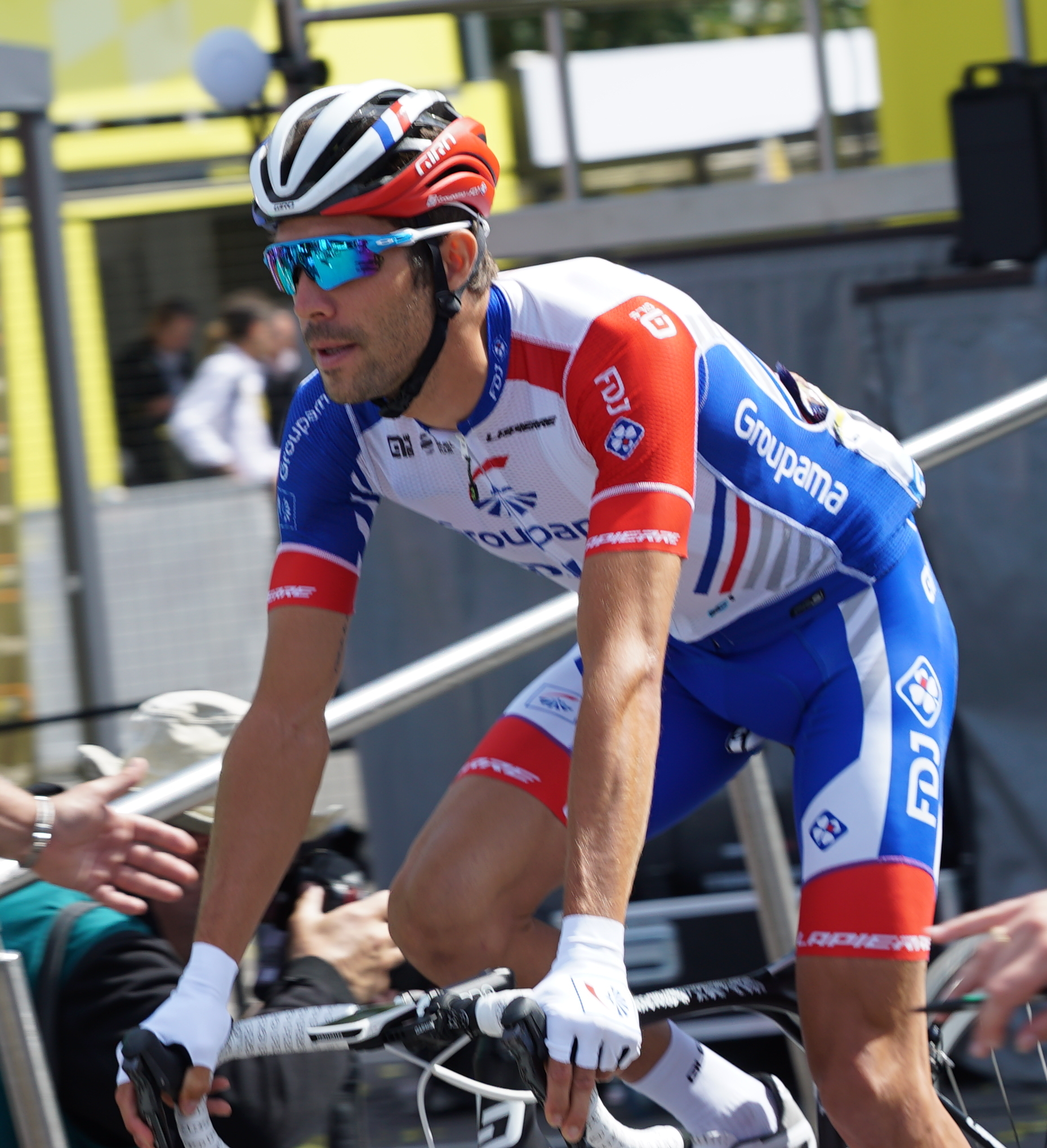
Pinot at the 2019 Tour de France

Pinot started his season in February at the Tour de la Provence, where he finished in fourth place, before taking the overall victory at the Tour du Haut Var with a final-stage victory at Mont Faron. He finished in fifth place in the UCI World Tour races Tirreno–Adriatico and the Critérium du Dauphiné, either side of his second overall victory at the Tour de l'Ain, where he also won the final stage to the Col du Grand Colombier, as well as the points and mountains classifications. At the Tour de France, he moved up to third overall by the second weekend of the race before dropping outside the top-ten placings ahead of the first race day. He worked his way back up the general classification, and won stage 14, which finished on the Col du Tourmalet, and according to The Guardian, Pinot was seen to be the biggest rival to the Team INEOS pairing of Egan Bernal and Geraint Thomas. Unfortunately he suffered an injury late on stage 18 – a torn quadriceps – and this forced him to abandon the race the following day, prior to the stage being neutralised due to a landslide. In September, he announced the end to his campaign to prepare for the 2020 season.

=== 2020–2022 ===
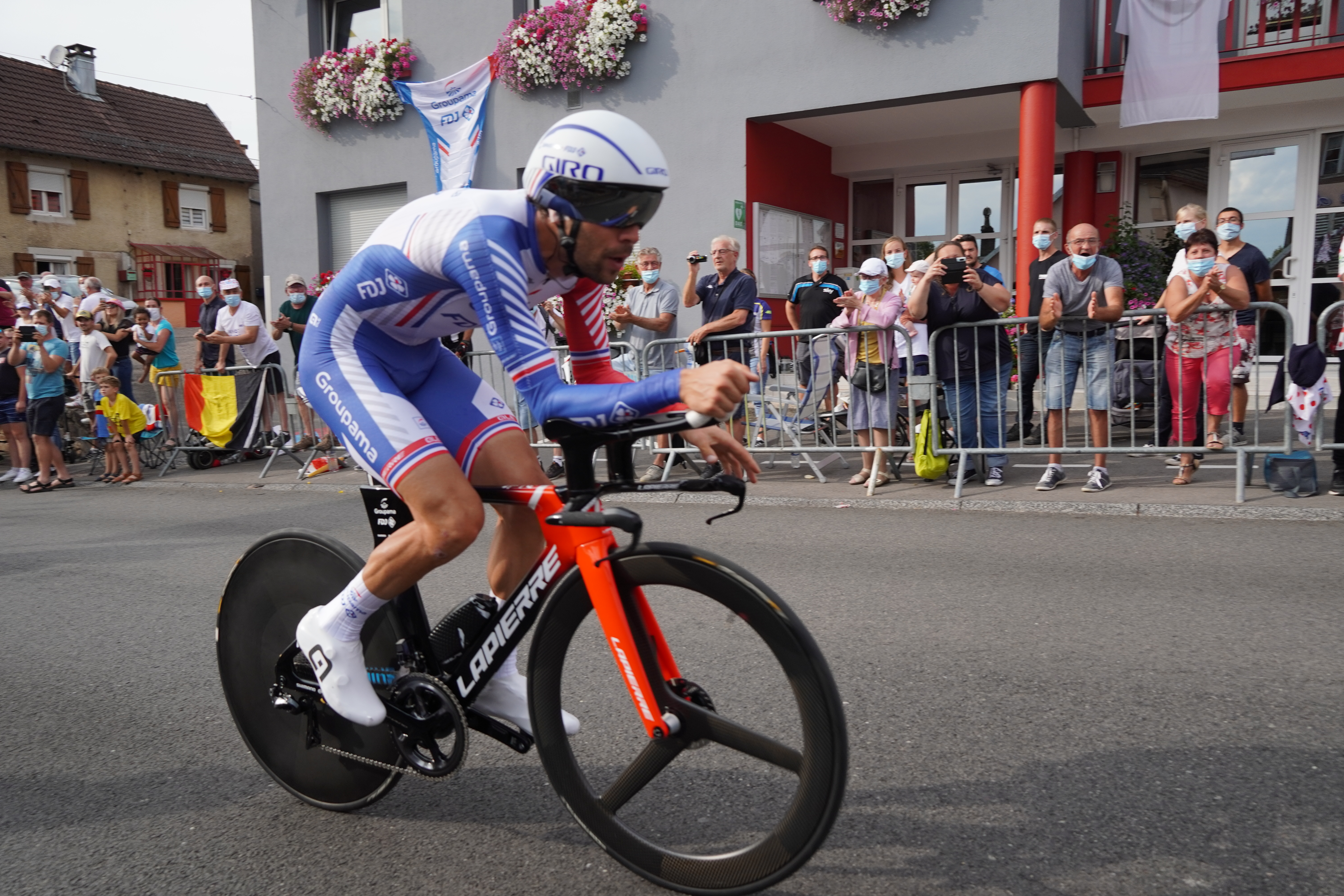
Pinot at the 2020 Tour de France

Prior to the COVID-19 pandemic-enforced suspension of racing in March 2020, Pinot took three top-ten overall finishes from as many starts, at the Tour de la Provence (seventh), the Tour des Alpes-Maritimes et du Var (sixth), and Paris–Nice (fifth in his inaugural start). After racing resumed in August, Pinot contested the Route d'Occitanie and the Critérium du Dauphiné as warm-up races for the delayed Tour de France, finishing fourth and second respectively. He struggled with back issues during the Tour de France, following a crash on the opening stage, losing 25 minutes in the general classification, prior to the first rest day. His only other start came at the Vuelta a España, where he withdrew after two stages due to lingering back issues.

For the 2021 season, Pinot had initially targeted to compete in the Giro d'Italia and to miss the Tour de France. However, his back injury from 2020 was continuing to effect his progress as he recorded only one top-ten race finish in the first few months of the season, with eighth at the Ardèche Classic. Following the Tour of the Alps, it was announced that Pinot would skip the Giro d'Italia due to the back issues. Following this, Pinot did not return to racing until August's Tour du Limousin. He recorded fifth-place finishes at the Classic Grand Besançon Doubs and the Coppa Bernocchi one-day races, and he finished seventh overall at the Tour de Luxembourg in between.

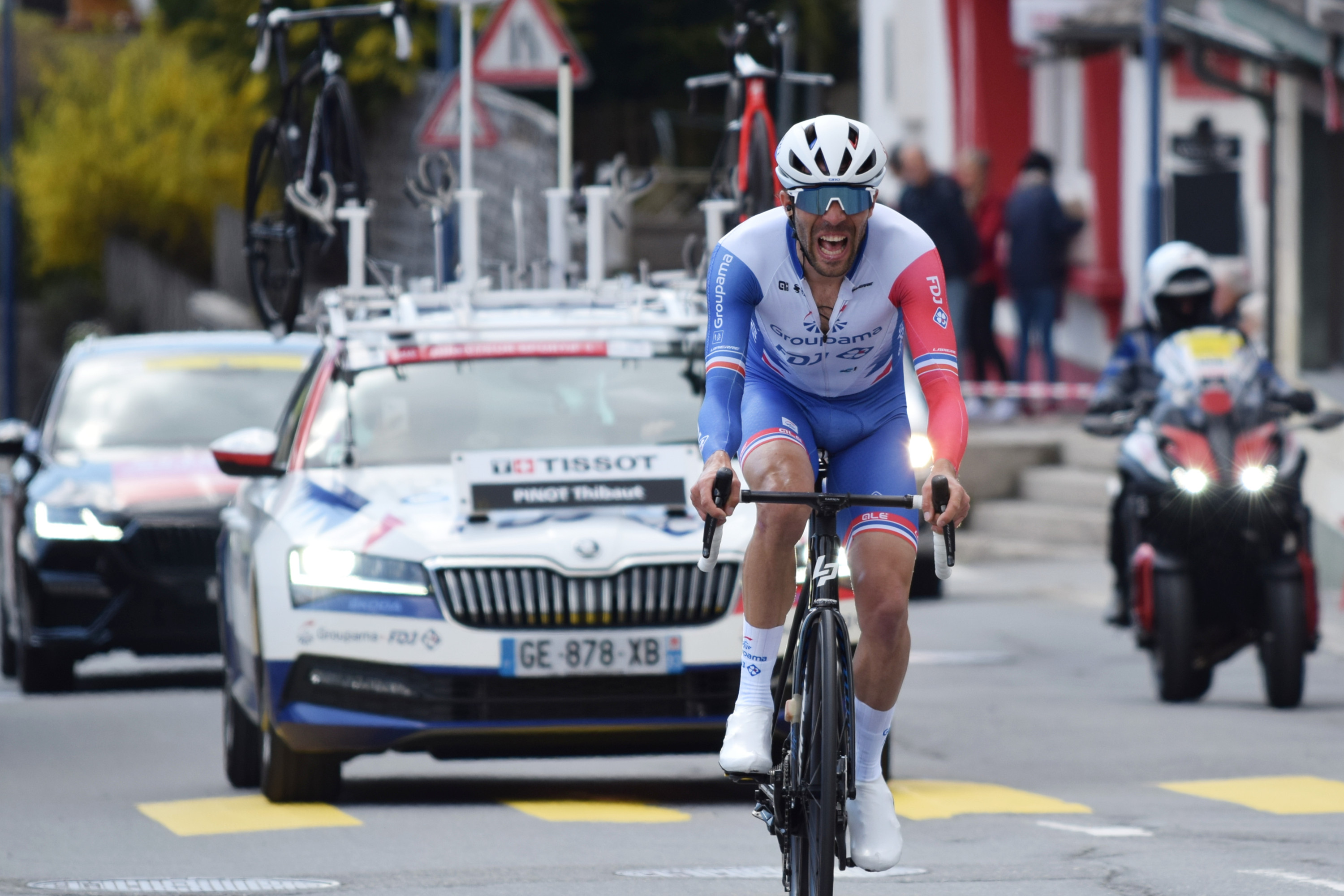
Pinot at the 2022 Tour de Romandie

Having finished in the top ten overall at March's Tirreno–Adriatico (in eighth place), Pinot's first success in almost three years came the following month, winning the final stage of the 2022 Tour of the Alps; having finished second to Miguel Ángel López the previous day, Pinot got the better of David de la Cruz in the closing stages in Lienz. He added another stage victory at June's Tour de Suisse, winning the penultimate stage into Malbun in Liechtenstein, having spent most of the day in the breakaway. In the Grand Tours, he made it into the breakaway on three stages at both the Tour de France and the Vuelta a España, recording overall finishes of fourteenth and seventeenth respectively.

=== 2023 ===
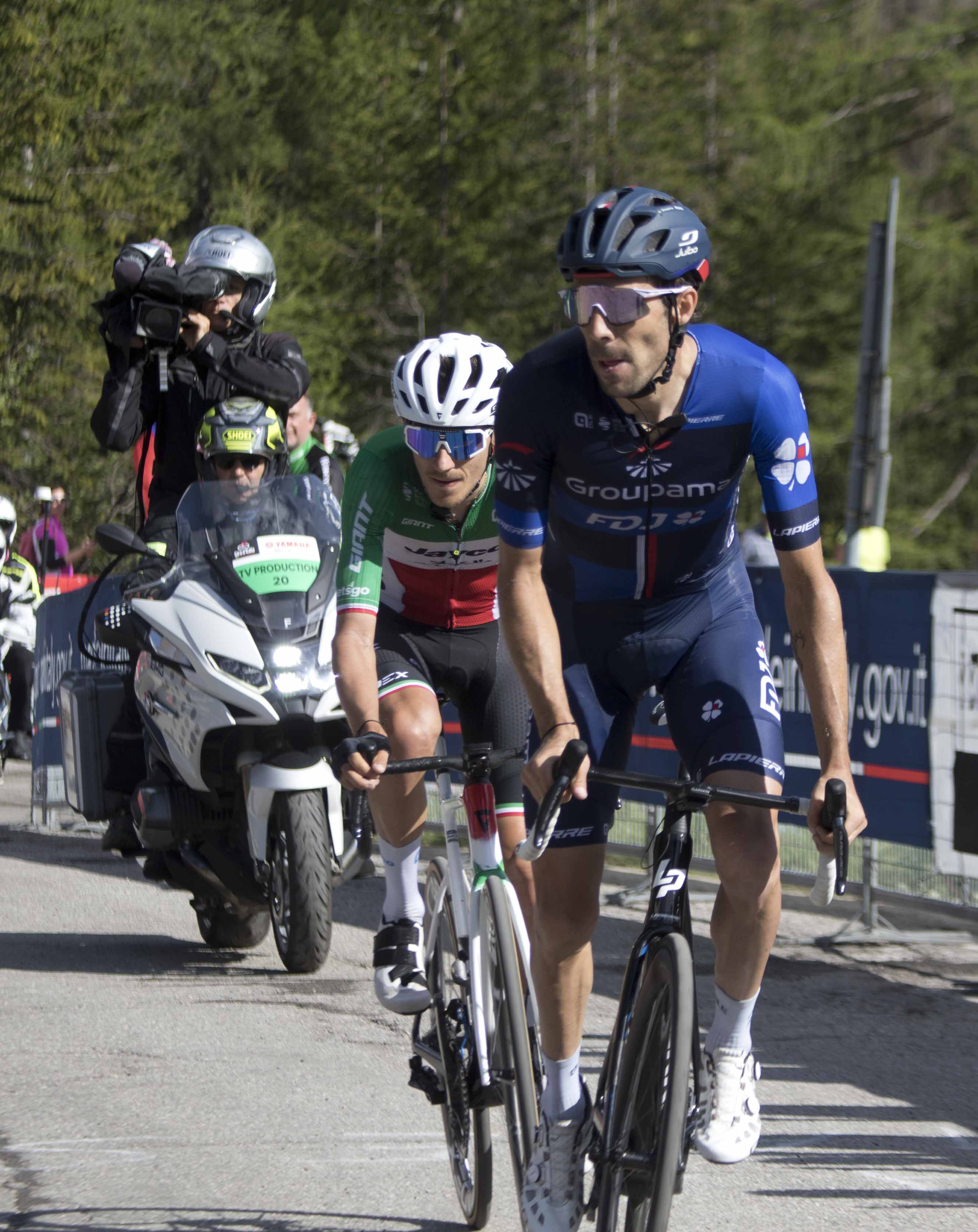
Pinot leads Filippo Zana during stage 18 of the 2023 Giro d'Italia. Zana out-sprinted Pinot for the stage victory, with Pinot taking the blue jersey as the leader of the mountains classification.

In January, Pinot announced that he would retire from the sport at the end of the 2023 season. He started his season at February's Étoile de Bessèges, where he finished in sixth place overall. In April, he recorded three top-five finishes in as many days at the Classic Grand Besançon Doubs (fifth), the Tour du Jura (second to Kévin Vauquelin), and the Tour du Doubs (second to Jesús Herrada). Ahead of the Giro d'Italia, Pinot also contested the Tour de Romandie, where he finished in fifth place overall after a second-place stage finish on the penultimate day – a summit finish to Thyon.

Pinot led Groupama–FDJ at the Giro d'Italia, and on stage three, took the blue jersey as leader of the mountains classification, having attacked on the two categorised climbs within the last 35 kilometres (22 miles) of the stage. He held the lead of the classification for four days, when Davide Bais took the lead following his stage victory at Campo Imperatore. Pinot regained the classification lead on a shortened stage 13, which was reduced to approximately 75 kilometres (47 miles) and entirely held in Switzerland, due to safety concerns. He had been part of a three-rider breakaway with Einer Rubio and Jefferson Alexander Cepeda; Pinot and Cepeda traded attacks, and were both beaten to the line by Rubio. After Bais and then Ben Healy took over the blue jersey, Pinot regained the jersey definitively on stage 18, as he was once again beaten into second place on the stage, by Filippo Zana in Val di Zoldo. In the final two mountain stages, Pinot worked his way up from seventh overall to a fifth-place overall finish in Rome; he was 5 minutes, 43 seconds down on race winner Primož Roglič.

== Personal life ==
Pinot lives with his partner Charlotte Patat at a hobby farm, in Mélisey. His brother, Julien Pinot, also competed as a cyclist and works as a directeur sportif for Groupama–FDJ United. His father, Régis Pinot, has been the mayor of Mélisey since 2008.

In 2020 and 2021, the French band Jaune Mayo recorded two songs called "Tibopino" and "Tibopino Tibogiro", dedicated to the cyclist.

Pinot is a fan of football club Paris Saint-Germain (PSG). He has expressed support for the club's ultras movement, and has stated that he "loves attending football matches", particularly in the Parc des Princes's Auteuil stand among PSG ultras.

== Career achievements ==
=== Major results ===
2009
1st Overall Giro della Valle d'Aosta
1st Tour du Canton de Mareuil Verteillac
1st Grand Prix de la ville de Delle
8th Overall Tour des Pays de Savoie

1st Stage 3

2010
1st Mountains classification, Tour de Romandie
1st Mountains classification, Paris–Corrèze
5th Overall Tour de l'Ain
5th Tour du Finistère
2011 (4 pro wins)
1st Overall Settimana Ciclistica Lombarda

1st Young rider classification
1st Stage 1

1st Overall Tour Alsace

1st Young rider classification
1st Stage 5

Tour de l'Ain

1st Stages 2 & 4

2nd Overall Rhône-Alpes Isère Tour

1st Mountains classification
1st Young rider classification

3rd Overall Tour of Turkey
3rd Tre Valli Varesine
7th Overall Bayern Rundfahrt

1st Young rider classification

9th Gran Premio Bruno Beghelli
2012 (2)
1st Stage 5 Tour de l'Ain
10th Overall Tour de France

1st Stage 8

2013
4th Overall Tour de Suisse
6th Overall Tour de l'Ain
7th Overall Vuelta a España
8th Overall Volta a Catalunya
2014
3rd Overall Tour de France

1st Young rider classification

4th Overall Tour du Gévaudan Languedoc-Roussillon

1st Young rider classification

4th Tour du Doubs
5th Overall Bayern Rundfahrt

1st Young rider classification

9th Overall Tour of the Basque Country
9th Grand Prix de Wallonie
10th Overall Tour de Romandie
2015 (5)
1st Overall Tour du Gévaudan Languedoc-Roussillon

1st Points classification
1st Stage 1

1st Stage 20 Tour de France
2nd Overall Critérium International

1st Young rider classification

3rd Giro di Lombardia
4th Overall Tour de Romandie

1st Young rider classification
1st Stage 5

4th Overall Tour de Suisse

1st Stage 5

4th Overall Tirreno–Adriatico
4th Milano–Torino
6th Grand Prix de Wallonie
6th International Road Cycling Challenge
10th UCI World Tour
10th Overall Tour of the Basque Country
2016 (6)
1st Time trial, National Road Championships
1st Overall Critérium International

1st Points classification
1st Stages 2 (ITT) & 3

1st Stage 6 Critérium du Dauphiné
2nd Overall Tour de Romandie

1st Stage 3 (ITT)

2nd Grand Prix d'Ouverture La Marseillaise
3rd Overall Étoile de Bessèges
4th Overall Tour of the Basque Country
4th Overall Volta ao Algarve
5th Overall Tirreno–Adriatico
Tour de France

Held after Stages 9–11
Combativity award Stage 8

2017 (4)
1st Overall Tour de l'Ain

1st Mountains classification

2nd Overall Tour of the Alps

1st Stage 5

2nd Tre Valli Varesine
3rd Overall Vuelta a Andalucía

1st Stage 2

3rd Overall Tirreno–Adriatico
4th Overall Giro d'Italia

1st Stage 20

5th Giro di Lombardia
8th Giro dell'Emilia
8th Milano–Torino
9th Strade Bianche
9th Grand Prix d'Ouverture La Marseillaise
2018 (5)
1st Overall Tour of the Alps
1st Giro di Lombardia
1st Milano–Torino
2nd Tre Valli Varesine
3rd Overall Tour de Pologne
5th Overall Tour du Haut Var
5th Giro dell'Emilia
6th Overall Vuelta a España

1st Stages 15 & 19

9th Road race, UCI Road World Championships
10th Overall Volta a Catalunya
2019 (5)
1st Overall Tour de l'Ain

1st Points classification
1st Mountains classification
1st Stage 3

1st Overall Tour du Haut Var

1st Points classification
1st Stage 3

1st Stage 14 Tour de France
4th Overall Tour de la Provence
5th Overall Critérium du Dauphiné
5th Overall Tirreno–Adriatico
2020
2nd Overall Critérium du Dauphiné
4th Overall Route d'Occitanie
5th Overall Paris–Nice
6th Overall Tour des Alpes-Maritimes et du Var
7th Overall Tour de la Provence
2021
5th Coppa Bernocchi
5th Classic Grand Besançon Doubs
7th Overall Tour de Luxembourg
8th Ardèche Classic
2022 (2)
Tour of the Alps

1st Sprints classification
1st Stage 5

1st Stage 7 Tour de Suisse
8th Overall Tirreno–Adriatico
Combativity award Stage 9 Tour de France
2023
2nd Tour du Doubs
2nd Tour du Jura
5th Overall Giro d'Italia

1st Mountains classification
Combativity award Stages 13, 18 & 20

5th Overall Tour de Romandie
5th Classic Grand Besançon Doubs
6th Overall Étoile de Bessèges
10th Overall Tirreno–Adriatico
Combativity award Stage 20 Tour de France

==== General classification results timeline ====
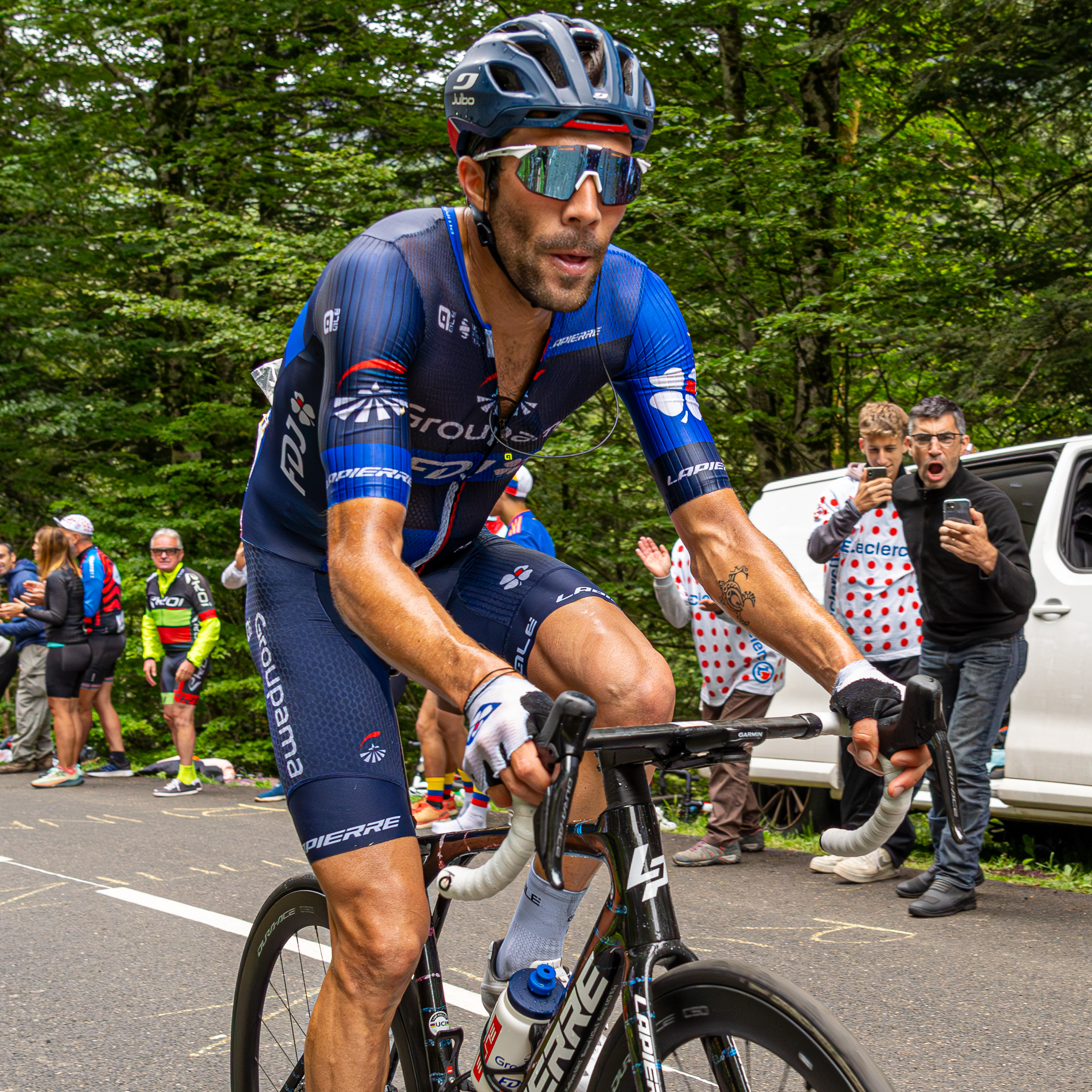
Pinot rode his final Tour de France in 2023, winning the combativity award on the penultimate stage as he finished eleventh overall

Grand Tour general classification results
Grand Tour	2010	2011	2012	2013	2014	2015	2016	2017	2018	2019	2020	2021	2022	2023
Giro d'Italia	—	—	—	—	—	—	—	4	DNF	—	—	—	—	5
Tour de France	—	—	10	DNF	3	16	DNF	DNF	—	DNF	29	—	15	11
Vuelta a España	—	—	—	7	DNF	—	—	—	6	—	DNF	—	17	—
Major stage race general classification results
Race	2010	2011	2012	2013	2014	2015	2016	2017	2018	2019	2020	2021	2022	2023
Paris–Nice	—	—	—	—	—	—	—	—	—	—	5	—	—	—
Tirreno–Adriatico	—	—	50	—	DNF	4	5	3	—	5	—	43	8	10
Volta a Catalunya	49	—	DNF	8	13	—	—	—	10	11	NH	—	—	—
Tour of the Basque Country	—	—	DNF	40	9	10	4	—	—	—	NH	—	—	—
Tour de Romandie	30	—	11	12	10	4	2	—	—	—	NH	—	13	5
Critérium du Dauphiné	20	16	—	—	—	—	16	—	—	5	2	—	—	—
Tour de Suisse	—	—	DNF	4	15	4	—	—	—	—	NH	—	14	—

==== Monuments results timeline ====
Monument	2011	2012	2013	2014	2015	2016	2017	2018	2019	2020	2021	2022	2023
Milan–San Remo	Did not contest during his career												
Tour of Flanders	Did not contest during his career												
Paris–Roubaix	Did not contest during his career												
Liège–Bastogne–Liège	Did not contest during his career												
Giro di Lombardia	47	DNF	12	14	3	—	5	1	—	—	50	—	37

Legend
—	Did not compete
DNF	Did not finish
IP	In progress
NH	Not held

=== Awards ===
- Vélo d'Or français: 2015, 2018
