= 2019 Tirreno–Adriatico =

Cycling race

2019 UCI World Tour, race 7 of 38

Race details
- Dates: 13–19 March 2019
- Stages: 7
- Distance: 1,048.55 km (651.5 mi)
- Winning time: 25h 28' 00"

Results
Jersey awarded to the overall winner	Winner	Primož Roglič (SLO)	(Team Jumbo–Visma)
	Second	Adam Yates (GBR)	(Mitchelton–Scott)
	Third	Jakob Fuglsang (DEN)	(Astana)
Jersey awarded to the mountains classification winner	Mountains	Alexey Lutsenko (KAZ)	(Astana)
Jersey awarded to the youth classification winner	Youth	Sam Oomen (NED)	(Team Sunweb)
Jersey awarded to the sprints classification winner	Sprints	Mirco Maestri (ITA)	(Bardiani–CSF)
	Team	EF Education First	

The 2019 Tirreno–Adriatico was a road cycling stage race, that took place between 13 and 19 March 2019 in Italy. It was the 54th edition of Tirreno–Adriatico and the seventh race of the 2019 UCI World Tour. It was won by Primož Roglič of Team Jumbo–Visma.

== Teams ==
The 18 UCI WorldTeams were automatically invited to the race. In addition five second-tier UCI Continental Circuits received a wildcard invitation to participate in the event.

The teams entering the race were:

UCI WorldTeams

- AG2R La Mondiale
- Astana
- Bahrain–Merida
- Bora–Hansgrohe
- CCC Team
- EF Education First
- Team Dimension Data
- Groupama–FDJ
- Team Katusha–Alpecin
- Team Jumbo–Visma
- Lotto–Soudal
- Movistar Team
- Mitchelton–Scott
- Deceuninck–Quick-Step
- Team Sky
- Team Sunweb
- Trek–Segafredo
- UAE Team Emirates

UCI Professional Continental teams

- Bardiani–CSF
- Cofidis
- Gazprom–RusVelo
- Israel Cycling Academy
- Neri Sottoli–Selle Italia–KTM

== Route ==
Stage schedule
Stage	Date	Route	Distance	Type	Winner
1	13 March	Lido di Camaiore to Lido di Camaiore	21.5 km (13 mi)	Team time trial	Mitchelton–Scott
2	14 March	Camaiore to Pomarance	195 km (121 mi)	Hilly stage	Julian Alaphilippe (FRA)
3	15 March	Pomarance to Foligno	226 km (140 mi)	Flat stage	Elia Viviani (ITA)
4	16 March	Foligno to Fossombrone	221 km (137 mi)	Hilly stage	Alexey Lutsenko (KAZ)
5	17 March	Colli al Metauro to Recanati	180 km (112 mi)	Hilly stage	Jakob Fuglsang (DEN)
6	18 March	Matelica to Jesi	195 km (121 mi)	Flat stage	Julian Alaphilippe (FRA)
7	19 March	San Benedetto del Tronto to San Benedetto del Tronto	10.05 km (6 mi)	Individual time trial	Victor Campenaerts (BEL)

== Stages ==
=== Stage 1 ===
13 March 2019 — Lido di Camaiore to Lido di Camaiore, 21.5 km (13 mi), team time trial (TTT)

Result of Stage 1
Rank	Team	Time
1	Mitchelton–Scott	22' 25"
2	Team Jumbo–Visma	+ 7"
3	Team Sunweb	+ 22"
4	Deceuninck–Quick-Step	+ 37"
5	Team Sky	+ 47"
6	Lotto–Soudal	+ 54"
7	EF Education First	+ 56"
8	Groupama–FDJ	+ 58"
9	Israel Cycling Academy	+ 1' 05"
10	Bahrain–Merida	+ 1' 10"

General classification after Stage 1
Rank	Rider	Team	Time
1	Michael Hepburn (AUS)	Mitchelton–Scott	22' 25"
2	Brent Bookwalter (USA)	Mitchelton–Scott	+ 0"
3	Luke Durbridge (AUS)	Mitchelton–Scott	+ 0"
4	Adam Yates (GBR)	Mitchelton–Scott	+ 0"
5	Alexander Edmondson (AUS)	Mitchelton–Scott	+ 0"
6	Jos van Emden (NED)	Team Jumbo–Visma	+ 7"
7	Primož Roglič (SLO)	Team Jumbo–Visma	+ 7"
8	Koen Bouwman (NED)	Team Jumbo–Visma	+ 7"
9	Tony Martin (GER)	Team Jumbo–Visma	+ 7"
10	Laurens De Plus (BEL)	Team Jumbo–Visma	+ 7"

=== Stage 2 ===
14 March 2019 – Camaiore to Pomarance, 189 km (117 mi)

Result of Stage 2
Rank	Rider	Team	Time
1	Julian Alaphilippe (FRA)	Deceuninck–Quick-Step	4h 48' 09"
2	Greg Van Avermaet (BEL)	CCC Team	s.t.
3	Alberto Bettiol (ITA)	EF Education First	s.t.
4	Tiesj Benoot (BEL)	Lotto–Soudal	s.t.
5	Adam Yates (GBR)	Mitchelton–Scott	s.t.
6	Valerio Conti (ITA)	UAE Team Emirates	s.t.
7	Primož Roglič (SLO)	Team Jumbo–Visma	s.t.
8	Wout Poels (NED)	Team Sky	s.t.
9	Jakob Fuglsang (DEN)	Astana	s.t.
10	Tim Wellens (BEL)	Lotto–Soudal	s.t.

General classification after Stage 2
Rank	Rider	Team	Time
1	Adam Yates (GBR)	Mitchelton–Scott	5h 10' 34"
2	Brent Bookwalter (USA)	Mitchelton–Scott	+ 0"
3	Primož Roglič (SLO)	Team Jumbo–Visma	+ 7"
4	Laurens De Plus (BEL)	Team Jumbo–Visma	+ 7"
5	Søren Kragh Andersen (DEN)	Team Sunweb	+ 22"
6	Tom Dumoulin (NED)	Team Sunweb	+ 22"
7	Sam Oomen (NED)	Team Sunweb	+ 22"
8	Julian Alaphilippe (FRA)	Deceuninck–Quick-Step	+ 27"
9	Kasper Asgreen (DEN)	Deceuninck–Quick-Step	+ 37"
10	Wout Poels (NED)	Team Sky	+ 47"

=== Stage 3 ===
15 March 2019 – Pomarance to Foligno, 189 km (117 mi)

Result of Stage 3
Rank	Rider	Team	Time
1	Elia Viviani (ITA)	Deceuninck–Quick-Step	5h 26' 45"
2	Peter Sagan (SVK)	Bora–Hansgrohe	s.t.
3	Fernando Gaviria (COL)	UAE Team Emirates	s.t.
4	Giacomo Nizzolo (ITA)	Team Dimension Data	s.t.
5	Jens Keukeleire (BEL)	Lotto–Soudal	s.t.
6	Davide Cimolai (ITA)	Israel Cycling Academy	s.t.
7	Clément Venturini (FRA)	AG2R La Mondiale	s.t.
8	Jasper Stuyven (BEL)	Trek–Segafredo	s.t.
9	Davide Ballerini (ITA)	Astana	s.t.
10	Luca Pacioni (ITA)	Neri Sottoli–Selle Italia–KTM	s.t.

General classification after Stage 3
Rank	Rider	Team	Time
1	Adam Yates (GBR)	Mitchelton–Scott	10h 37' 19"
2	Brent Bookwalter (USA)	Mitchelton–Scott	+ 0"
3	Primož Roglič (SLO)	Team Jumbo–Visma	+ 7"
4	Laurens De Plus (BEL)	Team Jumbo–Visma	+ 7"
5	Tom Dumoulin (NED)	Team Sunweb	+ 22"
6	Sam Oomen (NED)	Team Sunweb	+ 22"
7	Søren Kragh Andersen (DEN)	Team Sunweb	+ 22"
8	Julian Alaphilippe (FRA)	Deceuninck–Quick-Step	+ 27"
9	Wout Poels (NED)	Team Sky	+ 47"
10	Jonathan Castroviejo (ESP)	Team Sky	+ 47"

=== Stage 4 ===
16 March 2019 – Foligno to Fossombrone, 223 km (139 mi)

Result of Stage 4
Rank	Rider	Team	Time
1	Alexey Lutsenko (KAZ)	Astana	5h 16' 29"
2	Primož Roglič (SLO)	Team Jumbo–Visma	s.t.
3	Adam Yates (GBR)	Mitchelton–Scott	s.t.
4	Jakob Fuglsang (DEN)	Astana	s.t.
5	Davide Formolo (ITA)	Bora–Hansgrohe	+ 9"
6	Alberto Bettiol (ITA)	EF Education First	+ 23"
7	Simon Clarke (AUS)	EF Education First	+ 23"
8	Tiesj Benoot (BEL)	Lotto–Soudal	+ 23"
9	Julian Alaphilippe (FRA)	Deceuninck–Quick-Step	+ 23"
10	Wout Poels (NED)	Team Sky	+ 23"

General classification after Stage 4
Rank	Rider	Team	Time
1	Adam Yates (GBR)	Mitchelton–Scott	15h 53' 42"
2	Primož Roglič (SLO)	Team Jumbo–Visma	+ 5"
3	Tom Dumoulin (NED)	Team Sunweb	+ 50"
4	Julian Alaphilippe (FRA)	Deceuninck–Quick-Step	+ 56"
5	Sam Oomen (NED)	Team Sunweb	+ 56"
6	Alexey Lutsenko (KAZ)	Astana	+ 1' 06"
7	Wout Poels (NED)	Team Sky	+ 1' 16"
8	Jakob Fuglsang (DEN)	Astana	+ 1' 19"
9	Alberto Bettiol (ITA)	EF Education First	+ 1' 21"
10	Simon Clarke (AUS)	EF Education First	+ 1' 25"

=== Stage 5 ===
17 March 2019 — Colli al Metauro to Recanati, 180 km (112 mi)

Result of Stage 5
Rank	Rider	Team	Time
1	Jakob Fuglsang (DEN)	Astana	4h 39' 48"
2	Adam Yates (GBR)	Mitchelton–Scott	+ 40"
3	Primož Roglič (SLO)	Team Jumbo–Visma	+ 56"
4	Tom Dumoulin (NED)	Team Sunweb	+ 1' 39"
5	Thibaut Pinot (FRA)	Groupama–FDJ	+ 1' 53"
6	Wout Poels (NED)	Team Sky	+ 1' 57"
7	Mads Pedersen (DEN)	Trek–Segafredo	+ 2' 09"
8	Alexis Vuillermoz (FRA)	AG2R La Mondiale	+ 2' 12"
9	Tiesj Benoot (BEL)	Lotto–Soudal	+ 2' 12"
10	Simon Clarke (AUS)	EF Education First	+ 2' 12"

General classification after Stage 5
Rank	Rider	Team	Time
1	Adam Yates (GBR)	Mitchelton–Scott	20h 33' 48"
2	Primož Roglič (SLO)	Team Jumbo–Visma	+ 25"
3	Jakob Fuglsang (DEN)	Astana	+ 35"
4	Tom Dumoulin (NED)	Team Sunweb	+ 1' 55"
5	Julian Alaphilippe (FRA)	Deceuninck–Quick-Step	+ 2' 34"
6	Wout Poels (NED)	Team Sky	+ 2' 39"
7	Thibaut Pinot (FRA)	Groupama–FDJ	+ 2' 46"
8	Sam Oomen (NED)	Team Sunweb	+ 2' 58"
9	Simon Clarke (AUS)	EF Education First	+ 3' 03"
10	Rui Costa (POR)	UAE Team Emirates	+ 3' 26"

=== Stage 6 ===
18 March 2019 — Matelica to Jesi, 195 km (121 mi)

Result of Stage 6
Rank	Rider	Team	Time
1	Julian Alaphilippe (FRA)	Deceuninck–Quick-Step	4h 42' 11"
2	Davide Cimolai (ITA)	Israel Cycling Academy	s.t
3	Elia Viviani (ITA)	Deceuninck–Quick-Step	s.t
4	Clément Venturini (FRA)	AG2R La Mondiale	s.t
5	Peter Sagan (SVK)	Bora–Hansgrohe	s.t
6	Maximiliano Richeze (ARG)	Deceuninck–Quick-Step	s.t
7	Jens Keukeleire (BEL)	Lotto–Soudal	s.t
8	Greg Van Avermaet (BEL)	CCC Team	s.t
9	Reinardt Janse Van Rensburg (RSA)	Team Dimension Data	s.t
10	Simone Consonni (ITA)	UAE Team Emirates	s.t

General classification after Stage 6
Rank	Rider	Team	Time
1	Adam Yates (GBR)	Mitchelton–Scott	25h 15' 59"
2	Primož Roglič (SLO)	Team Jumbo–Visma	+ 25"
3	Jakob Fuglsang (DEN)	Astana	+ 35"
4	Tom Dumoulin (NED)	Team Sunweb	+ 1' 55"
5	Julian Alaphilippe (FRA)	Deceuninck–Quick-Step	+ 2' 24"
6	Wout Poels (NED)	Team Sky	+ 2' 39"
7	Thibaut Pinot (FRA)	Groupama–FDJ	+ 2' 46"
8	Sam Oomen (NED)	Team Sunweb	+ 2' 58"
9	Simon Clarke (AUS)	EF Education First	+ 3' 03"
10	Rui Costa (POR)	UAE Team Emirates	+ 3' 26"

=== Stage 7 ===
19 March 2019 — San Benedetto del Tronto to San Benedetto del Tronto, 10.05 km (6 mi), individual time trial (ITT)

Result of Stage 7
Rank	Rider	Team	Time
1	Victor Campenaerts (BEL)	Lotto–Soudal	11' 23"
2	Alberto Bettiol (ITA)	EF Education First	+ 3"
3	Jos van Emden (NED)	Team Jumbo–Visma	+ 4"
4	Sebastian Langeveld (NED)	EF Education First	+ 6"
5	Yves Lampaert (BEL)	Deceuninck–Quick-Step	+ 7"
6	Mads Pedersen (DEN)	Trek–Segafredo	+ 8"
7	Tom Dumoulin (NED)	Team Sunweb	+ 8"
8	Rohan Dennis (AUS)	Bahrain–Merida	+ 9"
9	Michael Hepburn (AUS)	Mitchelton–Scott	+ 11"
10	Filippo Ganna (ITA)	Team Sky	+ 12"

General classification after Stage 7
Rank	Rider	Team	Time
1	Primož Roglič (SLO)	Team Jumbo–Visma	25h 28' 00"
2	Adam Yates (GBR)	Mitchelton–Scott	+ 1"
3	Jakob Fuglsang (DEN)	Astana	+ 30"
4	Tom Dumoulin (NED)	Team Sunweb	+ 1' 25"
5	Thibaut Pinot (FRA)	Groupama–FDJ	+ 2' 32"
6	Julian Alaphilippe (FRA)	Deceuninck–Quick-Step	+ 2' 34"
7	Wout Poels (NED)	Team Sky	+ 2' 42"
8	Simon Clarke (AUS)	EF Education First	+ 3' 01"
9	Sam Oomen (NED)	Team Sunweb	+ 3' 12"
10	Rui Costa (POR)	UAE Team Emirates	+ 3' 18"

== Classification leadership table ==
In the 2019 Tirreno–Adriatico, four jerseys were awarded. The general classification was calculated by adding each cyclist's finishing times on each stage. Time bonuses were awarded to the first three finishers on all stages except for the time trials: the stage winner won a ten-second bonus, with six and four seconds for the second and third riders respectively. Bonus seconds were also awarded to the first three riders at intermediate sprints; three seconds for the winner of the sprint, two seconds for the rider in second and one second for the rider in third. The leader of the general classification received a blue jersey. This classification was considered the most important of the 2019 Tirreno–Adriatico, and the winner of the classification was considered the winner of the race.

Points for stage victory
Position	1	2	3	4	5	6	7	8	9	10
Points awarded	12	10	8	7	6	5	4	3	2	1

The second classification was the points classification. Riders were awarded points for finishing in the top ten in a stage. Unlike in the points classification in the Tour de France, the winners of all stages – with the exception of the team time trial, which awarded no points towards the classification – were awarded the same number of points. Points were also won in intermediate sprints; five points for crossing the sprint line first, three points for second place, two for third and one for fourth. The leader of the points classification was awarded an orange jersey.

Points for the mountains classification
Position	1	2	3	4	5	6	7
Points for Superior	15	10	7	5	3	2	1
Points for single category	5	3	2	1	0		

There was also a mountains classification, for which points were awarded for reaching the top of a climb before other riders. Each of the sixteen climbs was categorised as either Superior-, or single-category, with more points available for the more difficult, Superior-category climb to Sassotetto. For this climb, the top seven riders earned points; on the other climbs, only the top four riders earned points. The leadership of the mountains classification was marked by a green jersey.

The fourth jersey represented the young rider classification, marked by a white jersey. Only riders born after 1 January 1994 were eligible; the young rider best placed in the general classification was the leader of the young rider classification. There was also a classification for teams, in which the times of the best three cyclists in a team on each stage were added together; the leading team at the end of the race was the team with the lowest cumulative time.

Stage	Winner	General classification	Points classification	Mountains classification	Young rider classification	Teams classification
1	Mitchelton–Scott	Michael Hepburn	Not awarded	Not awarded	Laurens De Plus	Mitchelton–Scott
2	Julian Alaphilippe	Adam Yates	Julian Alaphilippe	Julian Alaphilippe	Laurens De Plus	Team Jumbo–Visma
3	Elia Viviani	Adam Yates	Mirco Maestri	Natnael Berhane	Laurens De Plus	Team Jumbo–Visma
4	Alexey Lutsenko	Adam Yates	Mirco Maestri	Alexey Lutsenko	Sam Oomen	EF Education First
5	Jakob Fuglsang	Adam Yates	Adam Yates	Alexey Lutsenko	Sam Oomen	EF Education First
6	Julian Alaphilippe	Adam Yates	Mirco Maestri	Alexey Lutsenko	Sam Oomen	EF Education First
7	Victor Campenaerts	Primož Roglič	Mirco Maestri	Alexey Lutsenko	Sam Oomen	EF Education First
Final		Primož Roglič	Mirco Maestri	Alexey Lutsenko	Sam Oomen	EF Education First

== Final classification standings ==
Legend
Denotes the winner of the general classification	Denotes the winner of the mountains classification
Denotes the winner of the points classification	Denotes the winner of the young rider classification

=== General classification ===
Final general classification
Rank	Rider	Team	Time
1	Primož Roglič (SLO)	Team Jumbo–Visma	25h 28' 00"
2	Adam Yates (GBR)	Mitchelton–Scott	+ 1"
3	Jakob Fuglsang (DEN)	Astana	+ 30"
4	Tom Dumoulin (NED)	Team Sunweb	+ 1' 25"
5	Thibaut Pinot (FRA)	Groupama–FDJ	+ 2' 32"
6	Julian Alaphilippe (FRA)	Deceuninck–Quick-Step	+ 2' 34"
7	Wout Poels (NED)	Team Sky	+ 2' 42"
8	Simon Clarke (AUS)	EF Education First	+ 3' 01"
9	Sam Oomen (NED)	Team Sunweb	+ 3' 12"
10	Rui Costa (POR)	UAE Team Emirates	+ 3' 18"

=== Points classification ===
Final points classification
Rank	Rider	Team	Points
1	Mirco Maestri (ITA)	Bardiani–CSF	31
2	Adam Yates (GBR)	Mitchelton–Scott	27
3	Julian Alaphilippe (FRA)	Deceuninck–Quick-Step	26
4	Alberto Bettiol (ITA)	EF Education First	23
5	Jakob Fuglsang (DEN)	Astana	22
6	Primož Roglič (SLO)	Team Jumbo–Visma	22
7	Elia Viviani (ITA)	Deceuninck–Quick-Step	20
8	Alexey Lutsenko (KAZ)	Astana	17
9	Peter Sagan (SVK)	Bora–Hansgrohe	16
10	Davide Cimolai (ITA)	Israel Cycling Academy	15

=== Mountains classification ===
Final mountains classification
Rank	Rider	Team	Points
1	Alexey Lutsenko (KAZ)	Astana	35
2	Jakob Fuglsang (DEN)	Astana	34
3	Adam Yates (GBR)	Mitchelton–Scott	25
4	Julian Alaphilippe (FRA)	Deceuninck–Quick-Step	23
5	Davide Gabburo (ITA)	Neri Sottoli–Selle Italia–KTM	20
6	Natnael Berhane (ERI)	Cofidis	20
7	Primož Roglič (SLO)	Team Jumbo–Visma	18
8	Mads Pedersen (DEN)	Trek–Segafredo	14
9	Sebastian Schönberger (AUT)	Neri Sottoli–Selle Italia–KTM	12
10	Giovanni Visconti (ITA)	Neri Sottoli–Selle Italia–KTM	10

=== Young rider classification ===
Final young rider classification
Rank	Rider	Team	Time
1	Sam Oomen (NED)	Team Sunweb	25h 31' 12"
2	Tiesj Benoot (BEL)	Lotto–Soudal	+ 25"
3	Matej Mohorič (SLO)	Bahrain–Merida	+ 1' 50"
4	Ruben Guerreiro (POR)	Team Katusha–Alpecin	+ 5' 03"
5	Søren Kragh Andersen (DEN)	Team Sunweb	+ 15' 44"
6	Simone Velasco (ITA)	Neri Sottoli–Selle Italia–KTM	+ 15' 51"
7	Mads Pedersen (DEN)	Trek–Segafredo	+ 24' 01"
8	Davide Ballerini (ITA)	Astana	+ 25' 52"
9	Nicola Conci (ITA)	Trek–Segafredo	+ 27' 31"
10	Kasper Asgreen (DEN)	Deceuninck–Quick-Step	+ 27' 31"

=== Teams classification ===
Final teams classification
Rank	Team	Time
1	EF Education First	75h 51' 29"
2	Trek–Segafredo	+ 2' 30"
3	Team Sunweb	+ 6' 09"
4	Lotto–Soudal	+ 9' 14"
5	Astana	+ 13' 27"
6	Movistar Team	+ 18' 57"
7	Neri Sottoli–Selle Italia–KTM	+ 19' 22"
8	Bahrain–Merida	+ 23' 10"
9	CCC Team	+ 23' 48"
10	Team Jumbo–Visma	+ 25' 18"
