= Sam Oomen =

Dutch cyclist (born 1995)

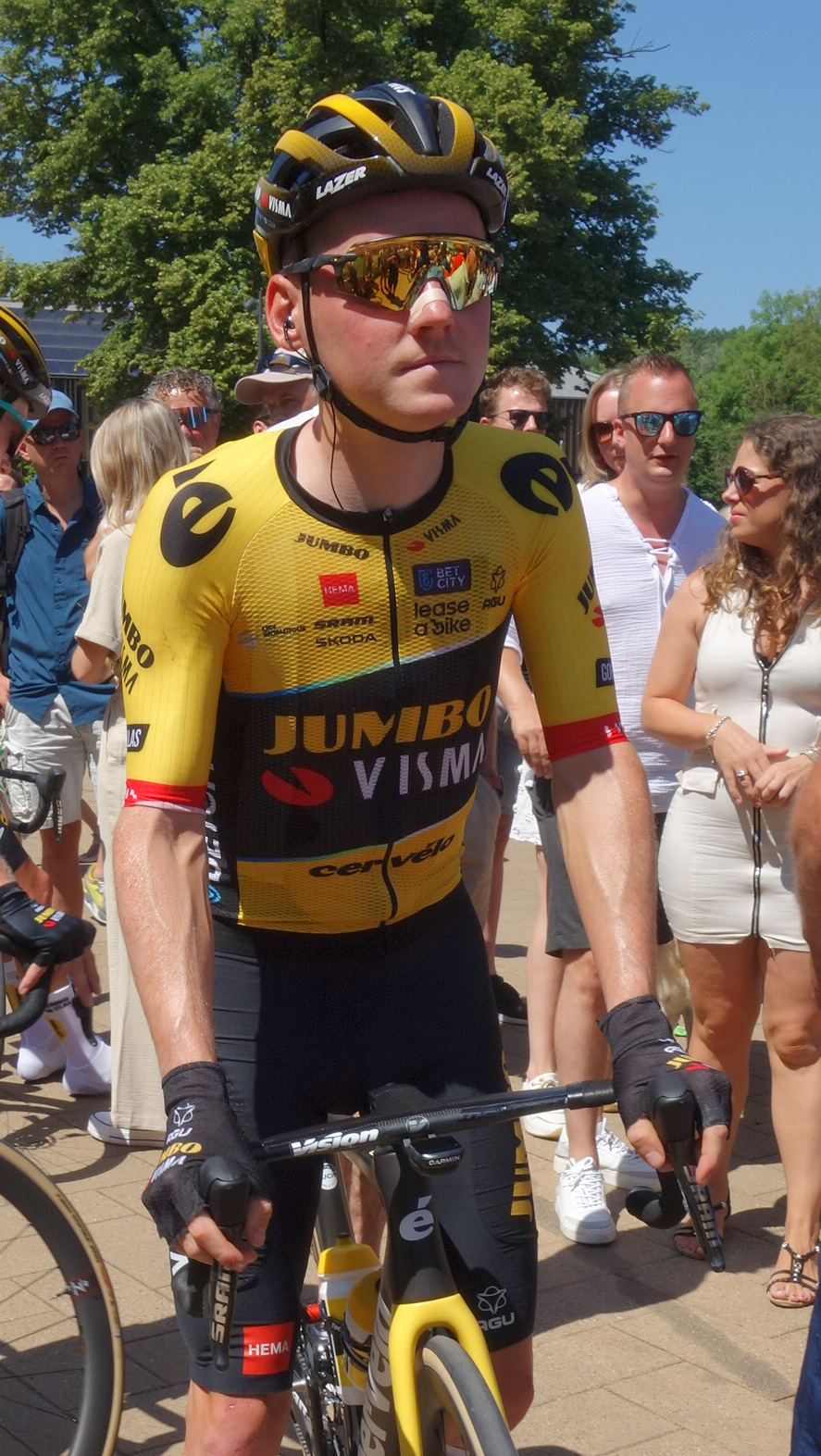
- Oomen in 2023

Personal information
- Born: 15 August 1995 (age 31) Tilburg, Netherlands
- Height: 1.77 m (5 ft 10 in)
- Weight: 65 kg (143 lb)

Cycling career
- Sport: Cycling
- Current team: Lidl–Trek
- Discipline: Road
- Role: Rider
- Rider type: Climber

Professional teams
- 2014–2015: Rabobank Development Team
- 2016–2020: Team Giant–Alpecin
- 2021–2023: Team Jumbo–Visma
- 2024–: Lidl–Trek

Major wins
- Grand Tours Vuelta a España 1 TTT stage (2022)
Medal record
Representing Team Sunweb
World Championships
Gold medal – first place	2017 Bergen	Team time trial
Silver medal – second place	2018 Innsbruck	Team time trial

Sam Oomen (born 15 August 1995) is a Dutch racing cyclist, who currently rides for UCI WorldTeam Lidl–Trek.

== Career ==
He rode at the 2014 UCI Road World Championships in the U23 category. In October 2015 it was announced that he would join Team Giant–Alpecin from 2016 on an initial three-year contract. He was named in the startlist for the 2017 Vuelta a España, where he was forced to leave with illness.

=== 2018 ===
He started the season by racing in the Tour Down Under, where he finished in 15th overall and was 24 seconds behind the winning time. Oomen led Team Sunweb at the Volta ao Algarve. In May 2018, he was named in the startlist for the Giro d'Italia, which he finished in ninth place, while riding in support for Tom Dumoulin.

== Major results ==
2012
1st Overall Grand Prix Rüebliland

1st Young rider classification
1st Stage 3 (ITT)

2013
1st Time trial, National Junior Road Championships
2nd Overall Junior Tour of Wales
5th Overall Trophée Centre Morbihan
10th Overall Grand Prix Rüebliland
2014
1st Mountains classification, Tour de Bretagne
3rd Paris–Tours Espoirs
8th Overall Tour des Fjords
2015
1st Overall Rhône-Alpes Isère Tour

1st Points classification
1st Young rider classification
1st Stage 1

1st Paris–Tours Espoirs
2nd Overall Tour des Pays de Savoie Mont-Blanc

1st Mountains classification
1st Young rider classification
1st Stages 2 & 4 (ITT)

2nd Overall Tour Alsace

1st Young rider classification

3rd Flèche Ardennaise
4th Overall Istrian Spring Trophy
4th Overall Tour de l'Avenir
8th Overall Tour de l'Ain
8th Liège–Bastogne–Liège Espoirs
2016
1st Overall Tour de l'Ain

1st Young rider classification
1st Stage 3

3rd Overall Critérium International
10th Overall Tour du Poitou-Charentes
2017
1st Team time trial, UCI Road World Championships
6th Tre Valli Varesine
7th Overall Tour de Pologne
9th Overall Tour of California
2018
1st Young rider classification, Volta ao Algarve
2nd Team time trial, UCI Road World Championships
7th Overall Tour de Suisse
9th Overall Giro d'Italia
9th Overall Tour de Pologne
2019
5th Overall Volta ao Algarve
9th Overall Tirreno–Adriatico

1st Young rider classification

2021
8th Overall Tour de Suisse
2022
1st Stage 1 (TTT) Vuelta a España
5th Road race, National Road Championships
10th Overall Volta a Catalunya
2026
8th Overall Tour de Luxembourg

=== General classification results timeline ===
Grand Tour general classification results
Grand Tour	2016	2017	2018	2019	2020	2021	2022	2023
Giro d'Italia	—	—	9	DNF	21	—	20	36
Tour de France	—	—	—	—	—	—	—	—
Vuelta a España	—	DNF	—	—	—	18	30	
Major stage race general classification results
Race	2016	2017	2018	2019	2020	2021	2022	2023
Paris–Nice	—	14	13	—	—	41	—	—
Tirreno–Adriatico	—	—	—	9	11	—	—	—
Volta a Catalunya	—	—	—	—	NH	—	10	—
Tour of the Basque Country	36	19	—	DNF	NH	25	—	29
Tour de Romandie	—	—	—	—	NH	—	—	—
Critérium du Dauphiné	—	14	—	—	—	—	—	—
Tour de Suisse	38	—	7	—	NH	8	DNF	23

Legend
—	Did not compete
DNF	Did not finish
IP	In progress
NH	Not held
