= Daan Myngheer =

Belgian cyclist (1993–2016)

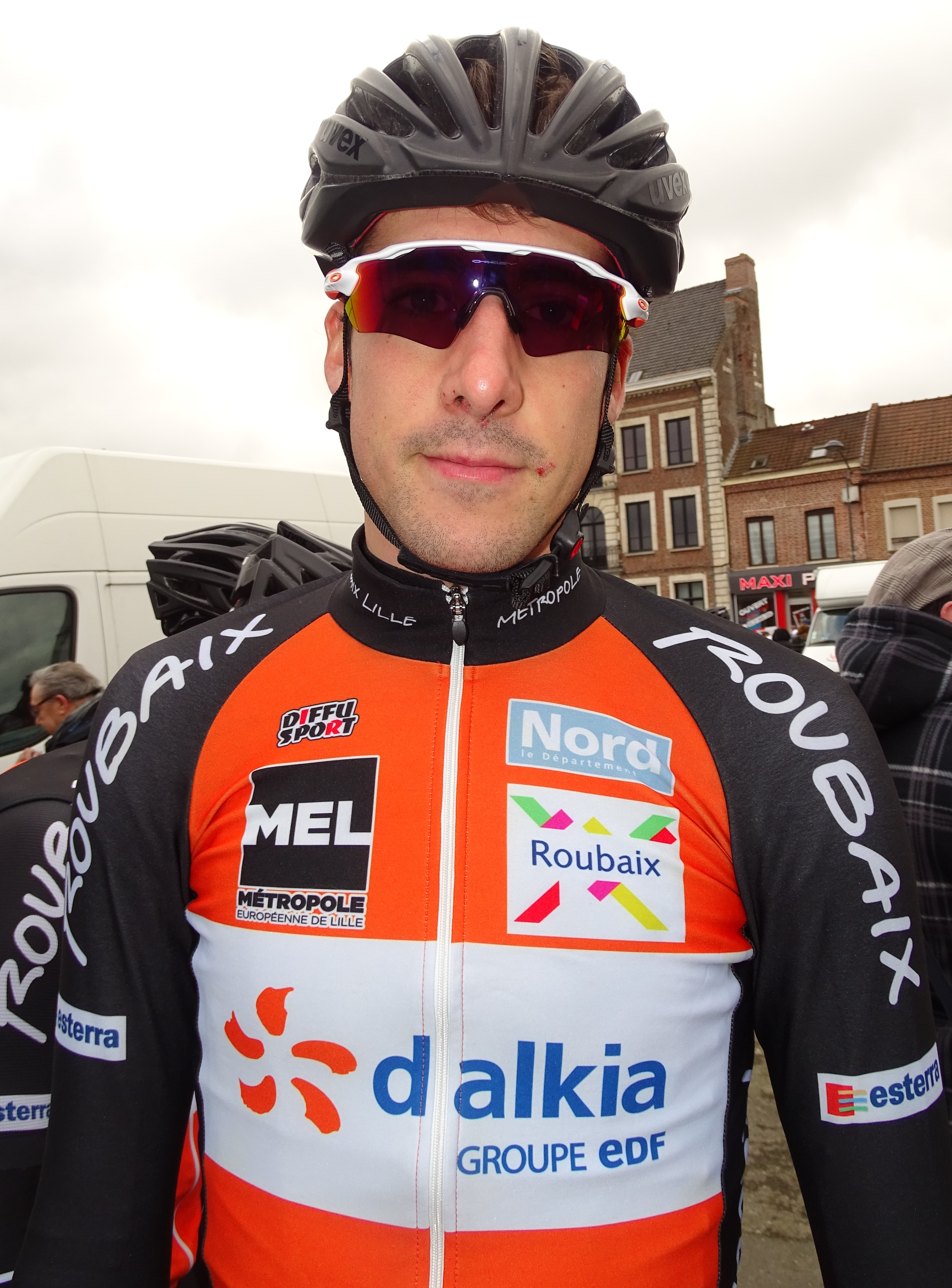
- Myngheer at the Grand Prix de la Ville de Lillers in Lillers, Pas-de-Calais, Nord-Pas-de-Calais, France in March 2016, the month of his death

Personal information
- Born: 13 April 1993 Roeselare, Belgium
- Died: 28 March 2016 (aged 22) Ajaccio, France

Cycling career
- Sport: Cycling
- Discipline: Road
- Role: Rider

Professional teams
- 2015: Verandas Willems
- 2016: Roubaix–Métropole Européenne de Lille

Daan Myngheer (13 April 1993 – 28 March 2016) was a Belgian cyclist who rode for the Roubaix Metropole Europeenne de Lille team.

In March 2016, he suffered a heart attack during the first stage of the 2016 Critérium International race in Corsica, France and died in hospital two days later.

== Major results ==
2011
1st Road race, National Junior Road Championships
1st Omloop Mandel-Leie-Schelde Juniors
2013
1st Road race, West Flanders Under-23 Road Championships
1st Overall Ronde van Oost-Vlaanderen

1st Stage 2

1st Brussels–Zepperen
10th Rund um den Finanzplatz Eschborn-Frankfurt U23
2014
1st Stage 3 (TTT) Essor Breton
5th Kattekoers
5th Rund um den Finanzplatz Eschborn-Frankfurt U23
2015
4th Grand Prix Criquielion
7th Omloop Het Nieuwsblad U23
9th Ster van Zwolle

== See also ==
- List of professional cyclists who died during a race
