= 2016 Critérium International =

2016 UCI Europe Tour

Race details
- Dates: 26–27 March 2016
- Stages: 3
- Distance: 269 km (167.1 mi)
- Winning time: 6h 46' 34"

Results
Jersey awarded to the overall winner	Winner	Thibaut Pinot (FRA)	(FDJ)
	Second	Pierre Latour (FRA)	(AG2R La Mondiale)
	Third	Sam Oomen (NED)	(Team Giant–Alpecin)
Jersey awarded to the points classification winner	Points	Thibaut Pinot (FRA)	(FDJ)
Jersey awarded to the mountains classification winner	Mountains	Rémy Di Gregorio (FRA)	(Delko–Marseille Provence KTM)
Jersey awarded to the youth classification winner	Youth	Pierre Latour (FRA)	(AG2R La Mondiale)
Jersey awarded to the team classification winner	Team	FDJ	

The 2016 Critérium International was the 85th edition of the Critérium International cycling stage race. It took place on the island of Corsica, around the city of Porto Vecchio. As the previous three editions, the race consisted of three stages, two on the first race day (including a short individual time trial) and one on the second day. Thibaut Pinot of FDJ won the race and two stages, including his first ever win in an individual time trial. The race was overshadowed by the death of Belgian cyclist Daan Myngheer (Roubaix–Métropole Européenne de Lille), who suffered a heart attack during the opening stage of the race and was taken to hospital, where he died.

== Schedule ==
Stage	Date	Course	Distance	Type	Winner
1	26 March	Porto-Vecchio – Porto-Vecchio	90.5 km (56 mi)	Hilly stage	Sam Bennett (IRL)
2	26 March	Porto-Vecchio – Porto-Vecchio	7 km (4 mi)	Individual time trial	Thibaut Pinot (FRA)
3	27 March	Porto-Vecchio – Col de l'Ospedale	171.5 km (107 mi)	Mountain stage	Thibaut Pinot (FRA)
Total		269 km (167.1 mi)			

== Teams ==
A total of 16 teams were selected to take part in the race:

World Teams

- AG2R La Mondiale
- FDJ
- Team Giant–Alpecin
- IAM Cycling
- Cannondale

Professional Continental teams

- Bora–Argon 18
- Cofidis
- Delko–Marseille Provence KTM
- Direct Énergie
- Fortuneo–Vital Concept
- ONE Pro Cycling
- Team Roth
- Stölting Service Group

Continental teams

- Armée de Terre
- HP BTP–Auber93
- Roubaix–Métropole Européenne de Lille

== Stages ==
=== Stage 1 ===
26 March (Morning) Porto-Vecchio – Porto-Vecchio, 90.5 km (56.2 mi)

Stage 1 result (1-10)
Rank	Rider	Team	Time
1	Sam Bennett (IRL)	Bora–Argon 18	2hr 03' 15"
2	Rudy Barbier (FRA)	Roubaix–Métropole Européenne de Lille	s.t.
3	Romain Feillu (FRA)	HP BTP–Auber93	s.t.
4	Stéphane Poulhies (FRA)	Armée de Terre	s.t.
5	Samuel Dumoulin (FRA)	AG2R La Mondiale	s.t.
6	Jimmy Raibaud (FRA)	Armée de Terre	s.t.
7	Ramūnas Navardauskas (LTU)	Cannondale	s.t.
8	Fabian Wegmann (GER)	Stölting Service Group	s.t.
9	Benjamin Giraud (FRA)	Delko–Marseille Provence KTM	s.t.
10	Armindo Fonseca (FRA)	Fortuneo–Vital Concept	s.t.
Source: ProCyclingStats

General classification after stage 1 (1-10)
Rank	Rider	Team	Time
1	Sam Bennett (IRL)	Bora–Argon 18	2hr 03' 09"
2	Rudy Barbier (FRA)	Roubaix–Métropole Européenne de Lille	+2"
3	Lilian Calmejane (FRA)	Direct Énergie	+3"
4	Romain Feillu (FRA)	HP BTP–Auber93	+4"
5	Pierre Latour (FRA)	AG2R La Mondiale	+5"
6	Stéphane Poulhies (FRA)	Armée de Terre	+6"
7	Samuel Dumoulin (FRA)	AG2R La Mondiale	+6"
8	Jimmy Raibaud (FRA)	Armée de Terre	+6"
9	Ramūnas Navardauskas (LTU)	Cannondale	+6"
10	Fabian Wegmann (GER)	Stölting Service Group	+6"
Source: ProCyclingStats

=== Stage 2 ===
26 March (Afternoon) Porto-Vecchio – Porto-Vecchio, 7 km (4.3 mi)

Stage 2 result (1-10)
Rank	Rider	Team	Time
1	Thibaut Pinot (FRA)	FDJ	9' 11"
2	Jérôme Coppel (FRA)	IAM Cycling	+2"
3	Alexandre Geniez (FRA)	FDJ	+3"
4	Moreno Moser (ITA)	Cannondale	+4"
5	Jean-Christophe Péraud (FRA)	AG2R La Mondiale	+5"
6	Ramūnas Navardauskas (LTU)	Cannondale	+10"
7	Sam Oomen (NED)	Team Giant–Alpecin	s.t.
8	Matthias Brändle (AUT)	IAM Cycling	s.t.
9	Jérémy Roy (FRA)	FDJ	+12"
10	Lawson Craddock (USA)	Cannondale	+17"
Source: ProCyclingStats

General classification after stage 2 (1-10)
Rank	Rider	Team	Time
1	Thibaut Pinot (FRA)	FDJ	2hr 12' 26"
2	Jérôme Coppel (FRA)	IAM Cycling	+2"
3	Alexandre Geniez (FRA)	FDJ	+3"
4	Moreno Moser (ITA)	Cannondale	+4"
5	Jean-Christophe Péraud (FRA)	AG2R La Mondiale	+5"
6	Ramūnas Navardauskas (LTU)	Cannondale	+10"
7	Sam Oomen (NED)	Team Giant–Alpecin	s.t.
8	Matthias Brändle (AUT)	IAM Cycling	s.t.
9	Sam Bennett (IRL)	Bora–Argon 18	+16"
10	Lawson Craddock (USA)	Cannondale	+17"
Source: ProCyclingStats

=== Stage 3 ===
27 March Porto-Vecchio – Col de l'Ospedale, 171.5 km (106.6 mi)

Stage 3 result (1-10)
Rank	Rider	Team	Time
1	Thibaut Pinot (FRA)	FDJ	9' 11"
2	Pierre Latour (FRA)	AG2R La Mondiale	+7"
3	Arnold Jeannesson (FRA)	Cofidis	+12"
4	Alexis Vuillermoz (FRA)	AG2R La Mondiale	+23"
5	Sam Oomen (NED)	Team Giant–Alpecin	+26"
6	Lawson Craddock (USA)	Cannondale	+39"
7	Dominik Nerz (GER)	Bora–Argon 18	+47"
8	Romain Sicard (FRA)	Direct Énergie	+1' 22"
9	Davide Villella (ITA)	Cannondale	+1' 44"
10	Alexandre Geniez (FRA)	FDJ	+1' 52"
Source: ProCyclingStats

General classification after stage 3 (1-10)
Rank	Rider	Team	Time
1	Thibaut Pinot (FRA)	FDJ	6hr 46' 34"
2	Pierre Latour (FRA)	AG2R La Mondiale	+37"
3	Sam Oomen (NED)	Team Giant–Alpecin	+46"
4	Arnold Jeannesson (FRA)	Cofidis	+48"
5	Alexis Vuillermoz (FRA)	AG2R La Mondiale	+1' 02"
6	Lawson Craddock (USA)	Cannondale	+1' 06"
7	Dominik Nerz (GER)	Bora–Argon 18	+1' 47"
8	Romain Sicard (FRA)	Direct Énergie	+1' 54"
9	Alexandre Geniez (FRA)	FDJ	+2' 05"
10	Davide Villella (ITA)	Cannondale	+2' 13"
Source: ProCyclingStats

== Classification leadership table ==
Stage	Winner	General classification	Points classification	Mountains classification	Young rider classification	Team Classification
1	Sam Bennett	Sam Bennett	Sam Bennett	Jérémy Leveau	Rudy Barbier	Stölting Service Group
2	Thibaut Pinot	Thibaut Pinot	Thibaut Pinot	Jérémy Leveau	Sam Oomen	FDJ
3	Thibaut Pinot	Thibaut Pinot	Thibaut Pinot	Rémy Di Gregorio	Pierre Latour	FDJ
Final		Thibaut Pinot	Thibaut Pinot	Rémy Di Gregorio	Pierre Latour	FDJ

- In stage two, Romain Feillu, who was third in the points classification, wore the green jersey, because Sam Bennett, the leader of the classification wore the yellow jersey as leader of the general classification and Rudy Barbier, who was second in the points classification, wore the white jersey as leader of the young riders' classification.
- In stage three, Sam Bennett, who was second in the points classification, wore the green jersey, because Thibaut Pinot, the leader of the classification wore the yellow jersey as leader of the general classification.
