= 2022 UAE Team Emirates season =

UAE Team Emirates
- 2022 season
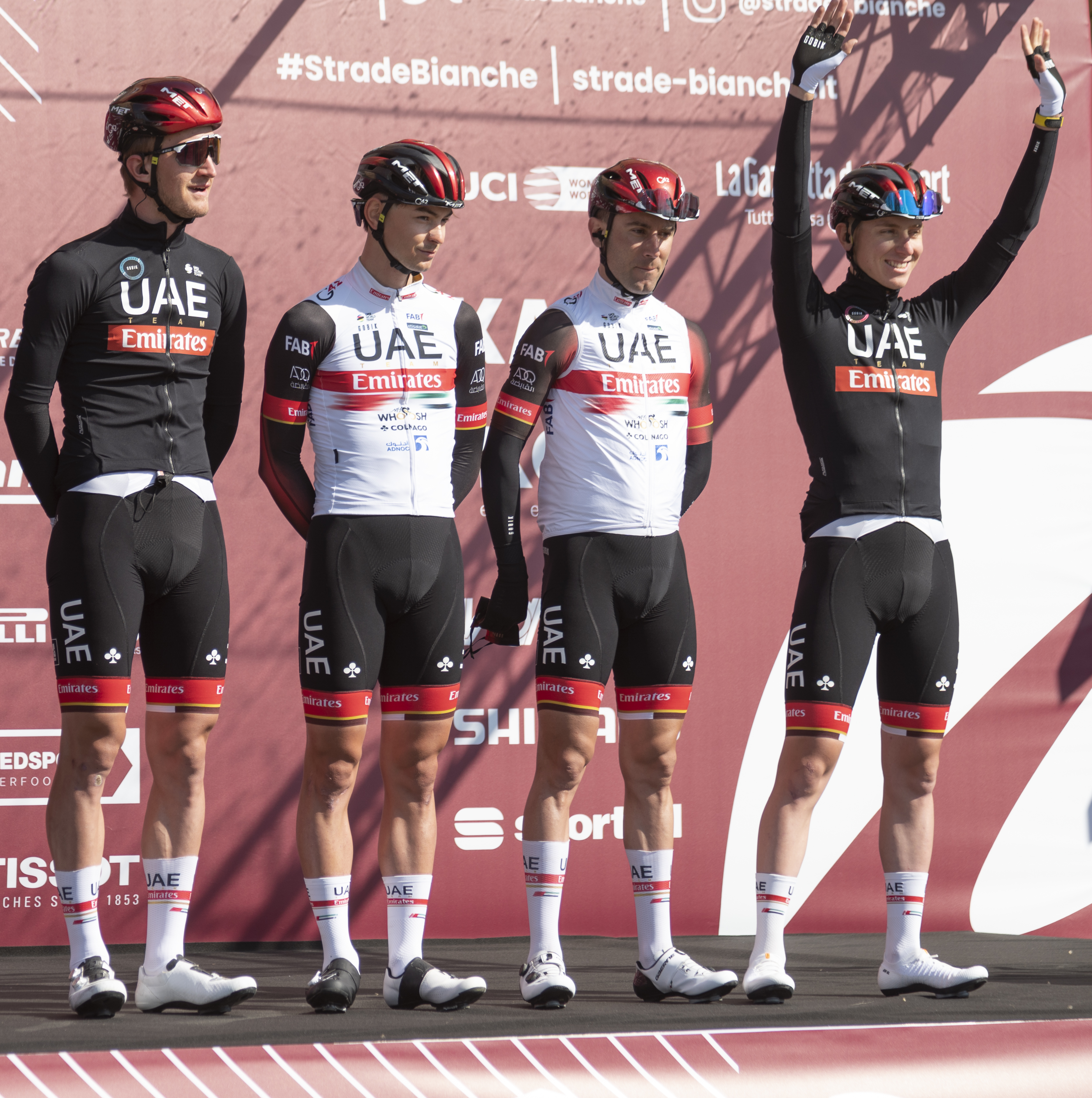
- Team presentation at Strade Bianche
- UCI code: UAD
- Status: UCI WorldTeam
- Manager: José Antonio Fernández (ESP)
- Main sponsor(s): Emirates
- Based: United Arab Emirates
- Bicycles: Colnago
- Groupset: Campagnolo

Season victories
- One-day races: 9
- Stage race overall: 3
- Stage race stages: 19
- National Championships: 2
- Jersey

The 2022 season for UAE Team Emirates is the 24th season in the team's existence and the sixth under the current name. The team has been a UCI WorldTeam since 2005, when the tier was first established. They use Colnago bicycles, Campagnolo drivetrain, Campagnolo wheels and GOBIK clothing.

== Team roster ==
As of 18 January 2022.

Rider	Date of birth
Pascal Ackermann (GER)	17 January 1994 (aged 27)
João Almeida (POR)	5 August 1998 (aged 23)
Andrés Ardila (COL)	2 June 1999 (aged 22)
Juan Ayuso (ESP)	16 September 2002 (aged 19)
George Bennett (NZL)	7 April 1990 (aged 31)
Mikkel Bjerg (DEN)	3 November 1998 (aged 23)
Alexys Brunel (FRA)	10 October 1998 (aged 23)
Alessandro Covi (ITA)	28 September 1998 (aged 23)
Rui Costa (POR)	5 October 1986 (aged 35)
Finn Fisher-Black (NZL)	21 December 2001 (aged 20)
Davide Formolo (ITA)	25 September 1992 (aged 29)
Fernando Gaviria (COL)	19 August 1994 (aged 27)
Ryan Gibbons (RSA)	13 August 1994 (aged 27)
Felix Groß (GER)	4 September 1998 (aged 23)
Marc Hirschi (SUI)	24 August 1998 (aged 23)
Álvaro Hodeg (COL)	16 September 1996 (aged 25)

Rider	Date of birth
Vegard Stake Laengen (NOR)	7 February 1989 (aged 32)
Rafał Majka (POL)	12 September 1989 (aged 32)
Brandon McNulty (USA)	2 April 1998 (aged 23)
Yousif Mirza (UAE)	8 October 1988 (aged 33)
Juan Sebastián Molano (COL)	4 November 1994 (aged 27)
Ivo Oliveira (POR)	5 September 1996 (aged 25)
Rui Oliveira (POR)	5 September 1996 (aged 25)
Tadej Pogačar (SLO)	21 September 1998 (aged 23)
Jan Polanc (SLO)	6 May 1992 (aged 29)
Maximiliano Richeze (Note: Richeze considered retirement when his contract was not renewed at the end of the 2021 season. However, with Álvaro Hodeg being out several months due to injuries, UAE Team Emirates re-signed Richeze on a temporary contract until the end of the Giro d'Italia in May.) (ARG)	7 March 1983 (aged 38)
Marc Soler (ESP)	22 November 1993 (aged 28)
Joel Suter (SUI)	25 October 1998 (aged 23)
Matteo Trentin (ITA)	2 August 1989 (aged 32)
Oliviero Troia (ITA)	1 September 1994 (aged 27)
Diego Ulissi (ITA)	15 July 1989 (aged 32)

Riders who joined the team for the 2022 season

Rider	2021 team
Pascal Ackermann	Bora–Hansgrohe
João Almeida	Deceuninck–Quick-Step
George Bennett	Team Jumbo–Visma
Alexys Brunel	Groupama–FDJ
Felix Groß	neo-pro (Rad-Net Rose Team)
Álvaro Hodeg	Deceuninck–Quick-Step
Marc Soler	Movistar Team
Joel Suter	Bingoal Pauwels Sauces WB

Riders who left the team during or after the 2021 season

Rider	2022 team
Sven Erik Bystrøm	Intermarché–Wanty–Gobert Matériaux
Valerio Conti	Astana Qazaqstan Team
David de la Cruz	Astana Qazaqstan Team
Joe Dombrowski	Astana Qazaqstan Team
Alexander Kristoff	Intermarché–Wanty–Gobert Matériaux
Marco Marcato	Retired
Cristian Camilo Muñoz	EPM–Scott
Alexandr Riabushenko	Astana Qazaqstan Team

== Season victories ==
Date	Race	Competition	Rider	Country	Location	Ref.
26 January	Trofeo Calvià	UCI Europe Tour	Brandon McNulty (USA)	Spain	Palma Nova	
10 February	Tour of Oman, Stage 1	UCI ProSeries	Fernando Gaviria (COL)	Oman	Oman Convention and Exhibition Centre	
12 February	Vuelta a Murcia	UCI Europe Tour	Alessandro Covi (ITA)	Spain	Port of Cartagena	
15 February	Tour of Oman, Stage 6	UCI ProSeries	Fernando Gaviria (COL)	Oman	Matrah Corniche	
15 February	Tour of Oman, Points classification	UCI ProSeries	Fernando Gaviria (COL)	Oman		
17 February	Vuelta a Andalucía, Stage 2	UCI ProSeries	Alessandro Covi (ITA)	Spain	Alcalá la Real	
20 February	Vuelta a Andalucía, Points classification	UCI ProSeries	Alessandro Covi (ITA)	Spain		
23 February	UAE Tour, Stage 4	UCI World Tour	Tadej Pogačar (SLO)	United Arab Emirates	Jebel Jais	
26 February	UAE Tour, Stage 7	UCI World Tour	Tadej Pogačar (SLO)	United Arab Emirates	Jebel Hafeet	
26 February	UAE Tour, Overall	UCI World Tour	Tadej Pogačar (SLO)	United Arab Emirates		
26 February	UAE Tour, Young rider classification	UCI World Tour	Tadej Pogačar (SLO)	United Arab Emirates		
26 February	UAE Tour, Team classification	UCI World Tour	(Note: The riders in the squad were Pascal Ackermann, João Almeida, George Bennett, Mikkel Bjerg, Rafał Majka, Tadej Pogačar, and Maximiliano Richeze.)	United Arab Emirates		
26 February	Faun-Ardèche Classic	UCI ProSeries	Brandon McNulty (USA)	France	Guilherand-Granges	
1 March	Le Samyn	UCI Europe Tour	Matteo Trentin (ITA)	Belgium	Dour	
2 March	Trofeo Laigueglia	UCI ProSeries	Jan Polanc (SLO)	Italy	Laigueglia	
5 March	Strade Bianche	UCI World Tour	Tadej Pogačar (SLO)	Italy	Siena	
10 March	Paris–Nice, Stage 5	UCI World Tour	Brandon McNulty (USA)	France	Saint-Sauveur-de-Montagut	
10 March	Tirreno–Adriatico, Stage 4	UCI World Tour	Tadej Pogačar (SLO)	Italy	Bellante	
12 March	Tirreno–Adriatico, Stage 6	UCI World Tour	Tadej Pogačar (SLO)	Italy	Carpegna	
13 March	Tirreno–Adriatico, Overall	UCI World Tour	Tadej Pogačar (SLO)	Italy		
13 March	Tirreno–Adriatico, Points classification	UCI World Tour	Tadej Pogačar (SLO)	Italy		
13 March	Tirreno–Adriatico, Young rider classification	UCI World Tour	Tadej Pogačar (SLO)	Italy		
13 March	Paris–Nice, Young rider classification	UCI World Tour	João Almeida (POR)	France		
13 March	Paris–Nice, Team classification	UCI World Tour	(Note: The riders in the squad were João Almeida, Alexys Brunel, Finn Fisher-Black, Brandon McNulty, Juan Sebastián Molano, Jan Polanc, and Matteo Trentin.)	France		
18 March	Bredene Koksijde Classic	UCI ProSeries	Pascal Ackermann (GER)	Belgium	Koksijde	
20 March	Per sempre Alfredo	UCI Europe Tour	Marc Hirschi (SUI)	Italy	Sesto Fiorentino	
24 March	Volta a Catalunya, Stage 4	UCI World Tour	João Almeida (POR)	Spain	Boí Taüll	
27 March	GP Industria & Artigianato	UCI ProSeries	Diego Ulissi (ITA)	Italy	Larciano	
28 May	Giro d'Italia, Stage 20	UCI World Tour	Alessandro Covi (ITA)	Italy	Marmolada (Passo Fedaia)	
29 May	Boucles de la Mayenne, Stage 4	UCI ProSeries	Juan Sebastián Molano (COL)	France	Laval	
15 June	Tour of Slovenia, Stage 1	UCI ProSeries	Rafał Majka (POL)	Slovenia	Postojna	
17 June	Tour of Slovenia, Stage 3	UCI ProSeries	Tadej Pogačar (SLO)	Slovenia	Celje Castle	
18 June	Tour of Slovenia, Stage 4	UCI ProSeries	Rafał Majka (POL)	Slovenia	Velika Planina	
19 June	Tour of Slovenia, Stage 5	UCI ProSeries	Tadej Pogačar (SLO)	Slovenia	Novo mesto	
19 June	Tour of Slovenia, Overall	UCI ProSeries	Tadej Pogačar (SLO)	Slovenia		
19 June	Tour of Slovenia, Points classification	UCI ProSeries	Tadej Pogačar (SLO)	Slovenia		
18 June	Tour of Slovenia, Mountain classification	UCI ProSeries	Rafał Majka (POL)	Slovenia		
7 July	Tour de France, Stage 6	UCI World Tour	Tadej Pogačar (SLO)	France	Longwy	
8 July	Tour de France, Stage 7	UCI World Tour	Tadej Pogačar (SLO)	France	La Planche des Belles Filles	
20 July	Tour de France, Stage 17	UCI World Tour	Tadej Pogačar (SLO)	France	Peyragudes	
2 August	Tour de Pologne, Stage 4	UCI World Tour	Pascal Ackermann (GER)	Poland	Sanok	

== National, Continental, and World Champions ==
Date	Discipline	Jersey	Rider	Country	Location	Ref.
4 March	United Arab Emirates National Time Trial Championships		Yousif Mirza (UAE)	United Arab Emirates	Nazwa	
12 March	United Arab Emirates National Road Race Championships		Yousif Mirza (UAE)	United Arab Emirates	Kalba	
