= Vojtěch Řepa =

Czech cyclist (born 2000)

Personal information
- Born: 14 August 2000 (age 26) Velká Bíteš, Czech Republic
- Height: 1.84 m (6 ft 0 in)
- Weight: 71 kg (157 lb)

Cycling career
- Sport: Cycling
- Discipline: Road
- Role: Rider

Professional teams
- 2019–2020: Topforex–Lapierre
- 2021–2023: Equipo Kern Pharma
Medal record
Representing Czech Republic
Men's road bicycle racing
European Road Championships
Bronze medal – third place	2020 Plouay	Under-23 Road Race

Vojtěch Řepa (born 14 August 2000) is a Czech former cyclist, who competed as a professional from 2019 until May 2023.

== Major results ==
2018
3rd Road race, National Junior Road Championships
2020
National Under-23 Road Championships

1st Road race
3rd Time trial

1st Overall Tour of Małopolska

1st Young rider classification

3rd Road race, UEC European Under-23 Road Championships
2022
5th Overall Tour of Slovenia

1st Young rider classification

=== Grand Tour general classification results timeline ===
Grand Tour	2022
Giro d'Italia	—
Tour de France	—
Vuelta a España	77

Legend
—	Did not compete
DNF	Did not finish
