= Rafał Majka =

Polish road racing cyclist

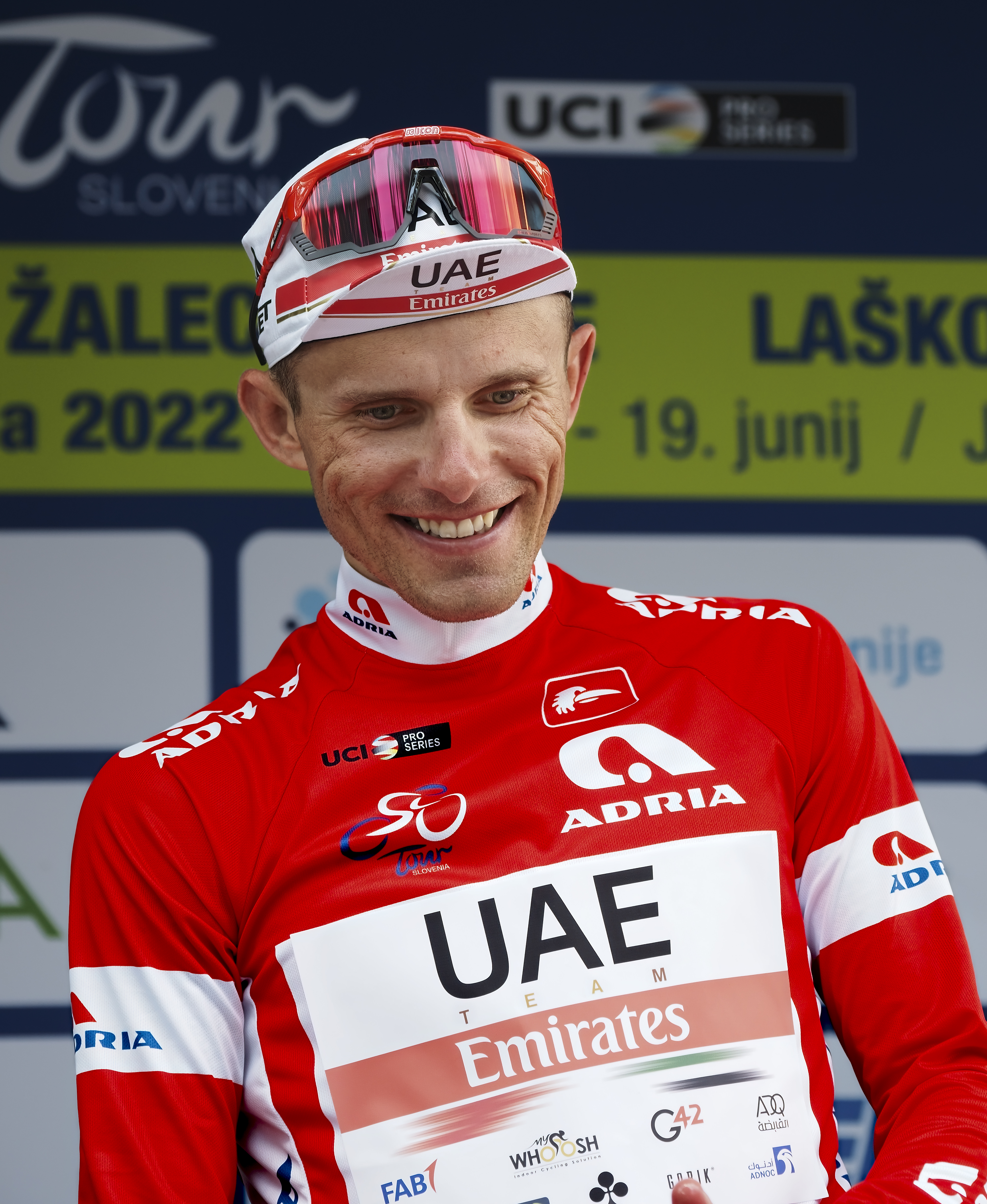
- Majka at the 2022 Tour of Slovenia

Personal information
- Full name: Rafał Majka
- Born: 12 September 1989 (age 37) Zegartowice, Poland
- Height: 1.73 m (5 ft 8 in)
- Weight: 58 kg (128 lb; 9 st 2 lb)

Cycling career
- Sport: Cycling
- Current team: Retired
- Discipline: Road
- Role: Rider
- Rider type: Climbing specialist

Amateur teams
- 2008–2009: Gragnano S.C.
- 2009: Miche–Silver Cross–Selle Italia (stagiaire)
- 2010: Petroli Firenze

Professional teams
- 2011–2016: Saxo Bank–SunGard
- 2017–2020: Bora–Hansgrohe
- 2021–2025: UAE Team Emirates

Major wins
- Grand Tours Tour de France Mountains classification (2014, 2016) 3 individual stages (2014, 2015) Vuelta a España 2 individual stages (2017, 2021) Stage races Tour de Pologne (2014) Tour of Slovenia (2017) One-day races and Classics National Road Race Championships (2016, 2025)
Medal record
Representing Poland
Men's road bicycle racing
Olympic Games
Bronze medal – third place	2016 Rio de Janeiro	Men's road race

Rafał Majka (Polish pronunciation: [ˈrafaw ˈmajka]; born 12 September 1989) is a Polish former professional road bicycle racer, who most recently rode for UCI WorldTeam UAE Team Emirates XRG. He is known as a strong climber, and rose to prominence at the 2013 Giro d'Italia, where he finished 7th overall, and 6th one year later; he has taken fifteen victories during his professional career.

Other major achievements are three mountainous stage wins in the Tour de France, two victories in the mountains classification at the race (2014 and 2016), and two stages and the overall victory at the 2014 Tour de Pologne. He achieved his only Grand Tour podium finish at the 2015 Vuelta a España, where he finished third.

At the 2016 Summer Olympics, he won a bronze medal for Poland in the road race.

== Career ==
=== Saxo Bank–SunGard (2011–2016) ===
==== 2011–2012 ====
Majka turned professional in February 2011, signing a contract with the Saxo Bank–SunGard team. He rode at the Vuelta a España, but withdrew in the final week.

At the Tour de l'Ain in August 2012, Majka finished second on the penultimate stage, losing out to Andrew Talansky in Septmoncel, having been part of a three-rider breakaway. In October, Majka won the white jersey for the best young rider at the Tour of Beijing, finishing in seventh overall, and finished in third place at the Japan Cup.

==== 2013 ====
In 2013, he competed in the Giro d'Italia for the first time, where he had a long battle with Carlos Betancur over the lead in the young rider classification, which eventually fell to Betancur in the penultimate stage. In the general classification, he ended up seventh, eight minutes behind winner Vincenzo Nibali. He led his home race, the Tour de Pologne for three days, before losing a podium on the final 37-kilometre (23-mile) individual time trial; he won the points classification alongside his fourth-place overall finish. He finished his season with podium finishes at Milano–Torino (second to Diego Ulissi), and the Giro di Lombardia (third).

==== 2014 ====
Prior to the Giro d'Italia, Majka won the white jersey at the Critérium International, finishing in fourth place overall. He was co-leader of Tinkoff–Saxo at the Giro d'Italia along with Nicolas Roche, and held third place overall for the middle third of the race. He lost two positions on the mountain stage to Val Martello before losing a further position on the 26.8-kilometre (16.7-mile) individual time trial which finished atop the Monte Grappa, ultimately falling to a sixth-place overall finish, which was one place better off than his 2013 result. He ultimately finished 7 minutes and 4 seconds down on the race winner, Nairo Quintana.

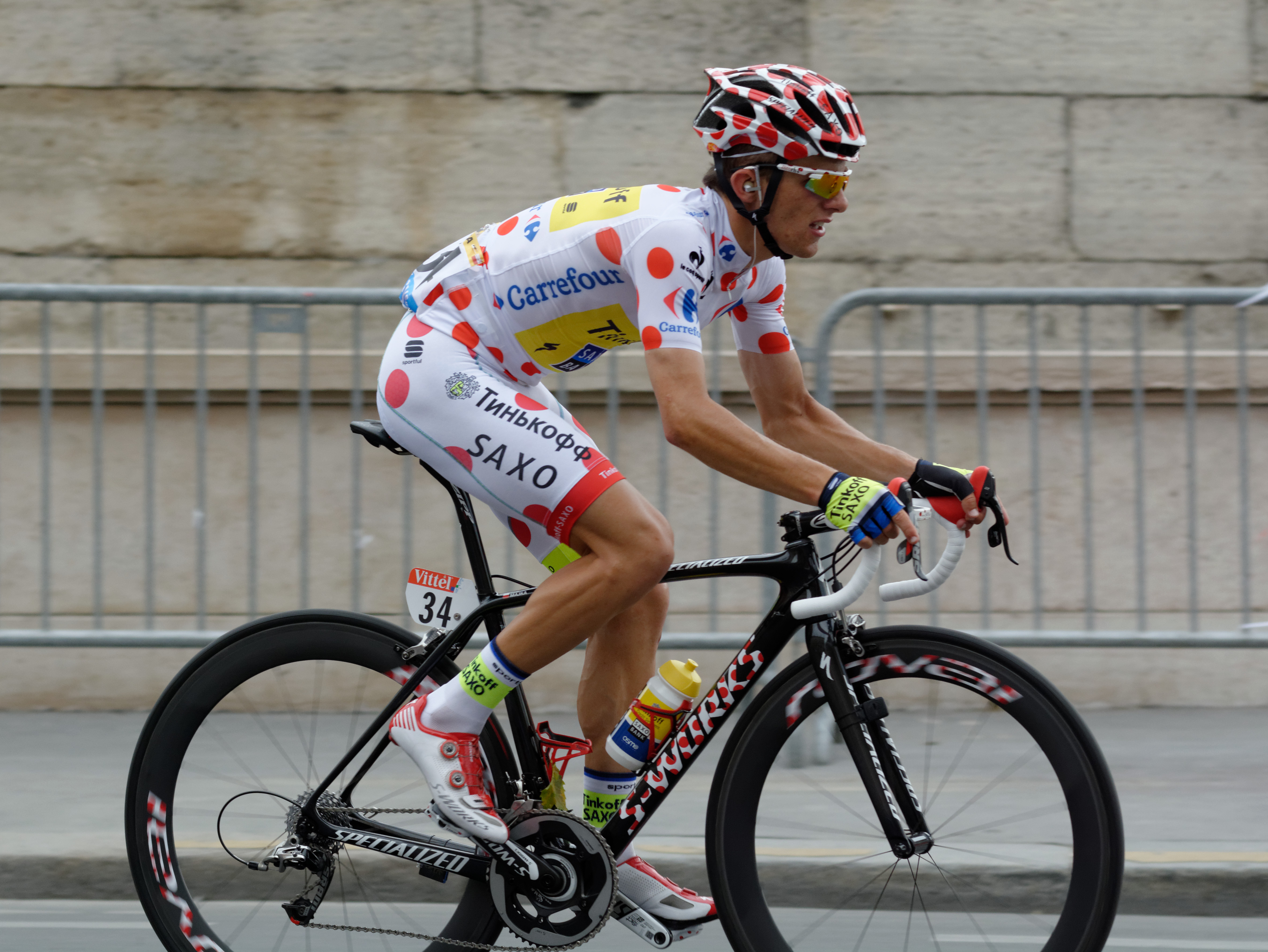
Majka in the polka-dot jersey, as leader of the mountains classification, at the 2014 Tour de France

Majka was a last-minute inclusion in Tinkoff–Saxo's Tour de France squad, after Roman Kreuziger was temporarily suspended from racing due to irregular biological passport values. Having finished second to Vincenzo Nibali on stage 13, Majka earned his first professional victory on stage 14 after going solo on the final climb to Risoul, become the first Polish Tour de France stage winner since Zenon Jaskuła in 1993. Four days later he claimed another victory on stage 17, soloing to the mountaintop finish atop Pla d'Adet. These successes, as well as some other strong performances in mountain stages, earned Majka the polka dot jersey as winner of the mountains classification, becoming the first Polish rider to win a jersey at the Tour de France.

A couple of weeks after the Tour de France, he won stages five and six of the Tour de Pologne – the first Polish stage victories at the race in a decade – to take the race lead ahead of the final 25-kilometre (16-mile) individual time trial around Kraków. Majka lost some of his eighteen-second lead on the final stage, but held on to win by eight seconds over Ion Izagirre, to become the first Polish rider to win the Tour de Pologne at UCI World Tour level, and the first home victory since Cezary Zamana in 2003. He contested one further race during the season, finishing fourth overall at the USA Pro Cycling Challenge, with a second-place finish in a two-up sprint to Tejay van Garderen at the Monarch Mountain ski resort being his best stage result.

==== 2015 ====
In contrast to the previous two years, Majka did not ride the Giro d'Italia in 2015 where Alberto Contador made the first step in trying to do a Giro–Tour double, but Majka did start in the Tour de France, having achieved top ten finishes at the Tour of Oman (fourth), the Tour de Romandie (seventh), and the Tour de Suisse (tenth), in preparation for the race. Majka won stage 11 of the Tour de France to Cauterets from a breakaway, to take his third Tour stage victory. Majka then prepared to race his season target, the Vuelta a España, attempting to gain a top 5 or podium finish in the general classification. He performed well throughout the entire race, being able to stay near to the top of the general classification behind the likes of Tom Dumoulin, Nairo Quintana and Fabio Aru. On the penultimate stage, stage 20, Majka managed to advance himself from fourth overall up to third, ultimately finishing on the podium of a Grand Tour for the first time. Before the end of the season, Majka recorded his second runner-up finish in three years at Milano–Torino, behind Diego Rosa.

==== 2016 ====
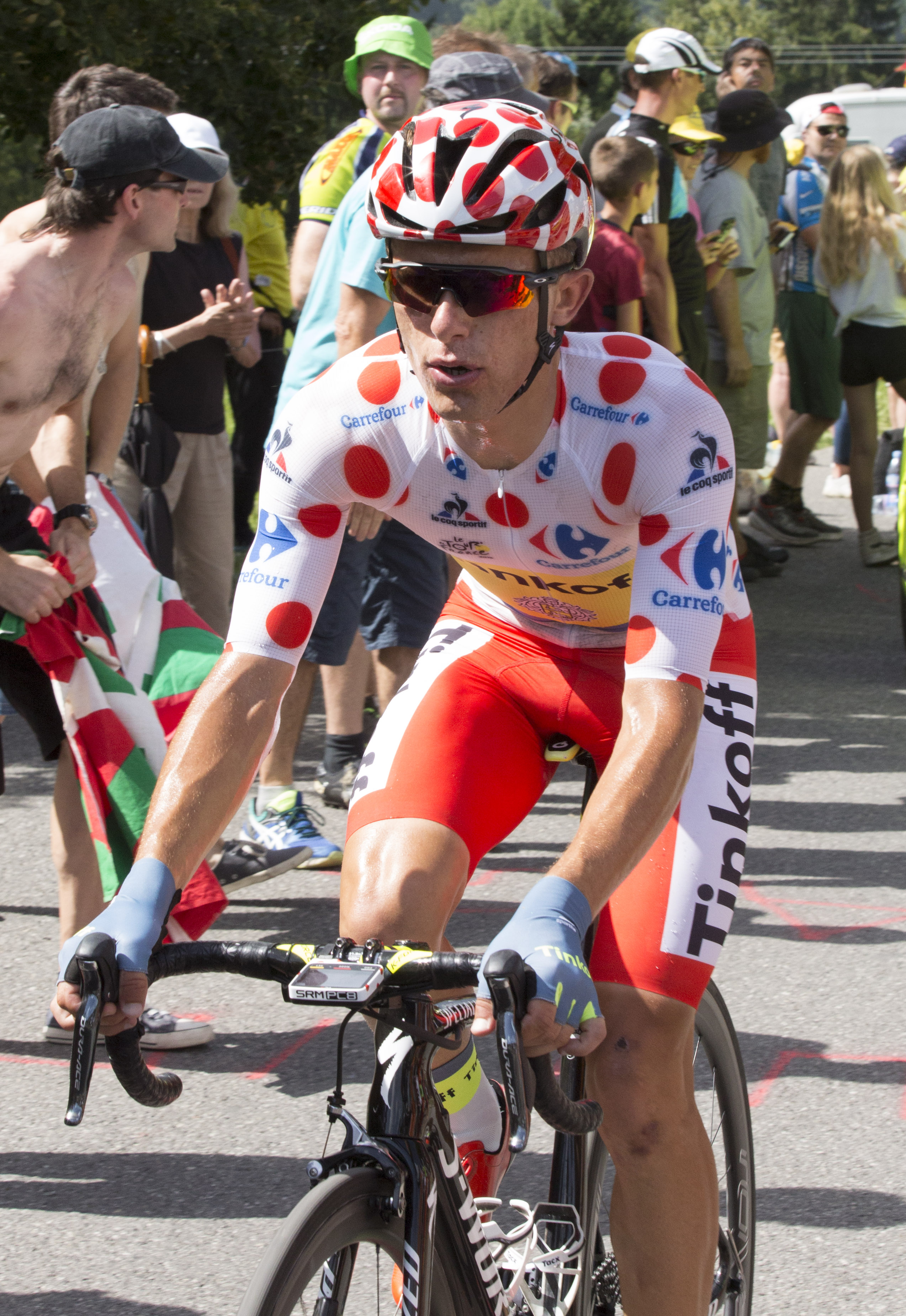
Majka at the 2016 Tour de France

In the early part of the season, Majka recorded top-ten overall finishes at the Tour de San Luis (seventh), and the Vuelta a Andalucía (fifth). At the Giro d'Italia, Majka raced as the leader of the Tinkoff team and finished fifth overall, four minutes behind winner Vincenzo Nibali, his best result to that point. Following the Giro d'Italia, Majka won the Polish National Road Race Championships for the first time in his career, breaking away at the front over the last climb and holding his advantage to the finish line. During the Tour de France, team leader Alberto Contador dropped out, leaving Majka as one of his team's chances for success. Through multiple breakaways, he was able to repeat his 2014 accomplishment and win the mountains classification, albeit falling short of a stage win, with four second- and third-place stage finishes.

At the Rio Olympics, Majka finished third in the individual road race, winning the bronze medal. He was part of a late breakaway group also containing Nibali and Sergio Henao. On the final descent, both Nibali and Henao crashed, leaving Majka alone in front, unable to preserve his advantage over the chase group to the finish. He was caught by eventual winner Greg Van Avermaet and Jakob Fuglsang within 2 kilometres (1.2 miles) of the finish line and did not participate in the final sprint, settling for third. Majka's medal was the first for Poland at the Rio Olympics, and the first medal won by a Polish male cyclist in an individual event since Czesław Lang's silver in the same event in 1980.

=== Bora–Hansgrohe (2017–2020) ===
In August 2016, Bora–Hansgrohe announced that Majka had agreed an initial two-year deal with the team from 2017, following Tinkoff teammate Peter Sagan to the squad with a role as a team leader in Grand Tours and other stage races.

Majka made his first start with Bora–Hansgrohe at the 2017 Trofeo Serra de Tramuntana, held as part of January's Vuelta a Mallorca one-day races; he finished seventh the following day in the Trofeo Andratx–Mirador des Colomer. Over the next few months, Majka recorded a sixth-place overall finish at the Abu Dhabi Tour, and tenth at Liège–Bastogne–Liège. At the Tour of California, Majka won the second stage in a two-up sprint against George Bennett in San Jose, and took the race lead as a result. Majka lost the race lead to Bennett on the penultimate stage, a 24-kilometre (15-mile) individual time trial around Big Bear Lake, and he ultimately finished second overall. He won the general and mountains classifications at the Tour of Slovenia, as well as winning the third stage. He also placed second in the Tour de Pologne, finishing as the highest-placed Polish rider. In September, Majka earned his first career stage win at the Vuelta a España when he won stage 14 – a high mountain stage – by holding off general classification favourites Miguel Ángel López, Vincenzo Nibali and Chris Froome by about thirty seconds.

Majka took top-five overall finishes in his first two starts of 2018, finishing fourth at the Vuelta a San Juan, and fifth at the Abu Dhabi Tour. He then added sixth-place finishes at the Tour of California in May, and the Tour of Slovenia in June. He rode both the Tour de France and the Vuelta a España, finishing in the top 20 of both, and he won the combativity award on stage 15 of the Tour de France. Majka finished his season with a seventh-place result at Il Lombardia in October, which meant that he endured a winless season for the first time since 2013.

Prior to the 2019 Giro d'Italia, Majka rode the Volta a Catalunya and the Tour of the Alps as warm-up races. He finished seventh at the Volta a Catalunya, before finishing one place higher at the Tour of the Alps, dropping from third place overall on the final stage due to a crash. At the Giro d'Italia, Majka started with a sixth-place finish on the opening stage, an 8-kilometre (5.0-mile) individual time trial which finished with a 2-kilometre (1.2-mile) climb – averaging more than 9% – to the Santuario della Madonna di San Luca in Bologna. He maintained this placing through the first five stages, before a large breakaway took the honours on stage six which resulted in Majka dropping towards the bottom of the top twenty placings. He moved back into the top ten after stage twelve, before moving up to fourth overall with a fourth-place stage finish two days later, at Courmayeur. He ultimately finished the race in sixth overall, moving up a position (ahead of Miguel Ángel López) on the final 17-kilometre (11-mile) individual time trial in Verona. After a top-ten overall placing at his home race, the Tour de Pologne, Majka rode the Vuelta a España as team leader for Bora–Hansgrohe; he spent all but one day in the top ten in the general classification, albeit going no higher than fifth, as he finished the race in sixth place overall.

Majka recorded a top-five finish at the 2020 UAE Tour, prior to the COVID-19 pandemic-enforced suspension of racing. Following the recommencing of racing in August, Majka recorded a fourth-place overall finish at his home race, the Tour de Pologne, before shifting his focus to Italian races. At September's Tirreno–Adriatico, Majka finished second to Michael Woods on the third stage, having bridged up to Woods on the penultimate climb before losing the final sprint in Saturnia. Majka maintained second place overall as Simon Yates took over the race lead following stage five, and ultimately finished third overall, as Geraint Thomas overhauled him in the final 10.1-kilometre (6.3-mile) individual time trial around San Benedetto del Tronto. Majka finished his season with the Giro d'Italia, where he finished in twelfth overall, losing more than twenty minutes in the final five stages.

=== UAE Team Emirates (2021–present) ===
In October 2020, Majka signed an initial two-year contract with UAE Team Emirates from the 2021 season, where he would act as a mountain domestique for Tadej Pogačar, who had won the Tour de France the previous month.

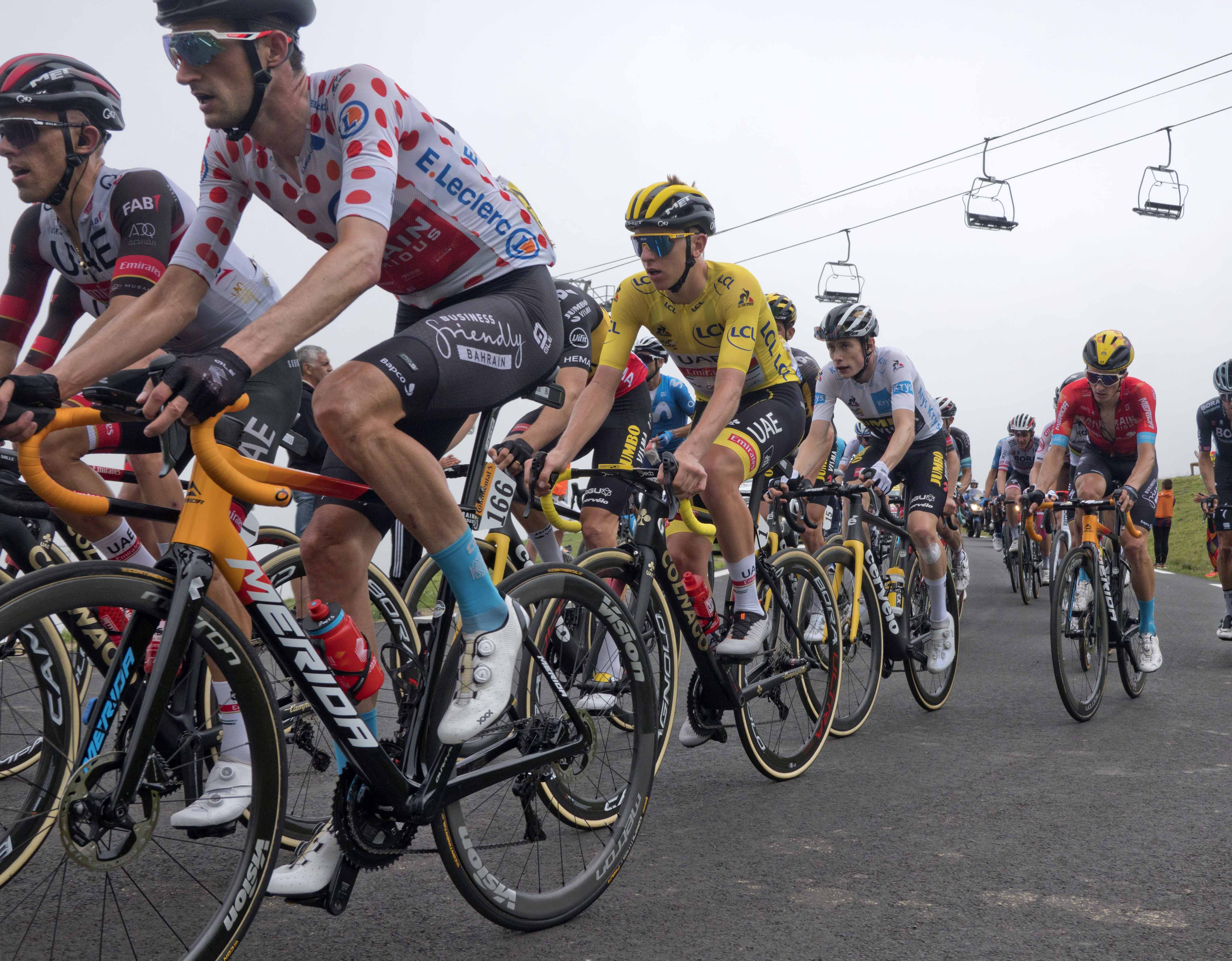
Majka (far left) leading his teammate Tadej Pogačar (in yellow) at the 2021 Tour de France, a race that Pogačar won for the second successive year

Majka's first high placing with UAE Team Emirates came at the 2021 Tour of Slovenia, where he finished in fourth place overall, behind teammates Pogačar and Diego Ulissi who went 1–2. As expected, Majka acted as a domestique for Pogačar at the Tour de France, with Pogačar having already won the UAE Tour and Tirreno–Adriatico, and he then went on to win his second consecutive Tour de France title. Majka then rode the Vuelta a España, in support of team leader David de la Cruz at the race. Having been a part of the breakaway on stage 9, Majka did so again on stage 15 before making a solo move with 87 kilometres (54 miles) remaining on the stage. He extended his gap to around 90 seconds, which he maintained all the way to the finish in El Barraco, taking his first victory since a stage win at the 2017 Vuelta a España.

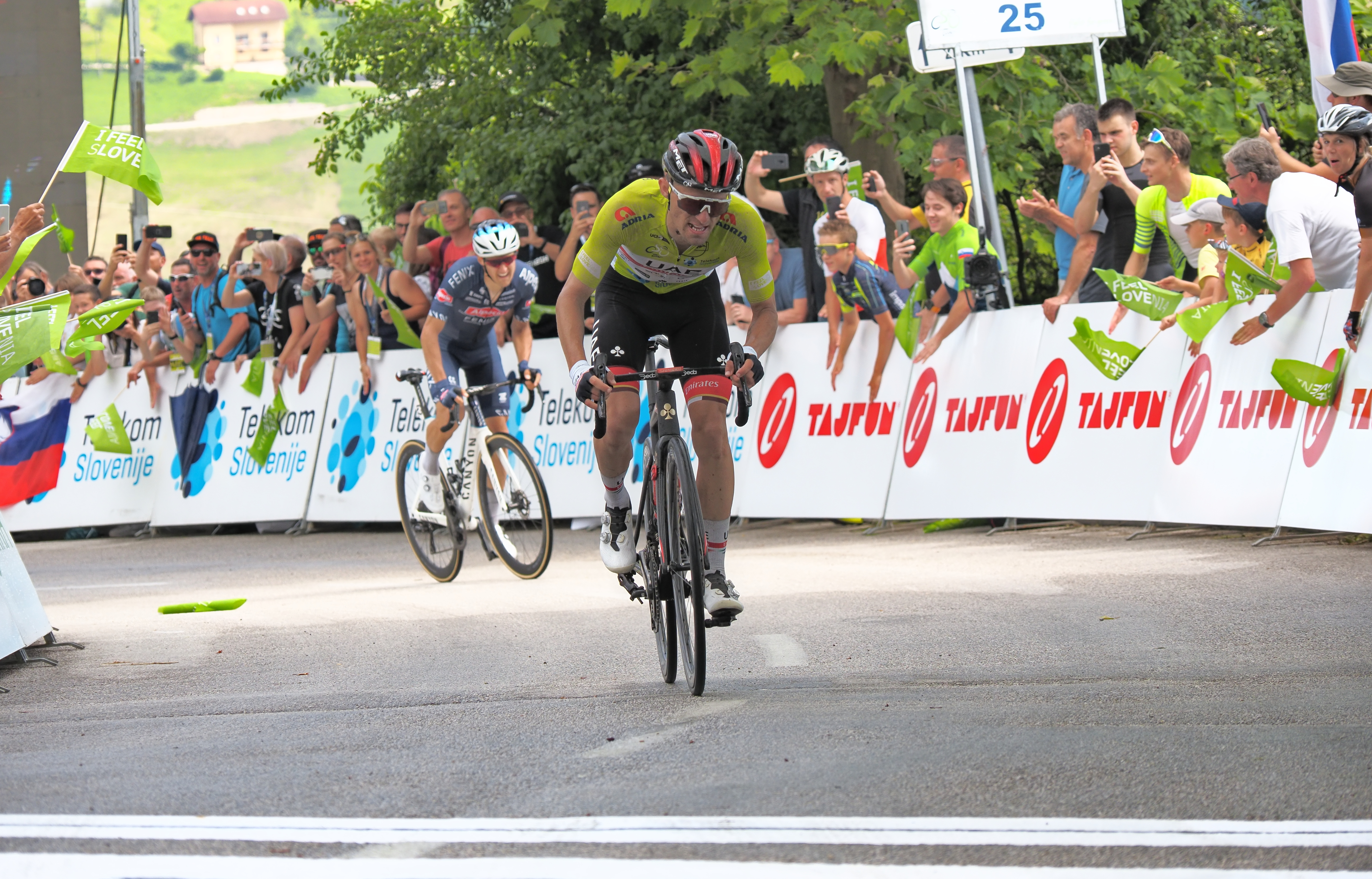
Majka, wearing the race leader's green jersey, at the 2022 Tour of Slovenia; he finished in second place overall behind teammate Tadej Pogačar, and also won the mountains classification

Majka started the 2022 season at the UAE Tour in February, riding in support of Pogačar, who won the race for a second successive year; Majka himself finished in seventh place overall, with an equivalent result on the final stage at the summit finish of Jebel Hafeet. At June's Tour of Slovenia, Majka and Pogačar were part of a three-rider move – along with Domen Novak – that went clear of the field with around 60 kilometres (37 miles) remaining on the opening stage. Majka ultimately attacked 1.5 kilometres (0.93 miles) before the finish in Postojna, and with Pogačar shadowing Novak behind, Majka won the stage by two seconds. Pogačar took the race lead on stage three following his stage victory on the uphill finish at Celje Castle, with Majka finishing second on the stage to hold the same position overall. The penultimate stage finished at Velika planina (English: Big Pasture Plateau), with Pogačar and Majka pulling clear from the group with 5 kilometres (3.1 miles) remaining and worked together towards the finish. Short of the line, Pogačar and Majka utilised the hand game of rock paper scissors to see who would win the stage between them, with Majka prevailing for his second stage win of the race. Majka added a third-place finish on the final stage as he finished second in the general and points classifications, and won the mountains classification. Majka was selected for the Tour de France, but failed to finish the race – he did not take the start of the 17th stage due to a laceration of his muscle, caused by his chain snapping in the previous stage. Following the Tour de France, Majka extended his contract for a further two years.

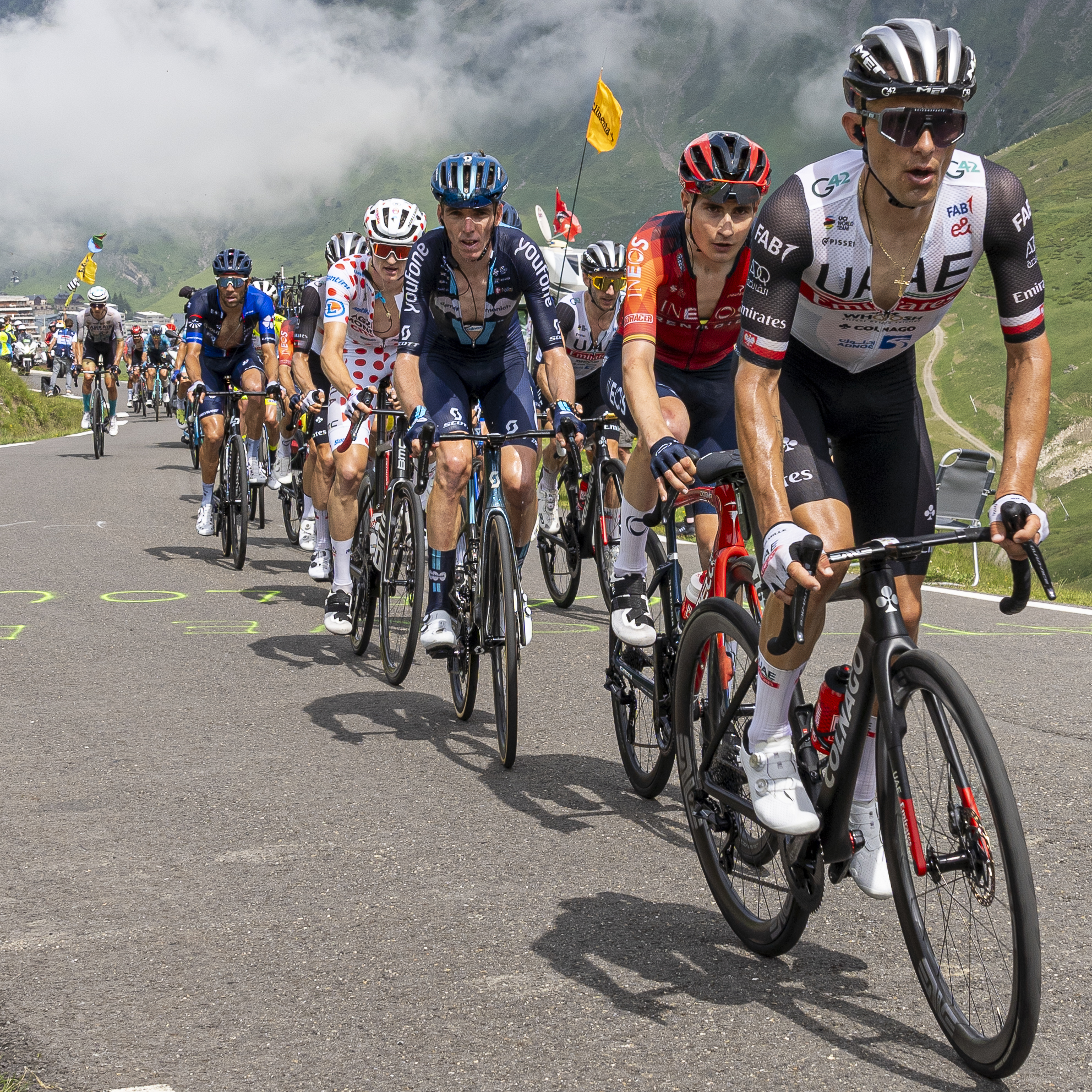
Majka leading a group of riders at the 2023 Tour de France

Majka recorded two consecutive top-ten overall finishes in April 2023, at the Giro di Sicilia (ninth), and the Tour de Romandie (tenth). He rode the Tour de France in support of team leader Pogačar, who had been aiming to regain his title following Jonas Vingegaard's victory in 2022. On the same day that Pogačar cracked and lost nearly six minutes to Vingegaard, Majka made it into the breakaway on stage 15 as a satellite rider and was able to provide support for Adam Yates later in the stage, who was also in a podium spot in the general classification. Yates lost less than two minutes to Vingegaard, maintaining his third position and would keep this position behind Vingegaard and Pogačar all the way to Paris, while Majka finished fourteenth. Majka then contested the Tour de Pologne, in support of team leader João Almeida, where he won the third stage of the race – on a steep uphill finish in Duszniki-Zdrój – by a wheel length from Matej Mohorič and Michał Kwiatkowski.

== Personal life ==
On 18 October 2014 he married Magdalena Kowal in a private ceremony in Wiśniowa. The couple have two children, born in February 2017 and November 2020 respectively.

== Major results ==
2008
1st Trofeo Enzo Sacchi
3rd GP Città di Monsummano
2009
1st Firenze–Viareggio
3rd Bologna–Raticosa
8th GP Capodarco
2010
2nd GP Chianti Colline d'Elsa
3rd Overall Giro delle Pesche Nettarine
3rd Bologna–Raticosa
3rd Trofeo Città di Lastra a Signa
9th Gran Premio Palio del Recioto
9th Firenze–Viareggio
10th Overall Carpathian Couriers Race

1st Stage 1

10th Trofeo Matteotti
2012
3rd Japan Cup
7th Overall Tour of Beijing

1st Young rider classification

2013
2nd Milano–Torino
3rd Giro di Lombardia
4th Overall Tour de Pologne

1st Points classification

7th Overall Giro d'Italia

Held after Stages 7, 10–14, 18–19

2014 (5 pro wins)
1st Overall Tour de Pologne

1st Stages 5 & 6

Tour de France

1st Mountains classification
1st Stages 14 & 17

4th Overall USA Pro Cycling Challenge
4th Overall Critérium International

1st Young rider classification

6th Overall Giro d'Italia

Held after Stages 8–15

2015 (1)
1st Stage 11 Tour de France
2nd Milano–Torino
3rd Overall Vuelta a España
4th Overall Tour of Oman
7th Overall Tour de Romandie
10th Overall Tour de Suisse
2016 (1)
1st Road race, National Road Championships
Tour de France

1st Mountains classification
Combativity award Stage 15

3rd Road race, Olympic Games
5th Overall Vuelta a Andalucía
5th Overall Giro d'Italia
7th Overall Tour de San Luis
2017 (4)
1st Overall Tour of Slovenia

1st Mountains classification
1st Stage 3

1st Stage 14 Vuelta a España
2nd Overall Tour of California

1st Stage 2

2nd Overall Tour de Pologne

1st Polish rider classification

6th Overall Abu Dhabi Tour
7th Trofeo Pollenca-Port de Andratx
10th Liège–Bastogne–Liège
2018
5th Overall Abu Dhabi Tour
5th Overall Vuelta a San Juan
6th Overall Tour of California
6th Overall Tour of Slovenia
7th Giro di Lombardia
Combativity award Stage 15 Tour de France
2019
6th Overall Giro d'Italia
6th Overall Vuelta a España
6th Overall Tour of the Alps
7th Overall Volta a Catalunya
9th Overall Tour de Pologne

1st Polish rider classification

10th Trofeo Campos, Porreres, Felanitx, Ses Salines
2020
3rd Overall Tirreno–Adriatico
4th Overall Tour de Pologne

1st Polish rider classification

5th Overall UAE Tour
2021 (1)
Vuelta a España

1st Stage 15
Combativity award Stage 15

4th Overall Tour of Slovenia
2022 (2)
2nd Overall Tour of Slovenia

1st Mountains classification
1st Stages 1 & 4

7th Overall UAE Tour
2023 (1)
8th Overall Tour de Pologne

1st Stage 3

9th Overall Giro di Sicilia
10th Overall Tour de Romandie
2024
2nd Overall Vuelta a Asturias
8th Overall Tour of Austria
2025 (1)
1st Road race, National Road Championships
3rd Overall Tour of Austria
8th Overall Tour de Pologne

1st Polish rider classification

=== General classification results timeline ===
Grand Tour general classification results
Grand Tour	2011	2012	2013	2014	2015	2016	2017	2018	2019	2020	2021	2022	2023	2024	2025
Giro d'Italia	—	—	7	6	—	5	—	—	6	12	—	—	—	15	13
Tour de France	—	—	—	44	28	27	DNF	19	—	—	34	DNF	14	—	—
Vuelta a España	DNF	32	19	—	3	—	39	13	6	—	21	—	—	—	
Major stage race general classification results
Stage races	2011	2012	2013	2014	2015	2016	2017	2018	2019	2020	2021	2022	2023	2024	2025
Paris–Nice	—	—	—	31	68	21	—	—	—	—	—	—	—	—	—
Tirreno–Adriatico	—	73	—	—	—	—	24	37	52	3	57	25	—	37	72
Volta a Catalunya	—	DNF	82	—	DNF	—	11	—	7	NH	—	—	36	—	—
Tour of the Basque Country	—	—	—	—	15	—	—	—	—	NH	39	35	—	—	—
Tour de Romandie	47	—	DNF	13	7	DNF	—	—	—	NH	—	—	—	10	—
Critérium du Dauphiné	34	—	—	—	—	—	—	—	—	—	—	—	14	—	—
Tour de Suisse	—	—	—	—	10	—	—	—	—	NH	—	—	—	—	—

=== Monuments results timeline ===
Monument	2011	2012	2013	2014	2015	2016	2017	2018	2019	2020	2021	2022	2023	2024
Milan–San Remo	Has not contested during his career													
Tour of Flanders	Has not contested during his career													
Paris–Roubaix	Has not contested during his career													
Liège–Bastogne–Liège	DNF	—	—	—	33	113	10	57	—	—	—	—	—	—
Giro di Lombardia	26	DNF	3	—	69	DNF	26	7	12	24	24	23	25	80

Legend
—	Did not compete
DNF	Did not finish
NH	Not held
