= Davide Gabburo =

Italian racing cyclist

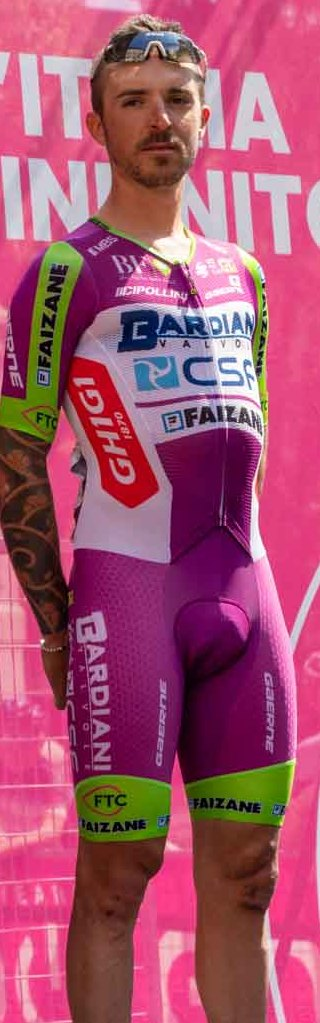
- Gabburo at the 2022 Giro d'Italia

Personal information
- Full name: Davide Gabburo
- Born: 1 April 1993 (age 33) Bovolone, Italy
- Height: 1.72 m (5 ft 8 in)
- Weight: 63 kg (139 lb)

Cycling career
- Sport: Cycling
- Current team: Retired
- Discipline: Road
- Role: Rider

Amateur teams
- 2012: Simaf Carrier Wega Truck Italia Valdarno
- 2013: Food Italia Mg K Vis Norda
- 2013: Ceramica Flaminia–Fondriest (stagiaire)
- 2015: General Store Bottoli Zardini
- 2016: Zalf–Euromobil–Désirée–Fior
- 2017: Big Hunter Beltrami Seanese

Professional teams
- 2018: Amore & Vita–Prodir
- 2019: Neri Sottoli–Selle Italia–KTM
- 2020: Androni Giocattoli–Sidermec
- 2021–2024: Bardiani–CSF–Faizanè

Davide Gabburo (born 1 April 1993) is an Italian former cyclist, who competed as a professional from 2018 to 2024.

== Major results ==
2011
3rd Trofeo San Rocco
6th GP Dell'Arno
10th Overall Tre Ciclistica Bresciana
2014
1st Stage 4 Grand Prix Cycliste de Gemenc
2015
2nd Road race, National Under-23 Road Championships
3rd Trofeo Banca Popolare di Vicenza
6th Trofeo Città di San Vendemiano
7th Gran Premio Industrie del Marmo
10th Giro dell'Appennino
10th Gran Premio di Poggiana
2017
9th Overall Tour of Bihor
2018
6th GP Adria Mobil
2019
3rd GP Slovenian Istria
5th Giro della Toscana
7th Eschborn–Frankfurt
9th Overall Settimana Internazionale di Coppi e Bartali
2020
7th Trofeo Laigueglia
2021
1st Grand Prix Alanya
5th Grand Prix Velo Alanya
7th Overall Tour du Limousin
8th Overall Czech Cycling Tour
2022
10th Overall Tour of Slovenia
2023
8th Giro della Provincia di Reggio Calabria
2024
1st Stage 4 Tour of Istanbul

=== Grand Tour general classification results timeline ===
| Grand Tour | 2021 | 2022 | 2023 |
|---|---|---|---|
| Giro d'Italia | 106 | 53 | 64 |
| Tour de France | — | — | |
| Vuelta a España | — | — | |

Legend
| — | Did not compete |
| DNF | Did not finish |
