= 2017 Liège–Bastogne–Liège =

Cycling race

2017 UCI World Tour, race 18 of 37

Race details
- Dates: 23 April 2017
- Stages: 1
- Distance: 258 km (160 mi)
- Winning time: 6h 24' 27"

Results
	Winner	Alejandro Valverde (ESP)	(Movistar Team)
	Second	Dan Martin (IRL)	(Quick-Step Floors)
	Third	Michał Kwiatkowski (POL)	(Team Sky)

The 2017 Liège–Bastogne–Liège was a road cycling one-day race that took place on 23 April. It was the 103rd edition of the Liège–Bastogne–Liège and the eighteenth event of the 2017 UCI World Tour. It was won for the fourth time by Alejandro Valverde.

== Teams ==
As Liège–Bastogne–Liège was a UCI World Tour event, all eighteen UCI WorldTeams were invited automatically and obliged to enter a team in the race. Seven UCI Professional Continental teams competed, completing the 25-team peloton.

UCI WorldTeams

- AG2R La Mondiale
- Astana
- Bahrain–Merida
- BMC Racing Team
- Bora–Hansgrohe
- Cannondale–Drapac
- Team Dimension Data
- FDJ
- Team Katusha–Alpecin
- LottoNL–Jumbo
- Lotto–Soudal
- Movistar Team
- Orica–Scott
- Quick-Step Floors
- Team Sky
- Team Sunweb
- Trek–Segafredo
- UAE Team Emirates

UCI Professional Continental teams

- Aqua Blue Sport
- Cofidis
- Direct Énergie
- Roompot–Nederlandse Loterij
- Sport Vlaanderen–Baloise
- Wanty–Groupe Gobert
- WB Veranclassic Aqua Protect

== Result ==
Result
Rank	Rider	Team	Time
1	Alejandro Valverde (ESP)	Movistar Team	6h 24' 27"
2	Dan Martin (IRL)	Quick-Step Floors	+ 0"
3	Michał Kwiatkowski (POL)	Team Sky	+ 3"
4	Michael Matthews (AUS)	Team Sunweb	+ 3"
5	Ion Izagirre (ESP)	Bahrain–Merida	+ 3"
6	Romain Bardet (FRA)	AG2R La Mondiale	+ 3"
7	Michael Albasini (SUI)	Orica–Scott	+ 3"
8	Adam Yates (GBR)	Orica–Scott	+ 7"
9	Michael Woods (CAN)	Cannondale–Drapac	+ 7"
10	Rafał Majka (POL)	Bora–Hansgrohe	+ 7"
