= Domen Novak =

Slovenian cyclist (born 1995)

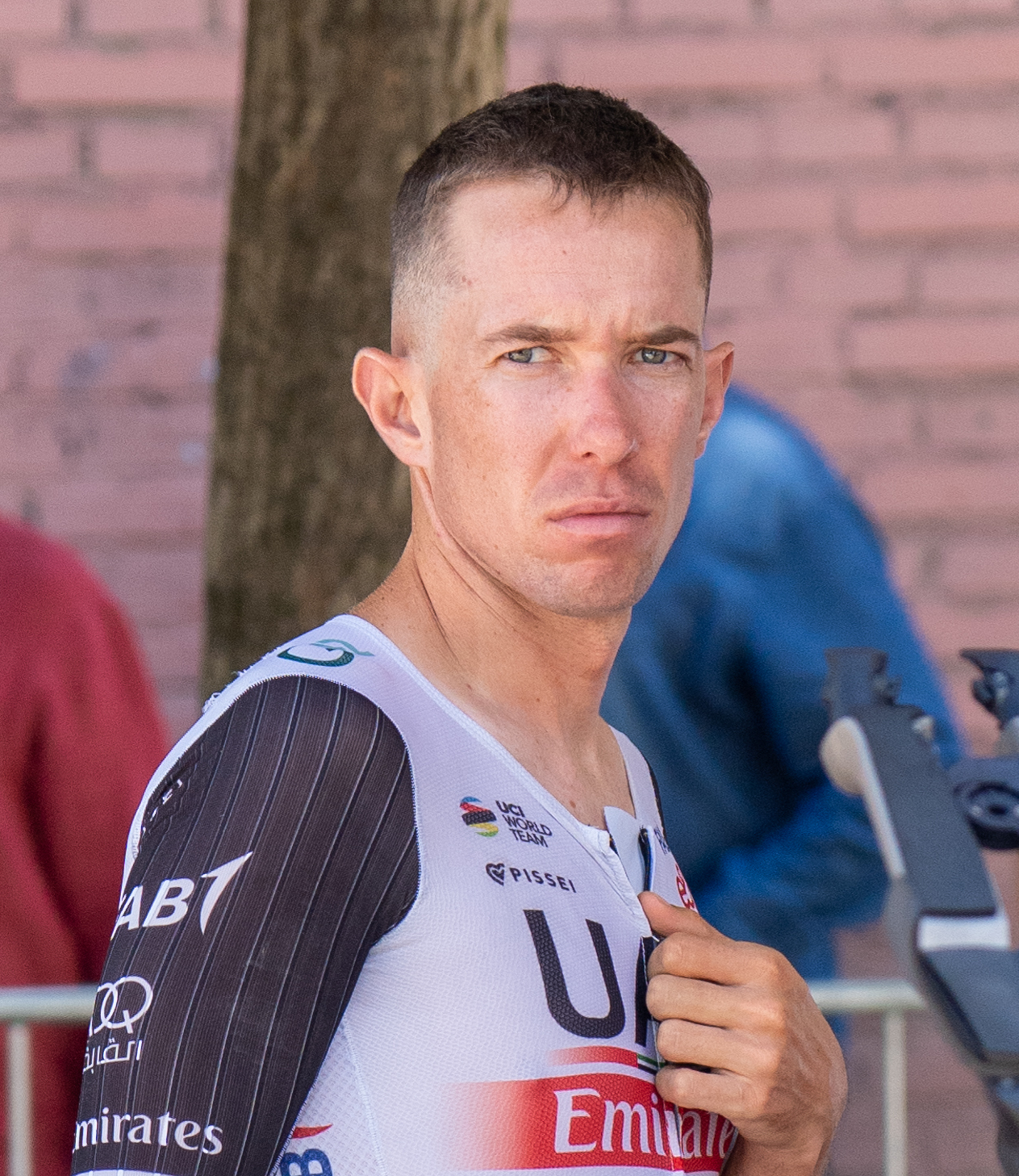
- Novak at the 2023 Vuelta a España

Personal information
- Born: 12 July 1995 (age 31) Novo Mesto, Slovenia
- Height: 181 cm (5 ft 11 in)
- Weight: 70 kg (154 lb)

Cycling career
- Sport: Cycling
- Current team: UAE Team Emirates XRG
- Discipline: Road
- Role: Rider
- Rider type: Rouleur, Domestique

Professional teams
- 2014–2016: Adria Mobil
- 2017–2022: Bahrain–Merida
- 2023–: UAE Team Emirates

Major wins
- Grand Tours Vuelta a España 1 TTT stage (2025) One-day races and Classics National Road Race Championships (2019, 2024)

Domen Novak (born 12 July 1995) is a Slovenian cyclist, who currently rides for UCI WorldTeam UAE Team Emirates XRG.

== Career ==
Novak turned professional in 2017 with UCI WorldTeam Bahrain–Merida, and was named in the startlist for the 2017 Vuelta a España. In May 2018, he was named in the startlist for the 2018 Giro d'Italia. The following year, he was crowned the Slovenian national road race champion. In 2023, he joined UAE Team Emirates as a domestique.

== Major results ==
2013
1st Road race, National Junior Road Championships
8th Road race, UEC European Junior Road Championships
2014
1st Young rider classification, Sibiu Cycling Tour
2015
1st Young rider classification, Tour of Slovenia
10th Giro del Belvedere
2016
Szlakiem Grodów Piastowskich

1st Mountains classification
1st Young rider classification

3rd Overall Tour of Małopolska

1st Young rider classification

3rd GP Laguna
6th Overall Tour of Croatia

1st Young rider classification

2017
7th Overall Tour of Japan

1st Young rider classification

2018
2nd Road race, National Road Championships
10th Overall Tour of Croatia
2019 (1 pro win)
1st Road race, National Road Championships
5th Overall CRO Race
2022
3rd Overall Tour of Slovenia
5th Road race, National Road Championships
2024 (1)
1st Road race, National Road Championships
2025
1st Stage 5 (TTT) Vuelta a España

=== Grand Tour general classification results timeline ===
Grand Tour	2017	2018	2019	2020	2021	2022	2023	2024	2025
Giro d'Italia	—	101	—	59	—	31	—	67	—
Tour de France	Has not contested during his career								
Vuelta a España	105	—	123	—	—	—	138	—	144

Legend
—	Did not compete
DNF	Did not finish
IP	In progress
