= 2022 Tour of Slovenia =

2022 UCI ProSeries
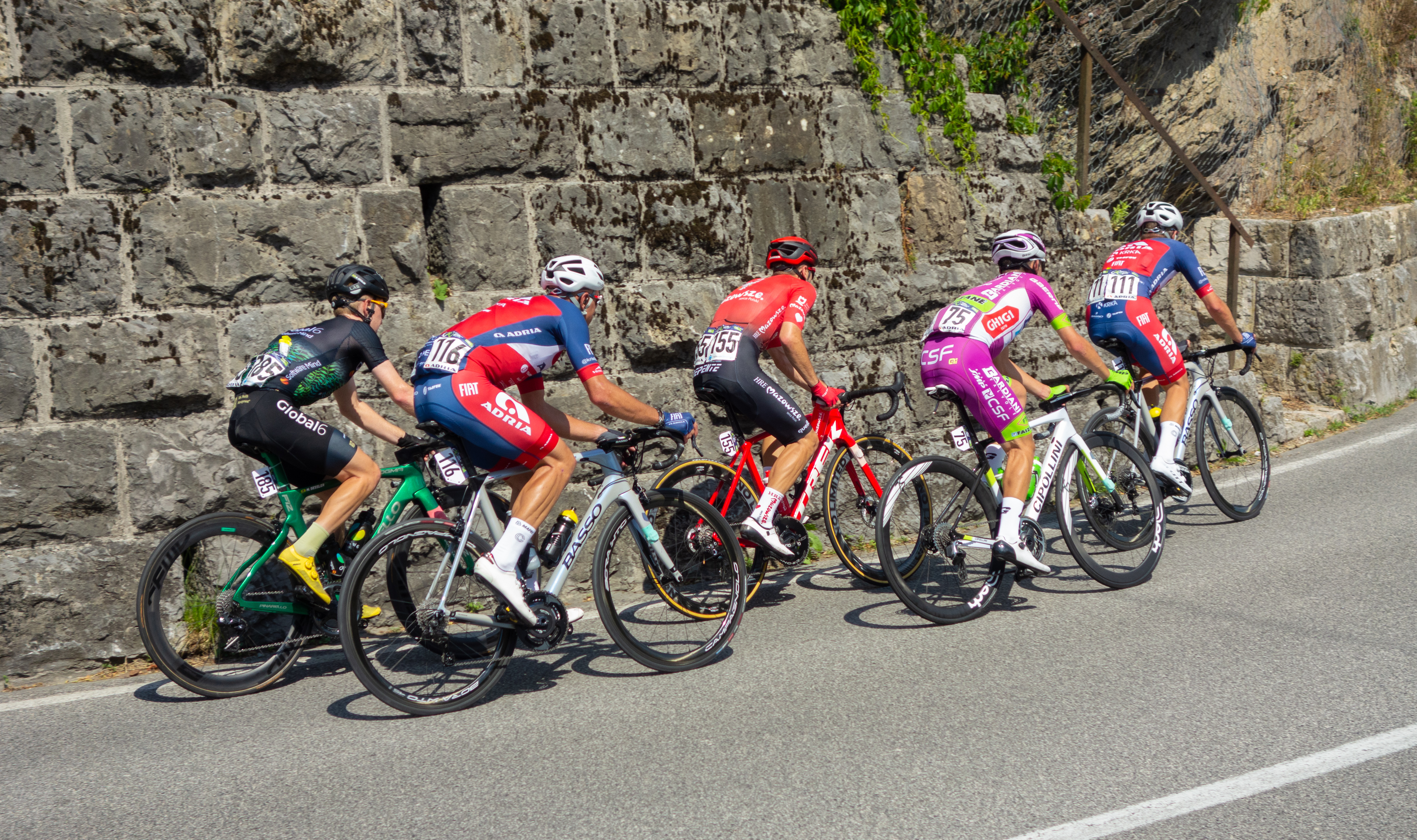
- Breakaway group on Stage 1

Race details
- Dates: 15–19 June 2022
- Stages: 5
- Distance: 791.6 km (491.9 mi)
- Winning time: 19h 18' 09"

Results
Jersey awarded to the overall winner	Winner	(Slovenia) Tadej Pogačar	(UAE Team Emirates)
	Second	(Poland) Rafał Majka	(UAE Team Emirates)
	Third	(Slovenia) Domen Novak	(Team Bahrain Victorious)
Jersey awarded to the points classification winner	Points	(Slovenia) Tadej Pogačar	(UAE Team Emirates)
Jersey awarded to the mountains classification winner	Mountains	(Poland) Rafał Majka	(UAE Team Emirates)
Jersey awarded to the young rider classification winner	Young rider	(Czech Republic) Vojtěch Řepa	(Equipo Kern Pharma)
	Team	(Spain) Caja Rural–Seguros RGA	

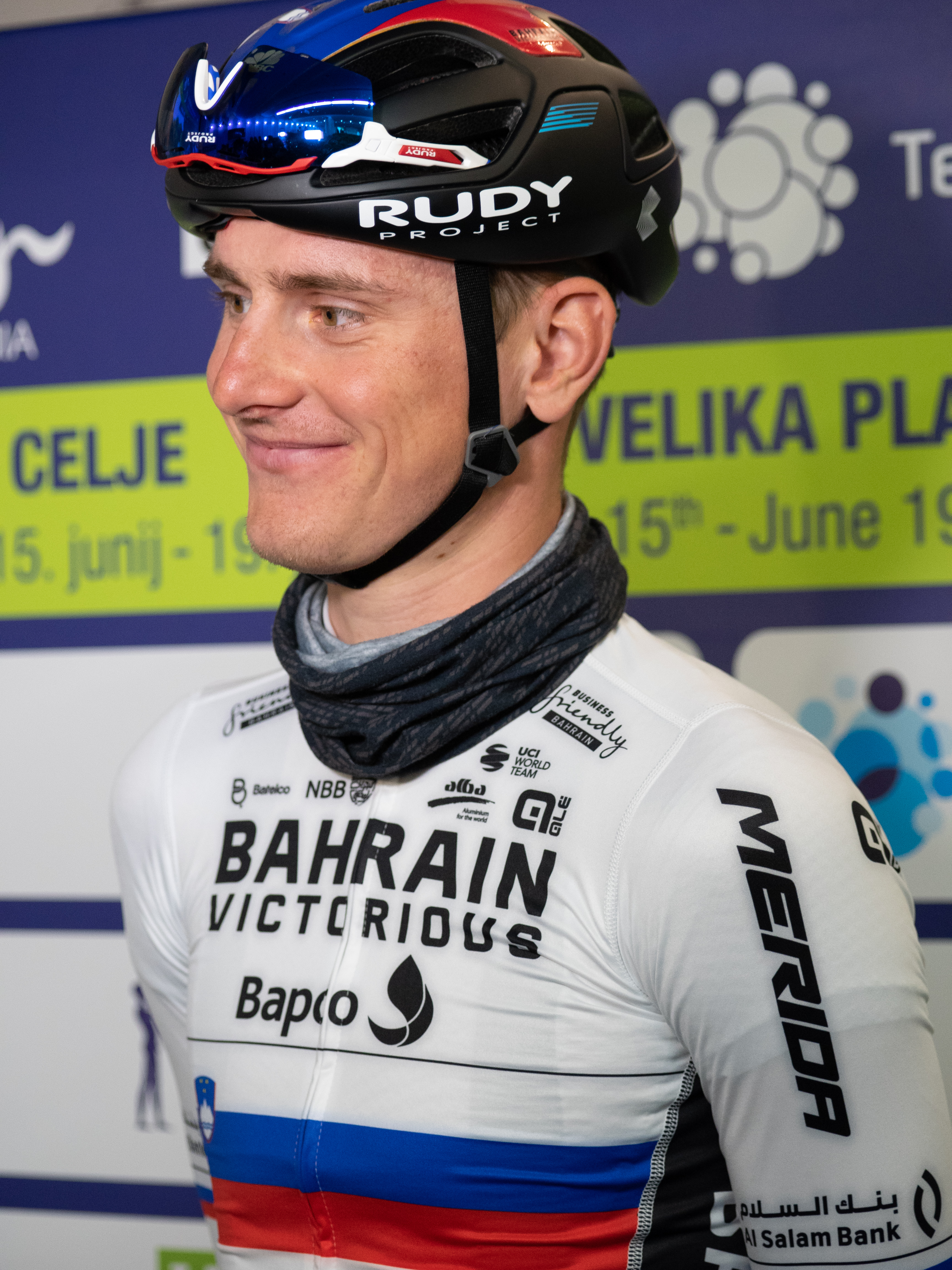
Matej Mohorič (Team Bahrain Victorious) on the Press conference with white jersey as an actual Slovenian road race champion

The 2022 Tour of Slovenia (Slovene: Dirka po Sloveniji) was the 28th edition of the Tour of Slovenia stage race scheduled between 15 and 19 June 2022. The 2.Pro-category race is a part of the UCI ProSeries. The tour was participated by defending Tour de France and Tour of Slovenia winner Tadej Pogačar and Matej Mohorič, first and sixth, respectively, by the UCI Men's road racing world ranking list (as of 15 June 2022).

The race was won for the second time in a row by Tadej Pogačar of UAE Team Emirates. Pogačar with his teammate Rafał Majka controlled the race and especially all of the climbs. The only other rider who was competitive in the ascents was Matej Mohorič (Team Bahrain Victorious). Powerful climbing duo Pogačar-Majka (UAE Team Emirates) showed to be strong competition against similar duo Roglič-Vingegaard from Team Jumbo–Visma (who showed domination in the 2022 Critérium du Dauphiné) for season main race - 2022 Tour de France. The Tour consisted of 5 stages with 791.4 km (491.8 mi) and 9.152 m of ascent. Total sum of prizes was €70,975 . Tour attracted around 300,000 people who were watching the race by the road. (Note: Official statement of Race director Bogdan Fink "...Dirka je postala s prenosom na Eurosportu še bolj mednarodno prepoznana, 300 tisoč navijačev ob cestah letošnje izvedbe pa je potrditev, da smo Slovenci tudi kolesarski narod.")

== Teams ==
Four UCI WorldTeams, seven UCI ProTeams, nine UCI Continental teams, and the Slovenian national team made up the twenty-one teams that participated in the race with 144 riders at the start (124 finished it).

UCI WorldTeams

- Astana Qazaqstan Team
- Team Bahrain Victorious
- Team BikeExchange–Jayco
- UAE Team Emirates

UCI ProTeams

- Alpecin–Fenix
- Bardiani–CSF–Faizanè
- Caja Rural–Seguros RGA
- Drone Hopper–Androni Giocattoli
- Eolo–Kometa
- Equipo Kern Pharma
- Euskaltel–Euskadi

UCI Continental Teams

- Adria Mobil
- China Glory Continental Cycling Team
- Cycling Team Kranj
- Dukla Banská Bystrica
- Global 6 Cycling
- HRE Mazowsze Serce Polski
- Ljubljana Gusto Santic
- ~~Team ColoQuick~~ MG.K Vis Colors for Peace VPM (Note: Team ColoQuick canceled their arrival in the very last minute and Italian team MG.K Vis Colors for Peace VPM will replace their spot)
- Team Felbermayr–Simplon Wels

National Teams

- Slovenia

== Route and stages ==
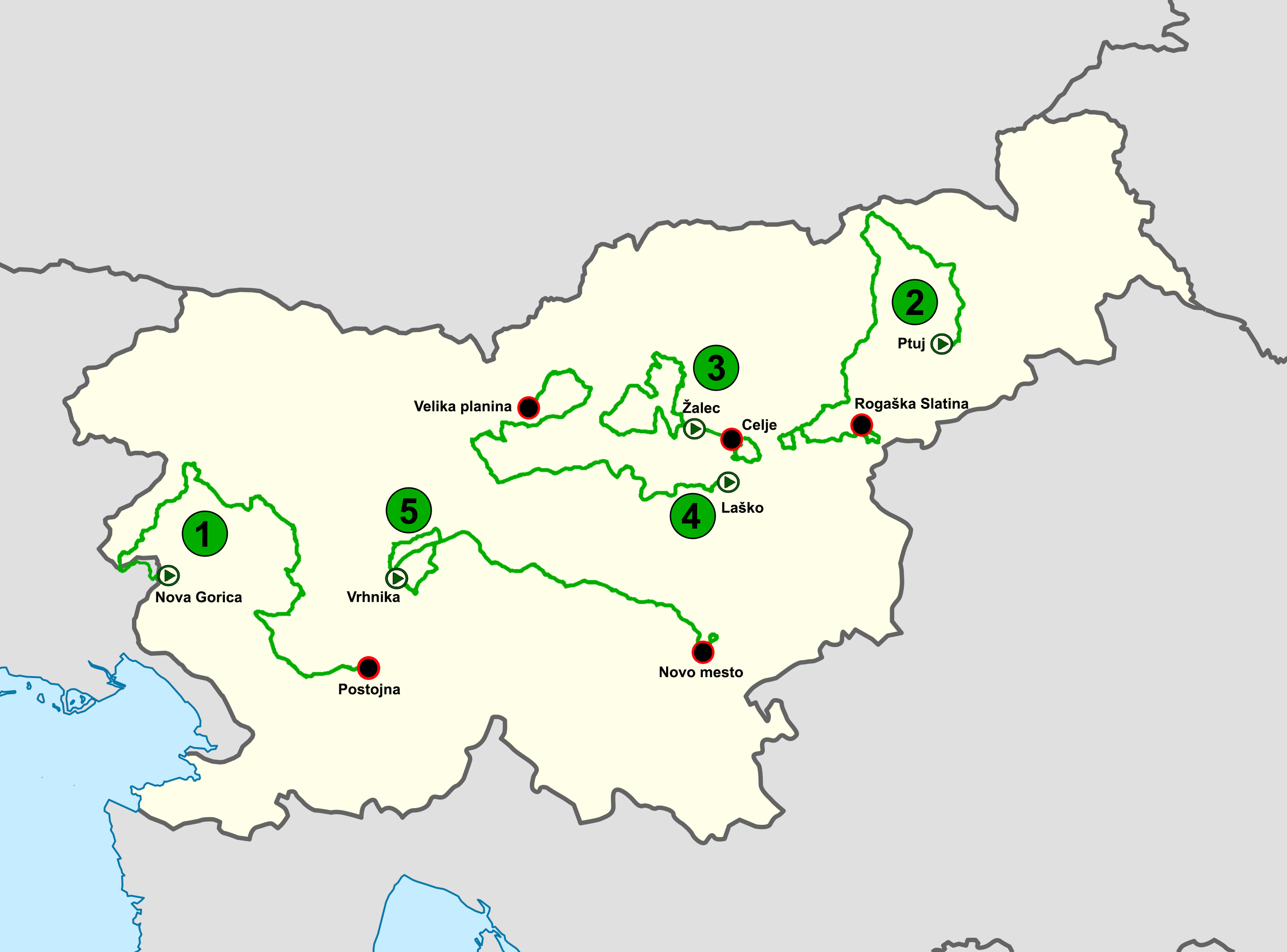

Stage characteristics and winners
Stage	Date	Course	Distance	Type	Winner
1	15 June	Nova Gorica – Postojna	164.7 km (102.3 mi)	Hilly stage	(Poland) Rafał Majka
2	16 June	Ptuj – Rogaška Slatina	174.1 km (108.2 mi)	Hilly stage	(Netherlands) Dylan Groenewegen
3	17 June	Žalec – Celje	144.6 km (89.9 mi)	Hilly stage	(Slovenia) Tadej Pogačar
4	18 June	Laško – Velika Planina	152.1 km (94.5 mi)	Mountain stage	(Poland) Rafał Majka
5	19 June	Vrhnika – Novo Mesto	156.1 km (97.0 mi)	Hilly stage	(Slovenia) Tadej Pogačar
Total			791.6 km (491.9 mi)		

=== Stage 1 ===
15 June 2022 – Nova Gorica to Postojna, 164.7 km (102.3 mi)

Stage 1

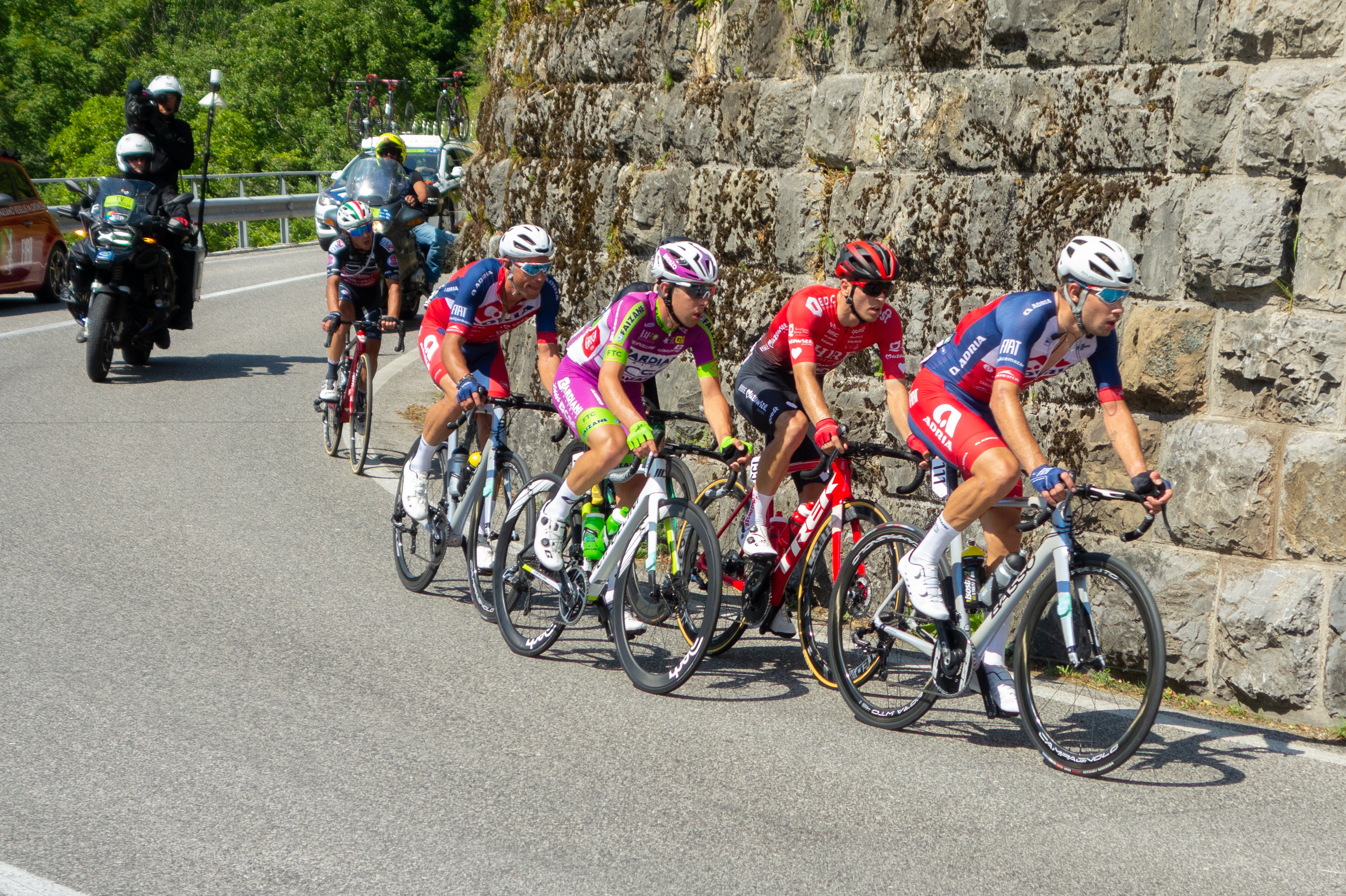
The main breakaway group on Stage 1.

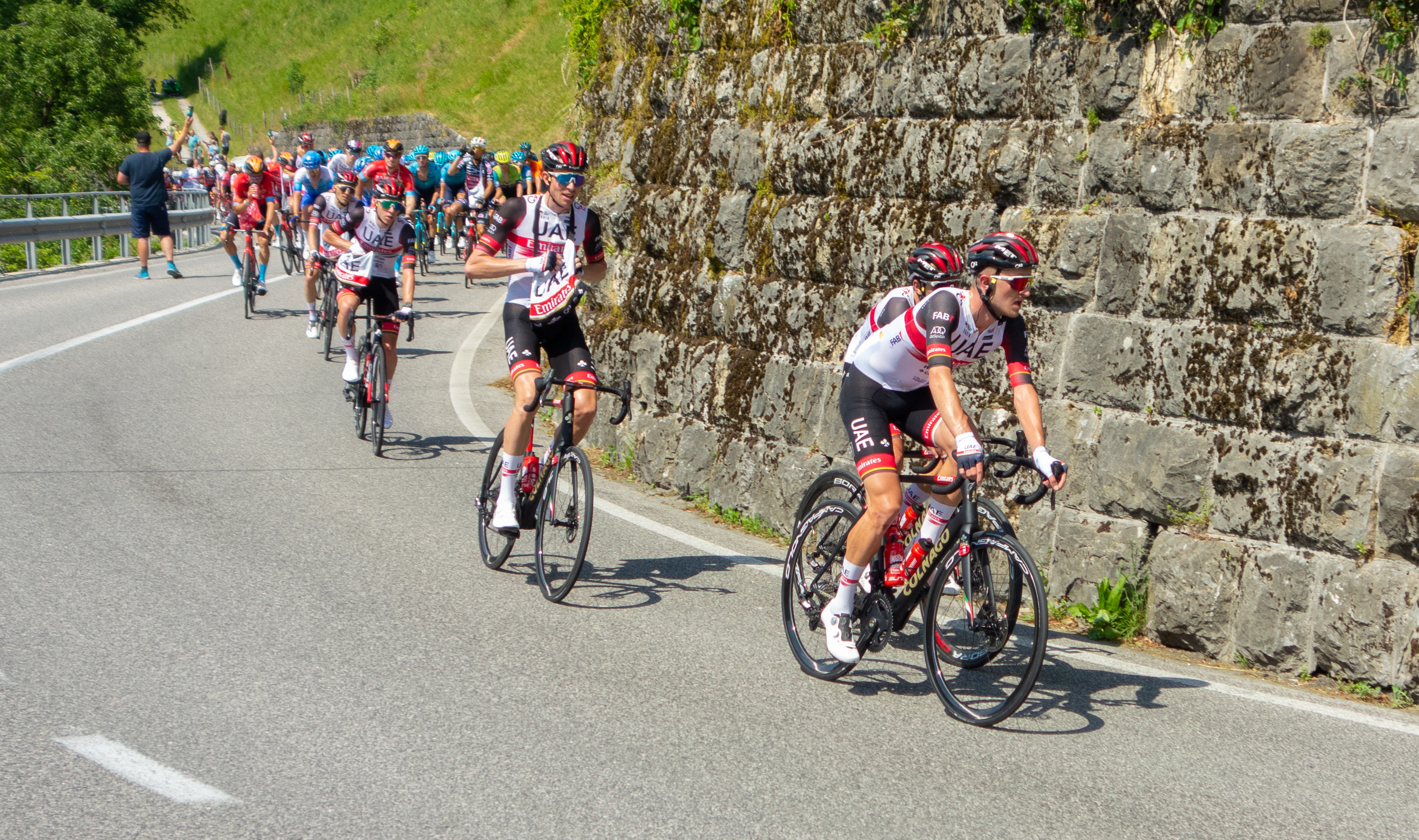
Peloton led by UAE Team Emirates

Rank	Rider	Team	Time
Official results
1	(Poland) Rafał Majka	UAE Team Emirates	4h 02' 10"
2	(Slovenia) Domen Novak	Team Bahrain Victorious	+ 2"
3	(Slovenia) Tadej Pogačar	UAE Team Emirates	+ 2"
4	(Italy) Vincenzo Albanese	Eolo–Kometa	+ 48"
5	(Slovenia) Luka Mezgec	Team BikeExchange–Jayco	+ 48"
6	(Italy) Nicola Conci	Alpecin–Fenix	+ 48"
7	(Slovenia) Matej Mohorič	Team Bahrain Victorious	+ 48"
8	(Spain) Fernando Barceló	Caja Rural–Seguros RGA	+ 48"
9	(Italy) Davide Gabburo	Bardiani–CSF–Faizanè	+ 48"
10	(Italy) Fabio Felline	Astana Qazaqstan Team	+ 48"
General classification after the stage
1	(Poland) Rafał Majka	UAE Team Emirates	4h 02' 00"
2	(Slovenia) Domen Novak	Team Bahrain Victorious	+ 6"
3	(Slovenia) Tadej Pogačar	UAE Team Emirates	+ 8"
4	(Italy) Vincenzo Albanese	Eolo–Kometa	+ 58"
5	(Slovenia) Luka Mezgec	Team BikeExchange–Jayco	+ 58"
6	(Italy) Nicola Conci	Alpecin–Fenix	+ 58"
7	(Slovenia) Matej Mohorič	Team Bahrain Victorious	+ 58"
8	(Spain) Fernando Barceló	Caja Rural–Seguros RGA	+ 58"
9	(Italy) Davide Gabburo	Bardiani–CSF–Faizanè	+ 58"
10	(Italy) Fabio Felline	Astana Qazaqstan Team	+ 58"

=== Stage 2 ===
16 June 2022 – Ptuj to Rogaška Slatina, 174.1 km (108.2 mi)

On hilly second stage Team Bahrain Victorious was led by Matej Mohorič and Jan Tratnik on the front trying to blew the peloton apart and get rid of classical sprinters (Tim Merlier, Pascal Ackermann, Dylan Groenewegen) in an effort to help their newest member Matevž Govekar who is part of Team Bahrain Victorious from 1 June 2022. Ackermann (UAE Team Emirates) and Merlier (Alpecin–Fenix) were both dropped but Ackermann was able to rejoin the peloton before the finish. Stage was won by Dylan Groenewegen with help of lead-out sprinter Luka Mezgec.

Stage 2

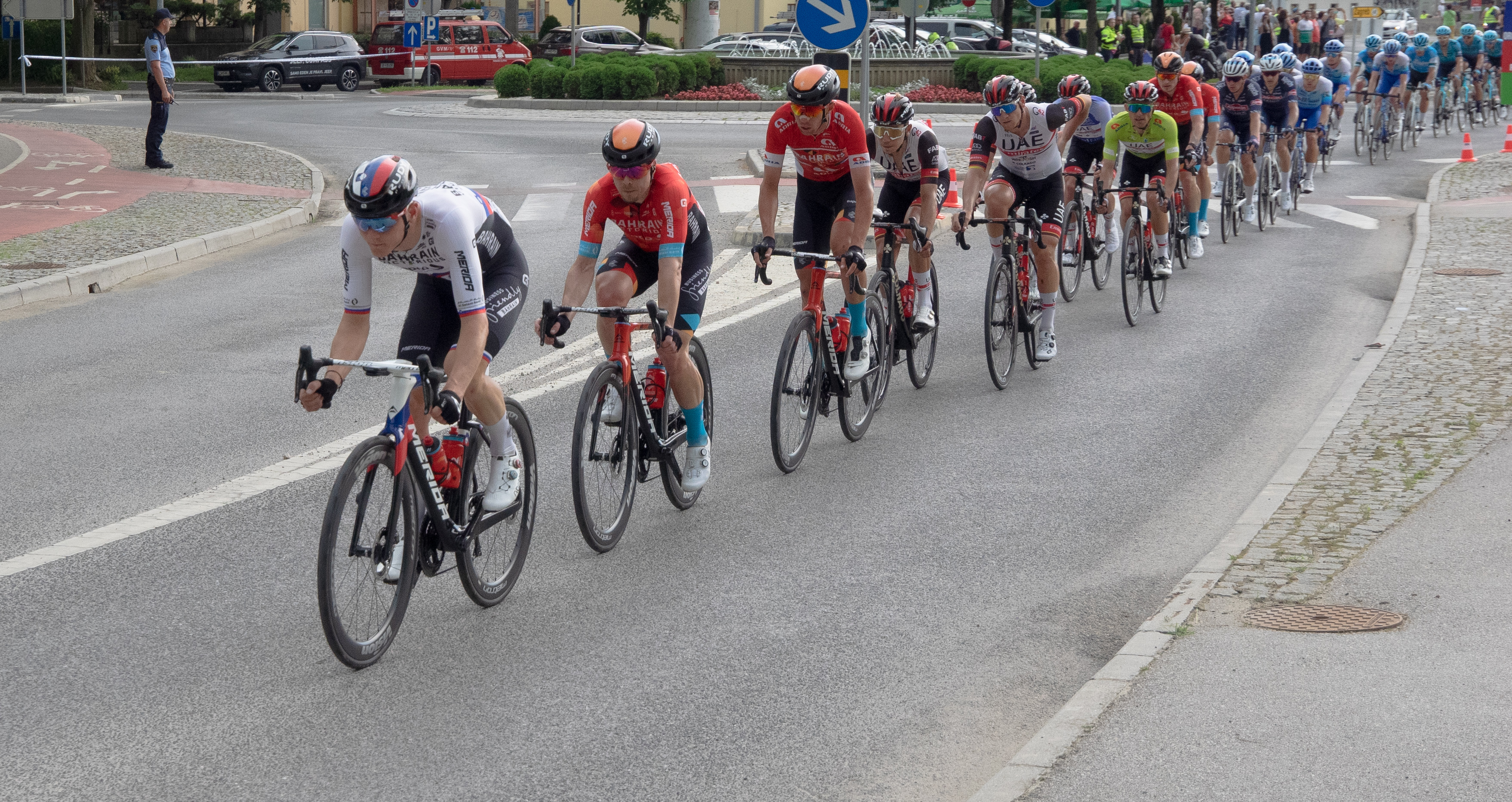
Team Bahrain Victorious pulling the leading group before the finish in Rogaška Slatina

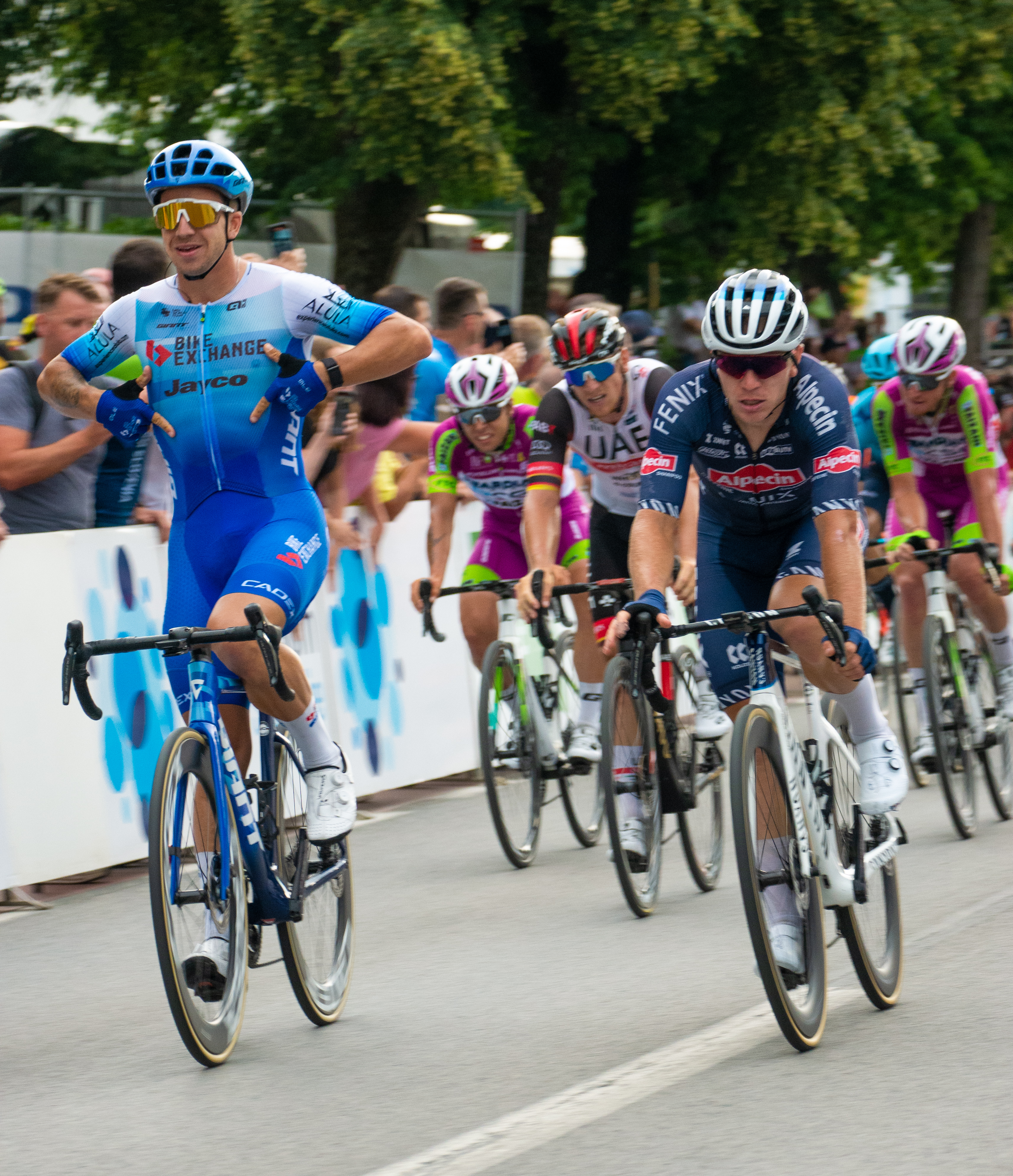
Dylan Groenewegen (Team BikeExchange–Jayco) celebrating win over Lionel Taminiaux (Alpecin–Fenix) in a reduced bunch sprint

Rank	Rider	Team	Time
Official results
1	(Netherlands) Dylan Groenewegen	Team BikeExchange–Jayco	4h 12' 51"
2	(Belgium) Lionel Taminiaux	Alpecin–Fenix	+ 0"
3	(Germany) Pascal Ackermann	UAE Team Emirates	+ 0"
4	(Italy) Filippo Fiorelli	Bardiani–CSF–Faizanè	+ 0"
5	(Italy) Luca Colnaghi	Bardiani–CSF–Faizanè	+ 0"
6	(Italy) Fabio Felline	Astana Qazaqstan Team	+ 0"
7	(Italy) Vincenzo Albanese	Eolo–Kometa	+ 0"
8	(Italy) Michele Gazzoli	Astana Qazaqstan Team	+ 0"
9	(Slovenia) Matevž Govekar	Team Bahrain Victorious	+ 0"
10	(Italy) Mattia Bais	Drone Hopper–Androni Giocattoli	+ 0"
General classification after the stage
1	(Poland) Rafał Majka	UAE Team Emirates	8h 14' 51"
2	(Slovenia) Domen Novak	Team Bahrain Victorious	+ 6"
3	(Slovenia) Tadej Pogačar	UAE Team Emirates	+ 8"
4	(Czech Republic) Vojtěch Řepa	Equipo Kern Pharma	+ 55"
5	(Italy) Vincenzo Albanese	Eolo–Kometa	+ 58"
6	(Italy) Fabio Felline	Astana Qazaqstan Team	+ 58"
7	(Italy) Davide Gabburo	Bardiani–CSF–Faizanè	+ 58"
8	(Italy) Nicola Conci	Alpecin–Fenix	+ 58"
9	(Slovenia) Luka Mezgec	Team BikeExchange–Jayco	+ 58"
10	(Spain) Joel Nicolau	Caja Rural–Seguros RGA	+ 58"

=== Stage 3 ===
17 June 2022 – Žalec to Celje, 144.6 km (89.9 mi)

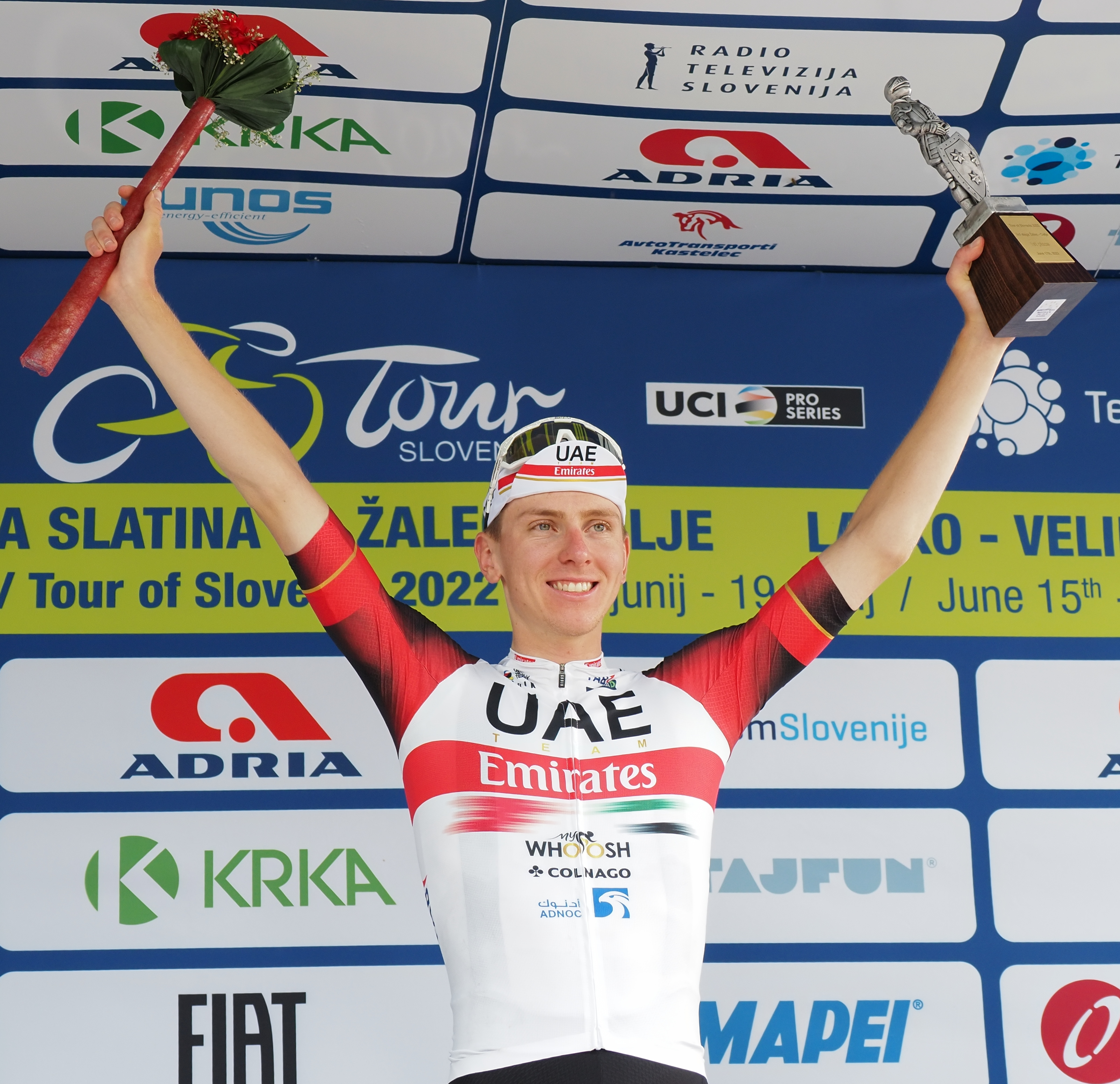
Tadej Pogačar won the Stage 3 (Celje Castle). This was his second win on Celje Castle climb (first was done on similar Stage 2, 2021 Tour of Slovenia)

Rank	Rider	Team	Time
Official results
1	(Slovenia) Tadej Pogačar	UAE Team Emirates	3h 27' 09"
2	(Poland) Rafał Majka	UAE Team Emirates	+ 11"
3	(Italy) Nicola Conci	Alpecin–Fenix	+ 14"
4	(Slovenia) Luka Mezgec	Team BikeExchange–Jayco	+ 36"
5	(Italy) Vincenzo Albanese	Eolo–Kometa	+ 36"
6	(Slovenia) Matej Mohorič	Team Bahrain Victorious	+ 36"
7	(Italy) Davide Gabburo	Bardiani–CSF–Faizanè	+ 37"
8	(Spain) Fernando Barceló	Caja Rural–Seguros RGA	+ 37"
9	(Italy) Luca Chirico	Drone Hopper–Androni Giocattoli	+ 41"
10	(Spain) Joel Nicolau	Caja Rural–Seguros RGA	+ 43"
General classification after the stage
1	(Slovenia) Tadej Pogačar	UAE Team Emirates	11h 41' 58"
2	(Poland) Rafał Majka	UAE Team Emirates	+ 7"
3	(Slovenia) Domen Novak	Team Bahrain Victorious	+ 55"
4	(Italy) Nicola Conci	Alpecin–Fenix	+ 1' 10"
5	(Italy) Vincenzo Albanese	Eolo–Kometa	+ 1' 36"
6	(Slovenia) Luka Mezgec	Team BikeExchange–Jayco	+ 1' 36"
7	(Slovenia) Matej Mohorič	Team Bahrain Victorious	+ 1' 36"
8	(Italy) Davide Gabburo	Bardiani–CSF–Faizanè	+ 1' 37"
9	(Spain) Joel Nicolau	Caja Rural–Seguros RGA	+ 1' 43"
10	(Czech Republic) Vojtěch Řepa	Equipo Kern Pharma	+ 1' 43"

=== Stage 4 ===
18 June 2022 – Laško to Velika Planina, 152.5 km (94.8 mi)

Mountain stage with two Cat.3 climbs (Jesenovo; 2.8 km at 6.9%, Trojane; 2.4 km at 8.2%), one Cat.2 climb (Črnivec; 10.6 km at 5.7%) and one Cat.1 climb (Velika Planina; 8.2 km at 7.6%) showed utter dominance by Rafał Majka and Tadej Pogačar (both UAE Team Emirates) where winner was solved with Rock paper scissors hand game before the finish line.

Stage 3
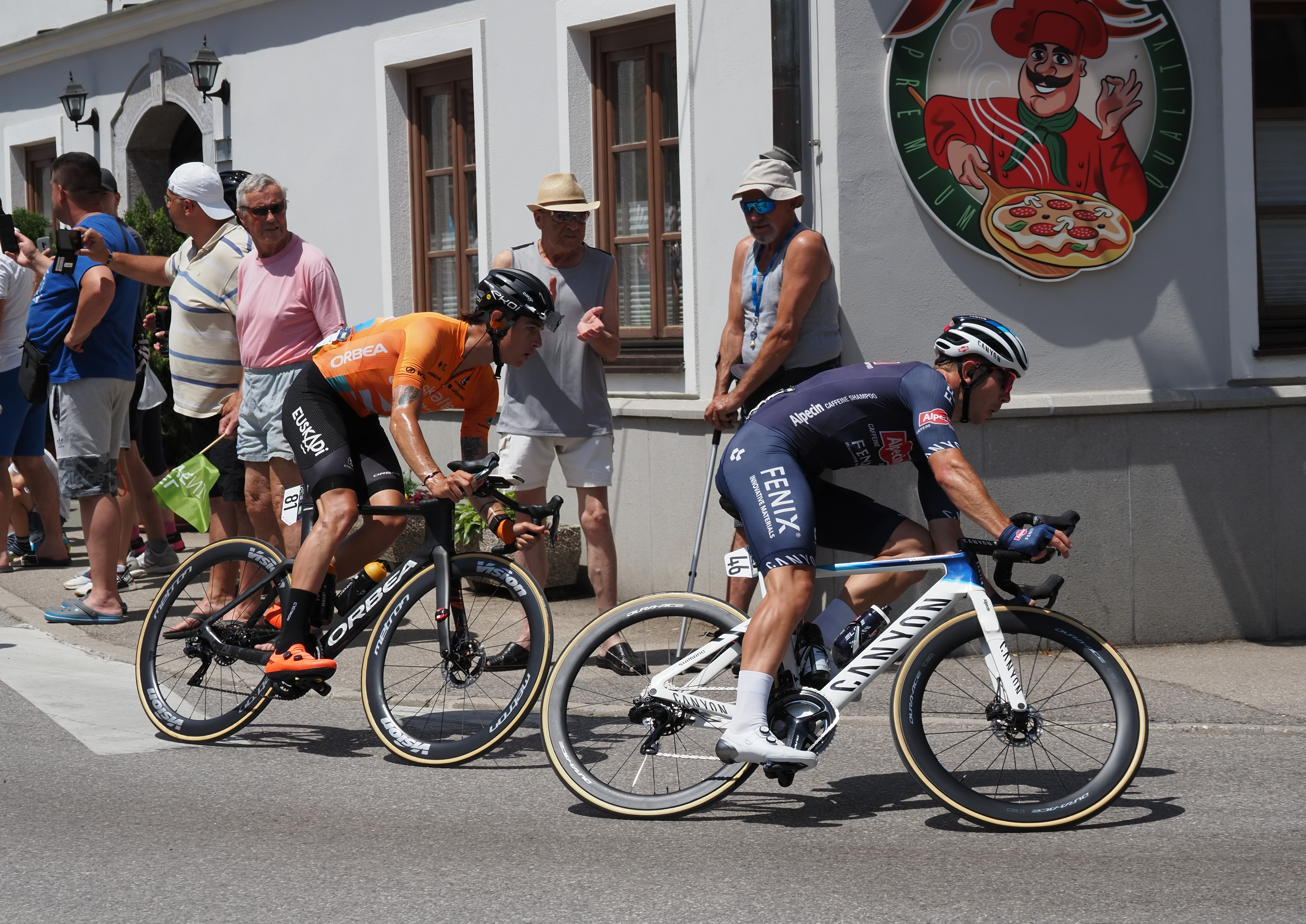
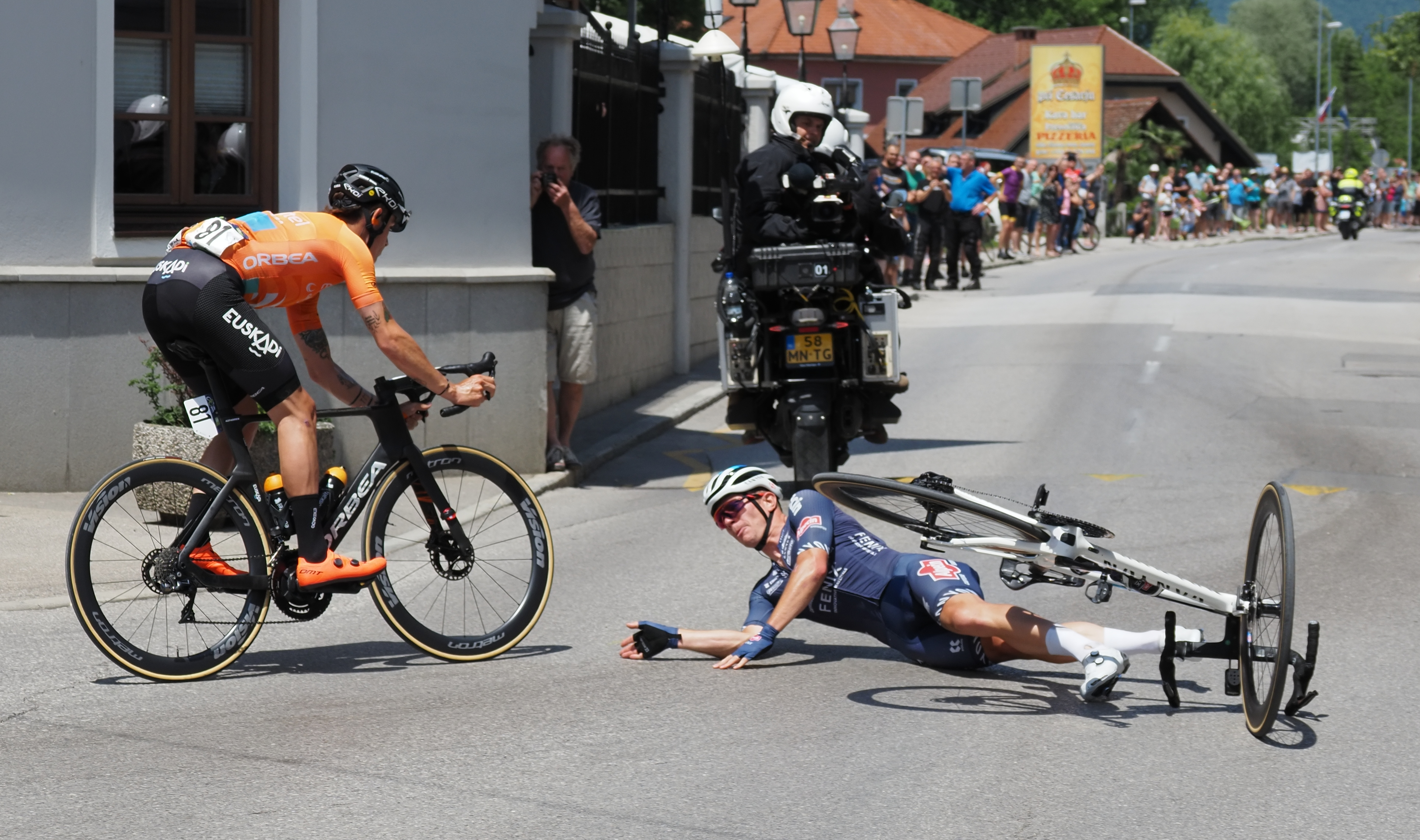
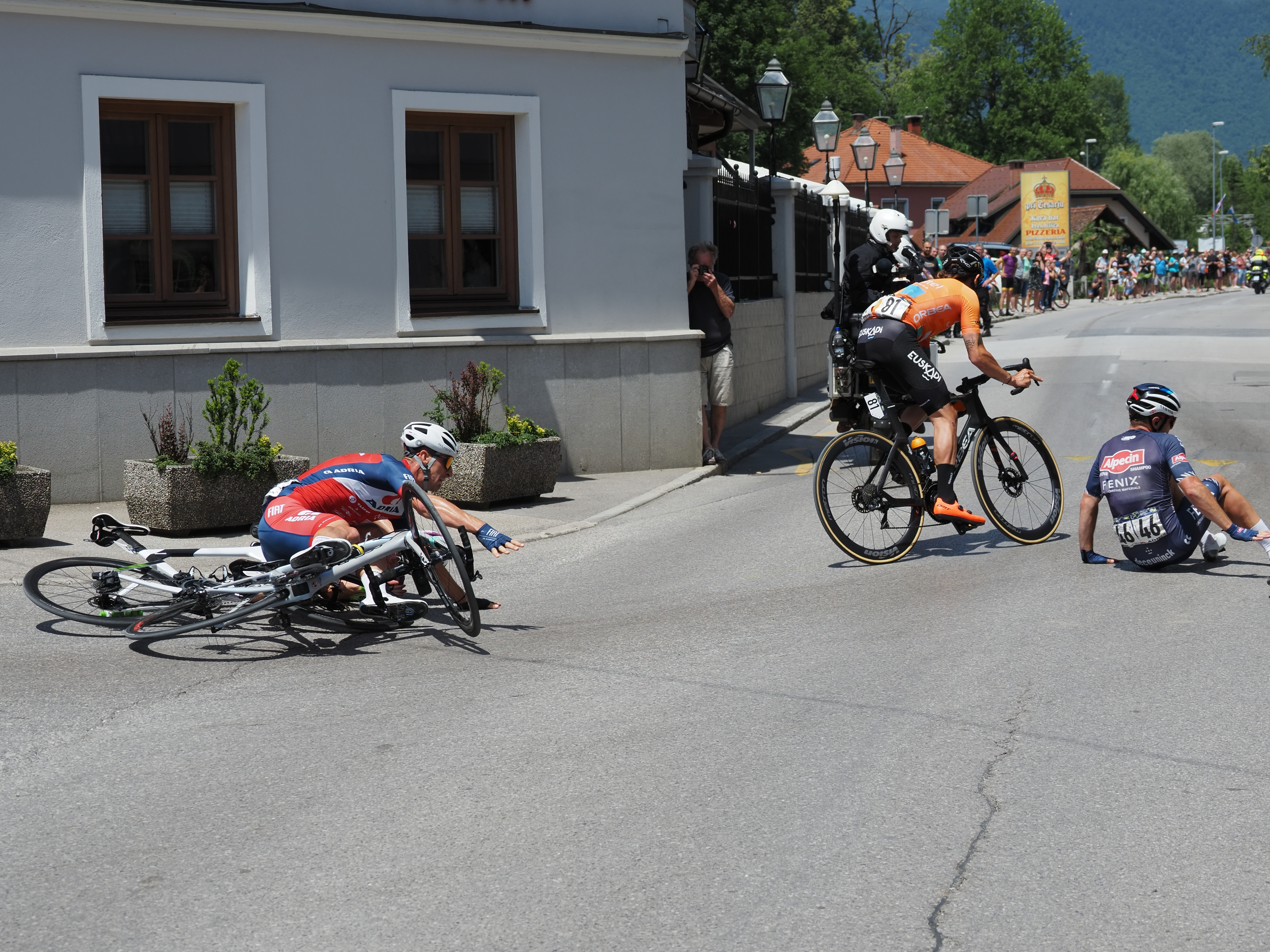
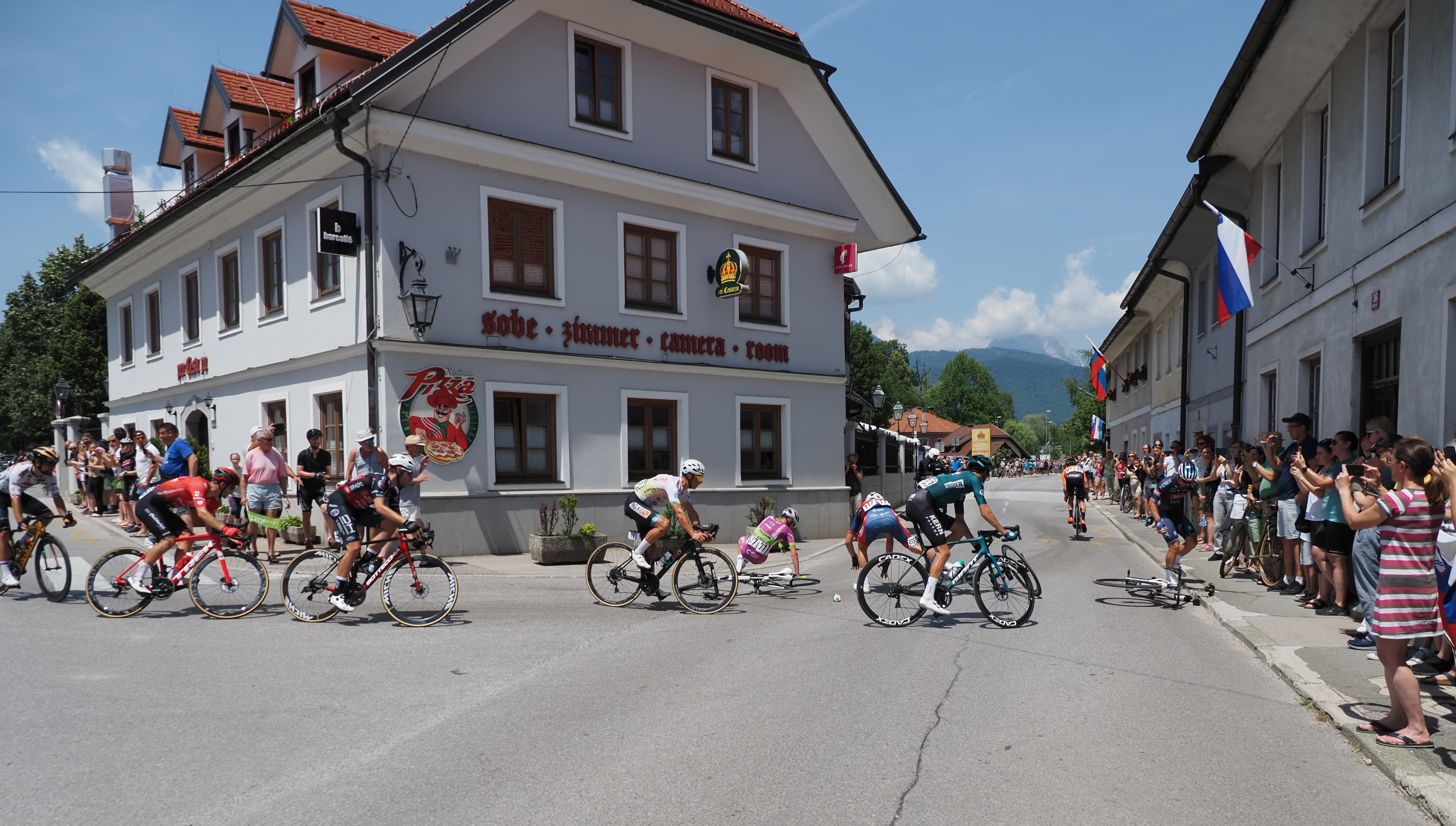
Breakaway group moment before and at the time of crash in a left turn at km 93 in Kamnik.

Rank	Rider	Team	Time
Official results
1	(Poland) Rafał Majka	UAE Team Emirates	3h 53' 52"
2	(Slovenia) Tadej Pogačar	UAE Team Emirates	+ 0"
3	(Spain) Fernando Barceló	Caja Rural–Seguros RGA	+ 22"
4	(Italy) Alex Tolio	Bardiani–CSF–Faizanè	+ 24"
5	(Italy) Vincenzo Albanese	Eolo–Kometa	+ 24"
6	(Czech Republic) Vojtěch Řepa	Equipo Kern Pharma	+ 28"
7	(United States) Sean Bennett	China Glory Continental Cycling Team	+ 33"
8	(Italy) Edward Ravasi	Eolo–Kometa	+ 43"
9	(Australia) Robert Stannard	Alpecin–Fenix	+ 52"
10	(Spain) Jon Agirre	Equipo Kern Pharma	+ 55"
General classification after the stage
1	(Slovenia) Tadej Pogačar	UAE Team Emirates	15h 35' 44"
2	(Poland) Rafał Majka	UAE Team Emirates	+ 3"
3	(Slovenia) Domen Novak	Team Bahrain Victorious	+ 1' 56"
4	(Italy) Vincenzo Albanese	Eolo–Kometa	+ 2' 07"
5	(Czech Republic) Vojtěch Řepa	Equipo Kern Pharma	+ 2' 17"
6	(Italy) Nicola Conci	Alpecin–Fenix	+ 2' 41"
7	(United Kingdom) Paul Double	MG.K Vis Colors for Peace VPM	+ 2' 56"
8	(Spain) Joel Nicolau	Caja Rural–Seguros RGA	+ 3' 04"
9	(Spain) Fernando Barceló	Caja Rural–Seguros RGA	+ 3' 16"
10	(Italy) Davide Gabburo	Bardiani–CSF–Faizanè	+ 3' 47"

=== Stage 5 ===
19 June 2022 – Vrhnika to Novo Mesto, 156.1 km (97.0 mi)

Stage 5

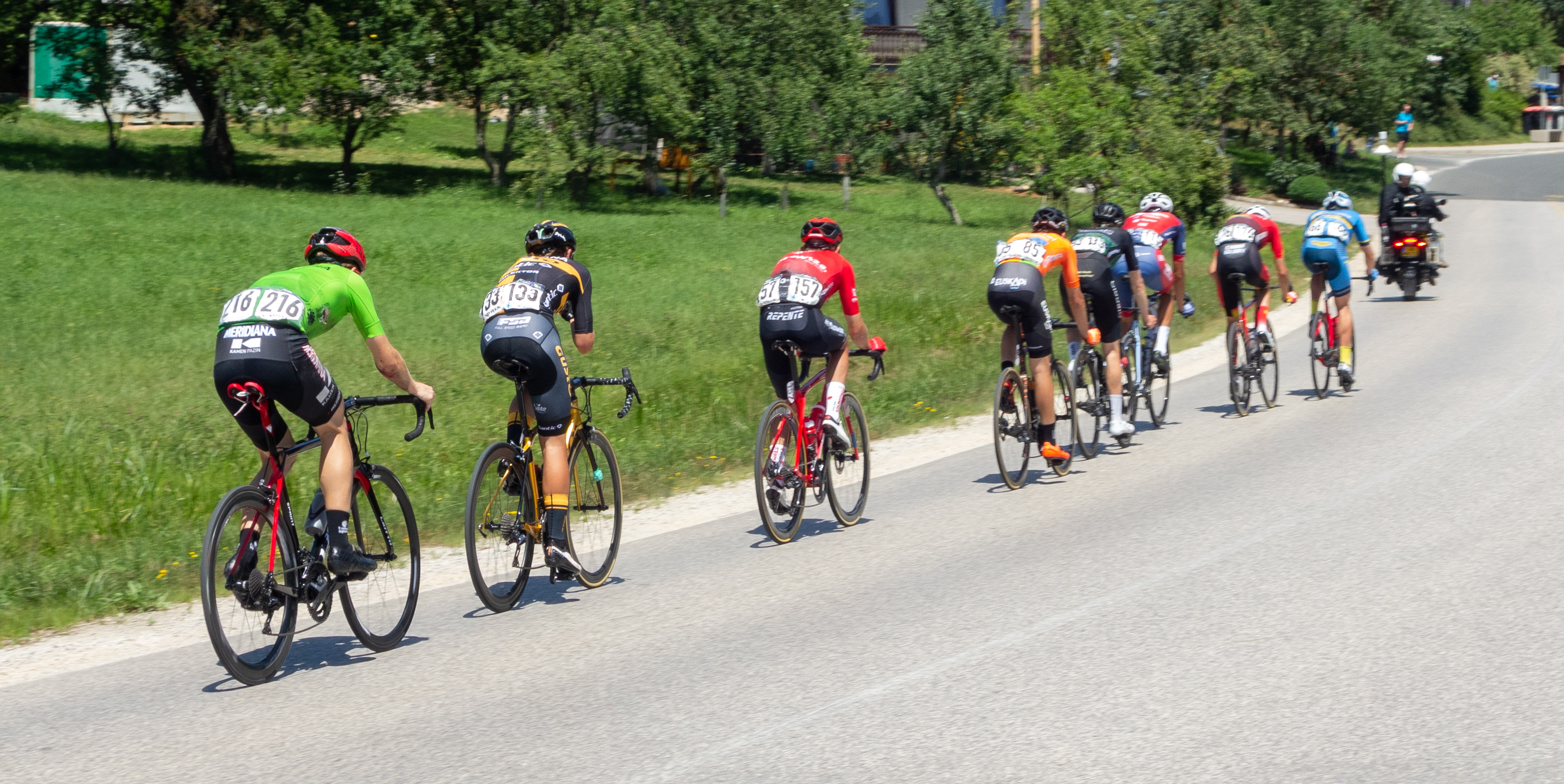
Breakaway group at km 83...

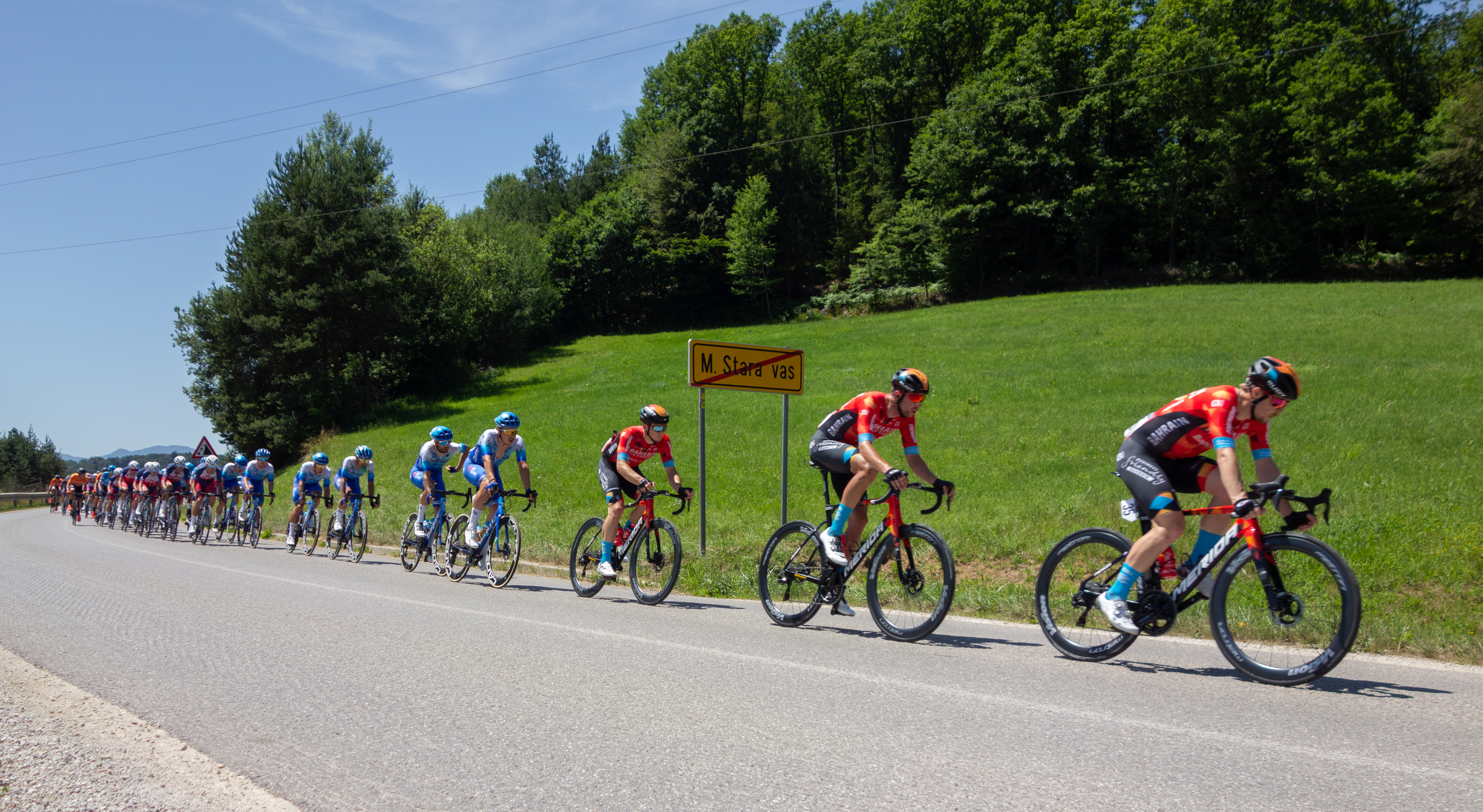
...followed by Peloton with 3:08 time gap

Rank	Rider	Team	Time
Official results
1	(Slovenia) Tadej Pogačar	UAE Team Emirates	3h 42' 35"
2	(Slovenia) Matej Mohorič	Team Bahrain Victorious	+ 0"
3	(Poland) Rafał Majka	UAE Team Emirates	+ 3"
4	(Slovenia) Luka Mezgec	Team BikeExchange–Jayco	+ 26"
5	(Italy) Fabio Felline	Astana Qazaqstan Team	+ 26"
6	(Italy) Nicola Conci	Alpecin–Fenix	+ 26"
7	(Italy) Filippo Fiorelli	Bardiani–CSF–Faizanè	+ 26"
8	(Italy) Vincenzo Albanese	Eolo–Kometa	+ 26"
9	(Spain) Antonio Jesús Soto	Euskaltel–Euskadi	+ 26"
10	(Spain) Fernando Barceló	Caja Rural–Seguros RGA	+ 26"
General classification after the stage
1	(Slovenia) Tadej Pogačar	UAE Team Emirates	19h 18' 09"
2	(Poland) Rafał Majka	UAE Team Emirates	+ 12"
3	(Slovenia) Domen Novak	Team Bahrain Victorious	+ 2' 32"
4	(Italy) Vincenzo Albanese	Eolo–Kometa	+ 2' 42"
5	(Czech Republic) Vojtěch Řepa	Equipo Kern Pharma	+ 3' 10"
6	(Italy) Nicola Conci	Alpecin–Fenix	+ 3' 17"
7	(United Kingdom) Paul Double	MG.K Vis Colors for Peace VPM	+ 3' 32"
8	(Spain) Joel Nicolau	Caja Rural–Seguros RGA	+ 3' 40"
9	(Spain) Fernando Barceló	Caja Rural–Seguros RGA	+ 3' 52"
10	(Italy) Davide Gabburo	Bardiani–CSF–Faizanè	+ 4' 23"

== Classification leadership ==
Classification leadership by stage
Stage	Winner	General classification	Points classification	Mountains classification	Young rider classification	Team classification
1	Rafał Majka	Rafał Majka	Rafał Majka	Rafał Majka	Alex Tolio	Team Bahrain Victorious
2	Dylan Groenewegen	Rafał Majka	Rafał Majka	Rafał Majka	Vojtěch Řepa	Team Bahrain Victorious
3	Tadej Pogačar	Tadej Pogačar	Rafał Majka	Rafał Majka	Vojtěch Řepa	Caja Rural–Seguros RGA
4	Rafał Majka	Tadej Pogačar	Rafał Majka	Rafał Majka	Vojtěch Řepa	Caja Rural–Seguros RGA
5	Tadej Pogačar	Tadej Pogačar	Tadej Pogačar	Rafał Majka	Vojtěch Řepa	Caja Rural–Seguros RGA
Final		Tadej Pogačar	Tadej Pogačar	Rafał Majka	Vojtěch Řepa	Caja Rural–Seguros RGA

== Final classification standings ==
Legend
Denotes the winner of the general classification	Denotes the winner of the mountains classification
Denotes the winner of the points classification	Denotes the winner of the young rider classification

=== General classification ===
Rank	Rider	Team	Time
1	(Slovenia) Tadej Pogačar	UAE Team Emirates	19h 18' 09"
2	(Poland) Rafał Majka	UAE Team Emirates	+ 12"
3	(Slovenia) Domen Novak	Team Bahrain Victorious	+ 2' 32"
4	(Italy) Vincenzo Albanese	Eolo–Kometa	+ 2' 42"
5	(Czech Republic) Vojtěch Řepa	Equipo Kern Pharma	+ 3' 10"
6	(Italy) Nicola Conci	Alpecin–Fenix	+ 3' 17"
7	(United Kingdom) Paul Double	MG.K Vis Colors for Peace VPM	+ 3' 32"
8	(Spain) Joel Nicolau	Caja Rural–Seguros RGA	+ 3' 40"
9	(Spain) Fernando Barceló	Caja Rural–Seguros RGA	+ 3' 52"
10	(Italy) Davide Gabburo	Bardiani–CSF–Faizanè	+ 4' 23"

=== Points classification ===
Rank	Rider	Team	Points
1	(Slovenia) Tadej Pogačar	UAE Team Emirates	86
2	(Poland) Rafał Majka	UAE Team Emirates	86
3	(Italy) Vincenzo Albanese	Eolo–Kometa	55
4	(Slovenia) Luka Mezgec	Team BikeExchange–Jayco	40
5	(Slovenia) Matej Mohorič	Team Bahrain Victorious	39
6	(Spain) Fernando Barceló	Caja Rural–Seguros RGA	38
7	(Italy) Nicola Conci	Alpecin–Fenix	36
8	(Slovenia) Domen Novak	Team Bahrain Victorious	32
9	(Italy) Fabio Felline	Astana Qazaqstan Team	28
10	(Netherlands) Dylan Groenewegen	Team BikeExchange–Jayco	25

=== Mountains classification ===
Rank	Rider	Team	Points
1	(Poland) Rafał Majka	UAE Team Emirates	30
2	(Slovenia) Tadej Pogačar	UAE Team Emirates	23
3	(Croatia) Viktor Potočki	Ljubljana Gusto Santic	12
4	(Italy) Samuele Zoccarato	Bardiani–CSF–Faizanè	10
5	(Slovenia) Domen Novak	Team Bahrain Victorious	9
6	(Spain) Fernando Barceló	Caja Rural–Seguros RGA	6
7	(Italy) Alex Tolio	Bardiani–CSF–Faizanè	4
8	(Slovenia) Matej Mohorič	Team Bahrain Victorious	4
9	(Poland) Tomasz Budziński	HRE Mazowsze Serce Polski	4
10	(France) Lucas De Rossi	China Glory Continental Cycling Team	3

=== Young rider classification ===
Rank	Rider	Team	Time
1	(Czech Republic) Vojtěch Řepa	Equipo Kern Pharma	19h 21' 19"
2	(Italy) Alex Tolio	Bardiani–CSF–Faizanè	+ 2' 28"
3	(Colombia) Santiago Umba	Drone Hopper–Androni Giocattoli	+ 20' 05"
4	(Slovenia) Gal Glivar	Adria Mobil	+ 25' 01"
5	(Australia) Dylan Hopkins	Ljubljana Gusto Santic	+ 26' 42"
6	(Spain) Carlos Canal	Euskaltel–Euskadi	+ 26' 55"
7	(Slovenia) Matevž Govekar	Team Bahrain Victorious	+ 27' 52"
8	(Italy) Alessandro Fancellu	Eolo–Kometa	+ 40' 42"
9	(Italy) Francesco Carollo	MG.K Vis Colors for Peace VPM	+ 41' 01"
10	(Switzerland) Alexandre Balmer	Team BikeExchange–Jayco	+ 41' 38"

=== Team classification ===
Rank	Team	Time
1	(Spain) Caja Rural–Seguros RGA	58h 05' 54"
2	(Italy) Eolo–Kometa	+ 3' 09"
3	(Spain) Equipo Kern Pharma	+ 10' 06"
4	(United Arab Emirates) UAE Team Emirates	+ 10' 09"
5	Team Bahrain Victorious	+ 10' 42"
6	(Italy) Bardiani–CSF–Faizanè	+ 12' 57"
7	(Belgium) Alpecin–Fenix	+ 17' 39"
8	(Italy) Drone Hopper–Androni Giocattoli	+ 42' 39"
9	(Spain) Euskaltel–Euskadi	+ 48' 20"
10	(Australia) Team BikeExchange–Jayco	+ 53' 04"

== UCI point ranking ==
Position	1.	2.	3.	4.	5.	6.	7.	8.	9.	10.	11.	12.	13.	14.	15.	16.-30.	31.-40.
General classification	200	150	125	100	85	70	60	50	40	35	30	25	20	15	10	5	3
Per stage	20	10	5
Leader	5

Classification
Position	Rider	Team	General	Stage	Leader	Total
1.	(Slovenia) Tadej Pogačar	UAE Team Emirates	200	55	10	265
2.	(Poland) Rafał Majka	UAE Team Emirates	150	55	10	215
3.	(Slovenia) Domen Novak	Team Bahrain Victorious	125	10	-	135
4.	(Italy) Vincenzo Albanese	Eolo–Kometa	100	-	-	100
5.	(Czech Republic) Vojtěch Řepa	Equipo Kern Pharma	85	-	-	85
6.	(Italy) Nicola Conci	Alpecin–Fenix	70	5	-	75
7.	(United Kingdom) Paul Double	MG.K Vis Colors for Peace VPM	60	-	-	60
8.	(Spain) Joel Nicolau	Caja Rural–Seguros RGA	50	-	-	50
9.	(Spain) Fernando Barceló	Caja Rural–Seguros RGA	40	5	-	45
10.	(Italy) Davide Gabburo	Bardiani–CSF–Faizanè	35	-	-	35
