= 2022 Team BikeExchange–Jayco (men's team) season =

Team BikeExchange–Jayco
- 2022 season
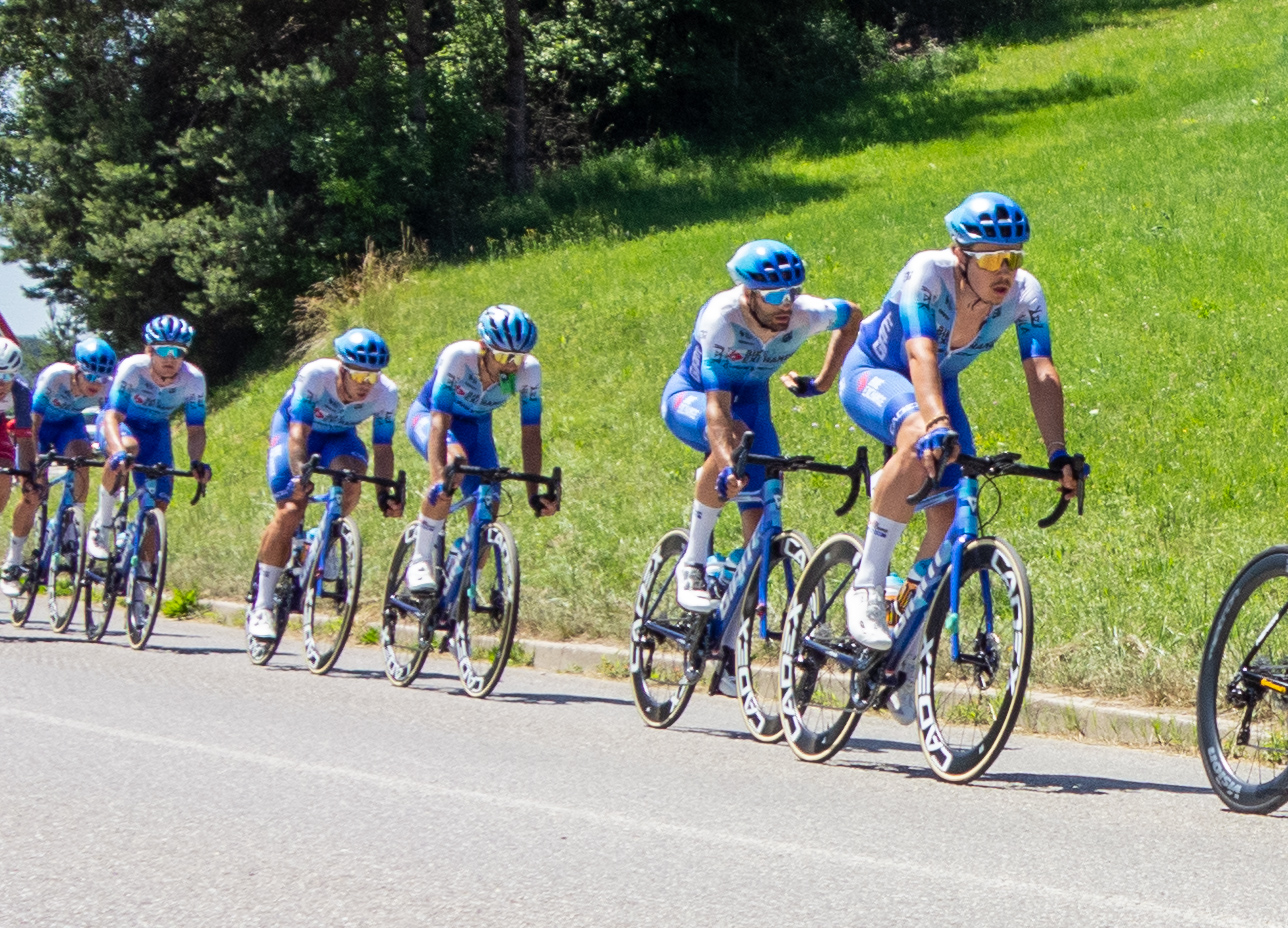
- Team BikeExchange–Jayco during Stage 5 on 2022 Tour of Slovenia
- UCI code: BEX
- Status: UCI WorldTeam
- Owner: Gerry Ryan
- Manager: Brent Copeland (RSA)
- Main sponsor(s): BikeExchange; Jayco
- Based: Australia
- Bicycles: Giant
- Groupset: Shimano

Season victories
- One-day races: 2
- Stage race overall: 1
- Stage race stages: 18
- Most wins: Dylan Groenewegen (NED) & Simon Yates (GBR) (7)
- Best ranked rider: Michael Matthews (AUS) (11th)
- Jersey

The 2022 season for the Team BikeExchange–Jayco team is the team's 11th season in existence, all of which have been as a UCI WorldTeam.

Australian cycling retailer BikeExchange continues as a title sponsor for a second consecutive season and third season overall, with recreational vehicle manufacturer Jayco, another brand owned by team owner Gerry Ryan, joining as a new co-title sponsor. Additionally, the team changed bicycle suppliers for the second consecutive season, dropping Bianchi after one season for Giant bicycles with Shimano drivetrain, Cadex wheels and Giordana clothing.

== Team roster ==
As of 13 January 2022.

Rider	Date of birth
Alexandre Balmer (SUI)	4 May 2000 (aged 21)
Jack Bauer (NZL)	7 April 1985 (aged 36)
Sam Bewley (NZL)	22 July 1987 (aged 34)
Kevin Colleoni (ITA)	11 November 1999 (aged 22)
Lawson Craddock (USA)	20 February 1992 (aged 29)
Luke Durbridge (AUS)	9 April 1991 (aged 30)
Alex Edmondson (AUS)	22 December 1993 (aged 28)
Tsgabu Grmay (ETH)	25 August 1991 (aged 30)
Dylan Groenewegen (NED)	21 June 1993 (aged 28)
Kaden Groves (AUS)	23 December 1998 (aged 23)
Lucas Hamilton (AUS)	12 February 1996 (aged 25)
Michael Hepburn (AUS)	17 August 1991 (aged 30)
Damien Howson (AUS)	13 August 1992 (aged 29)
Amund Grøndahl Jansen (NOR)	11 February 1994 (aged 27)
Christopher Juul-Jensen (DEN)	6 July 1989 (aged 32)

Rider	Date of birth
Tanel Kangert (EST)	11 March 1987 (aged 34)
Alexander Konychev (ITA)	25 July 1998 (aged 23)
Jan Maas (NED)	19 February 1996 (aged 25)
Michael Matthews (AUS)	26 September 1990 (aged 31)
Cameron Meyer (AUS)	11 January 1988 (aged 33)
Luka Mezgec (SLO)	27 June 1988 (aged 33)
Kelland O'Brien (AUS)	22 May 1998 (aged 23)
Jesús David Peña (COL)	8 May 2000 (aged 21)
Nick Schultz (AUS)	13 September 1994 (aged 27)
Callum Scotson (AUS)	10 August 1996 (aged 25)
Dion Smith (NZL)	3 March 1993 (aged 28)
Matteo Sobrero (ITA)	14 May 1997 (aged 24)
Campbell Stewart (NZL)	12 May 1998 (aged 23)
Simon Yates (GBR)	7 August 1992 (aged 29)

Riders who joined the team for the 2022 season

Rider	2021 team
Alexandre Balmer	neo-pro (Équipe Continentale Groupama–FDJ)
Lawson Craddock	EF Education–Nippo
Dylan Groenewegen	Team Jumbo–Visma
Jan Maas	neo-pro (Leopard Pro Cycling)
Kelland O'Brien	neo-pro (St Kilda Cycling Club and track cycling)
Jesús David Peña	neo-pro (Colombia Tierra de Atletas–GW Bicicletas)
Matteo Sobrero	Astana–Premier Tech
Campbell Stewart	neo-pro (Black Spoke Pro Cycling)
Elmar Reinders	mid-season transfer in August 2022 (Riwal Cycling Team)

Riders who left the team during or after the 2021 season

Rider	2022 team
Brent Bookwalter	Retired
Esteban Chaves	EF Education–EasyPost
Mikel Nieve	Caja Rural–Seguros RGA
Barnabás Peák	Intermarché–Wanty–Gobert Matériaux
Robert Stannard	Alpecin–Fenix
Andrey Zeits	Astana Qazaqstan Team

== Season victories ==
Date	Race	Competition	Rider	Country	Location	Ref.
3 February	Saudi Tour, Stage 3	UCI Asia Tour	Dylan Groenewegen (NED)	Saudi Arabia	Al Ula Old Town	
5 February	Saudi Tour, Stage 5	UCI Asia Tour	Dylan Groenewegen (NED)	Saudi Arabia	Al Ula Old Town	
5 February	Saudi Tour, Points classification	UCI Asia Tour	Dylan Groenewegen (NED)	Saudi Arabia		
13 March	Paris–Nice, Stage 8	UCI World Tour	Simon Yates (GBR)	France	Nice	
21 March	Volta a Catalunya, Stage 1	UCI World Tour	Michael Matthews (AUS)	Spain	Sant Feliu de Guíxols	
22 March	Volta a Catalunya, Stage 2	UCI World Tour	Kaden Groves (AUS)	France	Perpignan	
27 March	Volta a Catalunya, Points classification	UCI World Tour	Kaden Groves (AUS)	Spain		
11 April	Presidential Tour of Turkey, Stage 2	UCI ProSeries	Kaden Groves (AUS)	Turkey	Alaçatı	
29 April	Vuelta Asturias, Stage 1	UCI Europe Tour	Simon Yates (GBR)	Spain	Pola de Lena	
1 May	Vuelta Asturias, Stage 3	UCI Europe Tour	Simon Yates (GBR)	Spain	Oviedo	
1 May	Vuelta Asturias, Points classification	UCI Europe Tour	Simon Yates (GBR)	Spain		
7 May	Giro d'Italia, Stage 2 (ITT)	UCI World Tour	Simon Yates (GBR)	Hungary	Budapest	
14 May	Tour de Hongrie, Stage 4	UCI Europe Tour	Dylan Groenewegen (NED)	Hungary	Kazincbarcika	
21 May	Veenendaal–Veenendaal Classic	UCI Europe Tour	Dylan Groenewegen (NED)	Netherlands	Veenendaal	
21 May	Giro d'Italia, Stage 14	UCI World Tour	Simon Yates (GBR)	Italy	Turin	
29 May	Giro d'Italia, Stage 21 (ITT)	UCI World Tour	Matteo Sobrero (ITA)	Italy	Verona	
16 June	Tour of Slovenia, Stage 2	UCI ProSeries	Dylan Groenewegen (NED)	Slovenia	Rogaška Slatina	
3 July	Tour de France, Stage 3	UCI World Tour	Dylan Groenewegen (NED)	Denmark	Sønderborg	
16 July	Tour de France, Stage 14	UCI World Tour	Michael Matthews (AUS)	France	Mende	
25 July	Prueba Villafranca de Ordizia	UCI Europe Tour	Simon Yates (GBR)	Spain	Ordizia	
28 July	Vuelta a Castilla y Leon, Stage 2	UCI Europe Tour	Simon Yates (GBR)	Spain	Guijuelo	
28 July	Vuelta a Castilla y Leon, Overall	UCI Europe Tour	Simon Yates (GBR)	Spain		
12 August	Arctic Race of Norway, Stage 2	UCI ProSeries	Dylan Groenewegen (NED)	Norway	Brønnøysund	
31 August	Vuelta a España, Stage 11	UCI World Tour	Kaden Groves (AUS)	Spain	Cabo de Gata	

== National, Continental, and World Champions ==
Date	Discipline	Jersey	Rider	Country	Location	Ref.
23 June	United States National Time Trial Championships		Lawson Craddock (USA)	United States	Knoxville	
