= 2022 Team Bahrain Victorious season =

Team Bahrain Victorious
- 2022 season
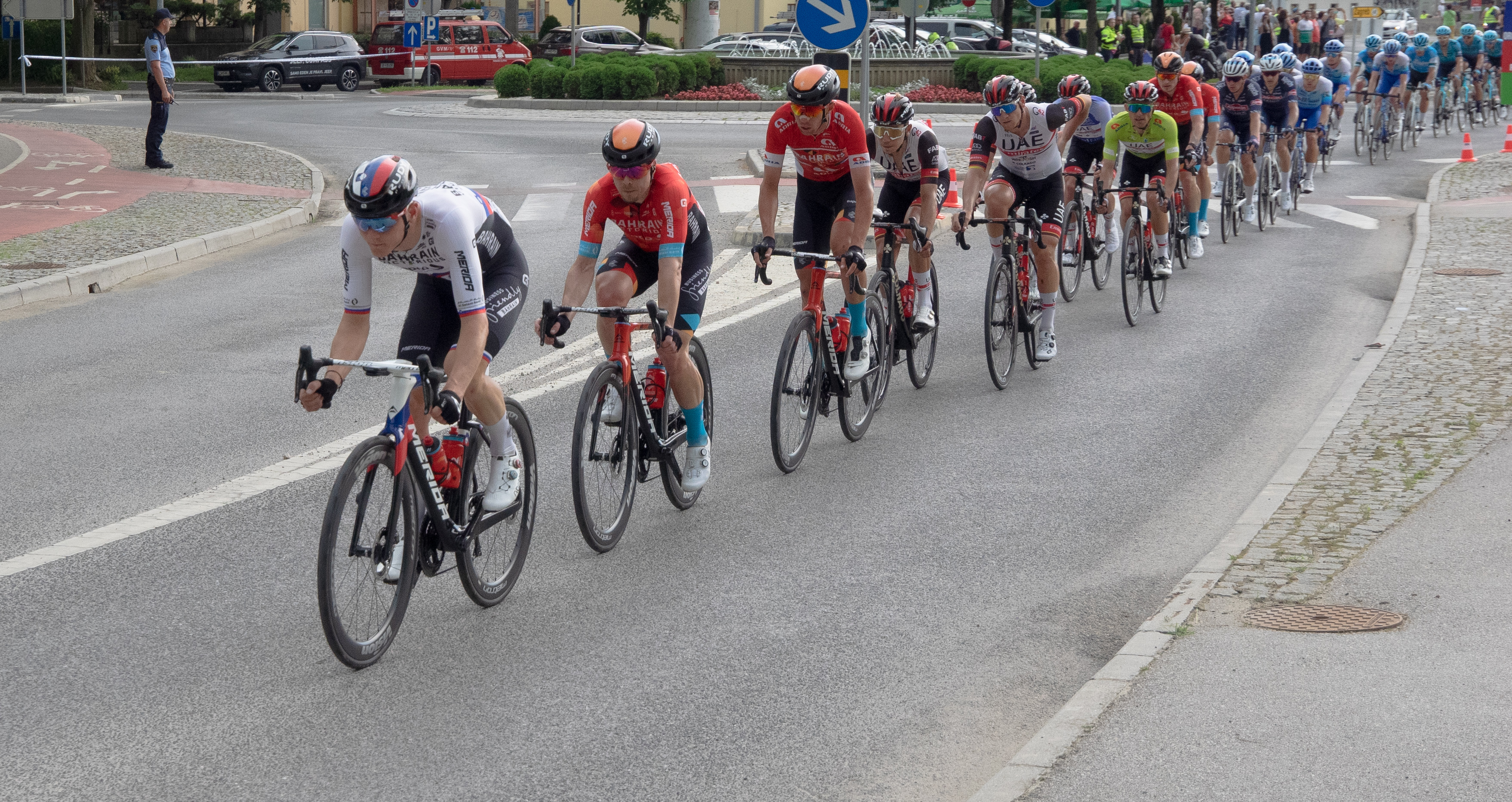
- Team Bahrain Victorious pulling the leading group (2022 Tour of Slovenia)
- UCI code: TBV
- Status: UCI WorldTeam
- Owner: Nasser bin Hamad Al Khalifa
- Manager: Milan Eržen (SLO)
- Based: Bahrain
- Bicycles: Merida
- Groupset: Shimano

Season victories
- One-day races: 2
- Stage race overall: 1
- Stage race stages: 10
- National Championships: 1
- Jersey

The 2022 season for Team Bahrain Victorious is the sixth season in the team's existence, all of which have been as a UCI WorldTeam, and the second under the current name. They use Merida bicycles, Shimano drivetrain, Vision wheels and Alé clothing.

== Team roster ==
As of 1 June 2022.

Rider	Date of birth
Yukiya Arashiro (JPN)	22 September 1984 (aged 37)
Phil Bauhaus (GER)	8 July 1994 (aged 27)
Pello Bilbao (ESP)	25 February 1990 (aged 31)
Santiago Buitrago (COL)	26 September 1999 (aged 22)
Damiano Caruso (ITA)	12 October 1987 (aged 34)
Sonny Colbrelli (ITA)	17 May 1990 (aged 31)
Feng Chun-kai (TWN)	2 November 1988 (aged 33)
Matevž Govekar (Note: On 1 June, Govekar joined from Tirol KTM Cycling Team.) (SLO)	17 April 2000 (aged 21)
Kamil Gradek (POL)	17 September 1990 (aged 31)
Jack Haig (AUS)	6 September 1993 (aged 28)
Heinrich Haussler (AUS)	25 February 1984 (aged 37)
Mikel Landa (ESP)	13 December 1989 (aged 32)
Filip Maciejuk (POL)	3 September 1999 (aged 22)
Ahmed Madan (BHR)	25 August 2000 (aged 21)
Gino Mäder (SUI)	4 January 1997 (aged 24)

Rider	Date of birth
Jonathan Milan (ITA)	1 October 2000 (aged 21)
Matej Mohorič (SLO)	19 October 1994 (aged 27)
Domen Novak (SLO)	12 July 1995 (aged 26)
Alejandro Osorio (Note: Osorio was let go by the team on 31 March after reportedly breaching COVID-19 bubble restrictions multiple times.) (COL)	28 May 1998 (aged 23)
Hermann Pernsteiner (AUT)	7 August 1990 (aged 31)
Wout Poels (NED)	1 October 1987 (aged 34)
Johan Price-Pejtersen (DEN)	26 May 1999 (aged 22)
Luis León Sánchez (ESP)	24 November 1983 (aged 38)
Jasha Sütterlin (GER)	4 November 1992 (aged 29)
Dylan Teuns (BEL)	1 March 1992 (aged 29)
Jan Tratnik (SLO)	23 February 1990 (aged 31)
Stephen Williams (GBR)	9 June 1996 (aged 25)
Alfred Wright (GBR)	13 June 1999 (aged 22)
Edoardo Zambanini (ITA)	21 April 2001 (aged 20)

Riders who joined the team for the 2022 season

Rider	2021 team
Matevž Govekar	neo-pro (Tirol KTM Cycling Team)
Kamil Gradek	Vini Zabù
Filip Maciejuk	neo-pro (Leopard Pro Cycling)
Alejandro Osorio	Caja Rural–Seguros RGA
Johan Price-Pejtersen	Uno-X Pro Cycling Team
Luis León Sánchez	Astana–Premier Tech
Jasha Sütterlin	Team DSM
Edoardo Zambanini	neo-pro (Zalf Euromobil Fior)

Riders who left the team during or after the 2021 season

Rider	2022 team
Scott Davies	Retired
Eros Capecchi	Retired
Marco Haller	Bora–Hansgrohe
Kevin Inkelaar	Leopard Pro Cycling
Mark Padun	EF Education–EasyPost
Marcel Sieberg	Retired
Rafael Valls	Retired

== Season victories ==
Date	Race	Competition	Rider	Country	Location	Ref.
2 February	Saudi Tour, Stage 2	UCI Asia Tour	Santiago Buitrago (COL)	Saudi Arabia	Abu Rakah	
19 February	Vuelta a Andalucía, Stage 4	UCI ProSeries	Wout Poels (NED)	Spain	Baza	
20 February	Vuelta a Andalucía, Overall	UCI ProSeries	Wout Poels (NED)	Spain		
13 March	Tirreno–Adriatico, Stage 7	UCI World Tour	Phil Bauhaus (GER)	Italy	San Benedetto del Tronto	
13 March	Tirreno–Adriatico, Team classification	UCI World Tour	(Note: The riders in the squad were Phil Bauhaus, Pello Bilbao, Damiano Caruso, Heinrich Haussler, Mikel Landa, Jasha Sütterlin, and Jan Tratnik.)	Italy		
19 March	Milan–San Remo	UCI World Tour	Matej Mohorič (SLO)	Italy	Sanremo	
27 March	Volta a Catalunya, Team classification	UCI World Tour	(Note: The riders in the squad were Phil Bauhaus, Santiago Buitrago, Sonny Colbrelli, Jack Haig, Hermann Pernsteiner, Wout Poels, and Dylan Teuns.)	Spain		
6 April	Tour of the Basque Country, Stage 3	UCI World Tour	Pello Bilbao (ESP)	Spain	Amurrio	
19 April	Tour of the Alps, Stage 2	UCI ProSeries	Pello Bilbao (ESP)	Italy	Lana	
20 April	La Flèche Wallonne	UCI World Tour	Dylan Teuns (BEL)	Belgium	Mur de Huy	
27 April	Tour de Romandie, Stage 1	UCI World Tour	Dylan Teuns (BEL)	Switzerland	Romont	
25 May	Giro d'Italia, Stage 17	UCI World Tour	Santiago Buitrago (COL)	Italy	Lavarone	
29 May	Giro d'Italia, Team classification	UCI World Tour	(Note: The riders in the squad were Phil Bauhaus, Pello Bilbao, Santiago Buitrago, Mikel Landa, Domen Novak, Wout Poels, Jasha Sütterlin, and Jan Tratnik.)	Italy		
2 August	Vuelta A Burgos, Stage 1	UCI Europe Tour	Santiago Buitrago (COL)	Spain	Burgos	
3 August	Tour de Pologne, Stage 5	UCI World Tour	Phil Bauhaus (GER)	Poland	Rzeszów	
5 August	Vuelta A Burgos, Stage 4	UCI Europe Tour	Matevž Govekar (SLO)	Spain	Ciudad Romana de Clunia	

== National, Continental, and World Champions ==
Date	Discipline	Jersey	Rider	Country	Location	Ref.
23 June	Slovenian National Time Trial Championships		Jan Tratnik (SLO)	Slovenia	Dolenje Karteljevo	
