= 2022 Lotto–Soudal season =

Lotto–Soudal
- 2022 season
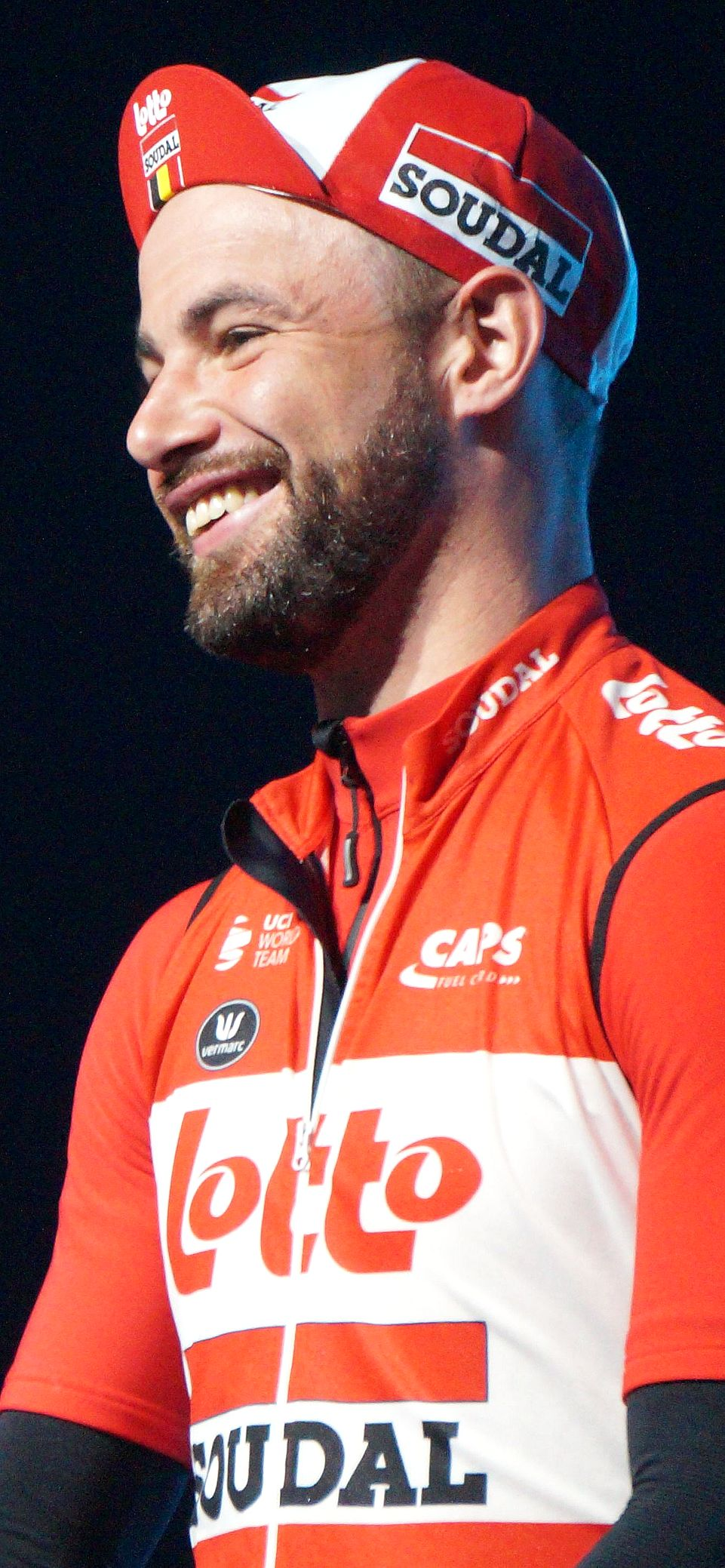
- Victor Campenaerts at Omloop Het Nieuwsblad
- UCI code: LTS
- Status: UCI WorldTeam
- Manager: John Lelangue (BEL)
- Main sponsor(s): Lotto; Soudal
- Based: Belgium
- Bicycles: Ridley
- Groupset: Shimano

Season victories
- One-day races: 6
- Stage race overall: 2
- Stage race stages: 9
- Jersey

The 2022 season for Lotto–Soudal is the 38th season in the team's existence and the eighth season under the current name. The team has been a UCI WorldTeam since 2005, when the tier was first established. They use Ridley bicycles, Shimano drivetrain, DT Swiss wheels and Vermarc clothing.

== Team roster ==
As of 6 May 2022.

Rider	Date of birth
Carlos Barbero (Note: Barbero and Janse van Rensburg joined the team on 1 May, both having been without a team since the end of the 2021 season.) (ESP)	29 April 1991 (aged 30)
Cédric Beullens (BEL)	27 January 1997 (aged 24)
Victor Campenaerts (BEL)	28 October 1991 (aged 30)
Filippo Conca (ITA)	22 September 1998 (aged 23)
Steff Cras (BEL)	13 February 1996 (aged 25)
Jasper De Buyst (BEL)	24 November 1993 (aged 28)
Thomas De Gendt (BEL)	6 November 1986 (aged 35)
Arnaud De Lie (BEL)	16 March 2002 (aged 19)
Jarrad Drizners (AUS)	31 May 1999 (aged 22)
Caleb Ewan (AUS)	11 July 1994 (aged 27)
Frederik Frison (BEL)	28 July 1992 (aged 29)
Philippe Gilbert (BEL)	5 July 1982 (aged 39)
Sébastien Grignard (BEL)	29 April 1999 (aged 22)
Matthew Holmes (GBR)	8 December 1993 (aged 28)
Reinardt Janse van Rensburg (RSA)	3 February 1989 (aged 32)

Rider	Date of birth
Roger Kluge (GER)	5 February 1986 (aged 35)
Andreas Kron (DEN)	1 June 1998 (aged 23)
Kamil Małecki (POL)	2 January 1996 (aged 25)
Sylvain Moniquet (BEL)	14 January 1998 (aged 23)
Michael Schwarzmann (GER)	7 January 1991 (aged 30)
Rüdiger Selig (GER)	19 February 1989 (aged 32)
Harry Sweeny (AUS)	9 July 1998 (aged 23)
Maxim Van Gils (BEL)	25 November 1999 (aged 22)
Brent Van Moer (BEL)	12 January 1998 (aged 23)
Harm Vanhoucke (BEL)	17 June 1997 (aged 24)
Florian Vermeersch (BEL)	12 April 1999 (aged 22)
Viktor Verschaeve (BEL)	3 August 1998 (aged 23)
Xandres Vervloesem (BEL)	13 May 2000 (aged 21)
Tim Wellens (BEL)	10 May 1991 (aged 30)

Riders who joined the team for the 2022 season

Rider	2021 team
Carlos Barbero	Team Qhubeka NextHash
Cédric Beullens	Sport Vlaanderen–Baloise
Victor Campenaerts	Team Qhubeka NextHash
Arnaud De Lie	neo-pro (Lotto–Soudal U23)
Jarrad Drizners	neo-pro (Hagens Berman Axeon)
Reinardt Janse van Rensburg	Team Qhubeka NextHash
Michael Schwarzmann	Bora–Hansgrohe
Rüdiger Selig	Bora–Hansgrohe

Riders who left the team during or after the 2021 season

Rider	2022 team
John Degenkolb	Team DSM
Kobe Goossens	Intermarché–Wanty–Gobert Matériaux
Tomasz Marczyński	Retired
Stefano Oldani	Alpecin–Fenix
Gerben Thijssen	Intermarché–Wanty–Gobert Matériaux
Tosh Van der Sande	Team Jumbo–Visma

== Season victories ==
Date	Race	Competition	Rider	Country	Location	Ref.
28 January	Trofeo Serra de Tramuntana	UCI Europe Tour	Tim Wellens (BEL)	Spain	Lloseta	
30 January	Trofeo Playa de Palma	UCI Europe Tour	Arnaud De Lie (BEL)	Spain	Palma	
1 February	Saudi Tour, Stage 1	UCI Asia Tour	Caleb Ewan (AUS)	Saudi Arabia	Winter Park	
4 February	Saudi Tour, Stage 4	UCI Asia Tour	Maxim Van Gils (BEL)	Saudi Arabia	Skyviews of Harrat Uwayrid	
5 February	Saudi Tour, Overall	UCI Asia Tour	Maxim Van Gils (BEL)	Saudi Arabia		
5 February	Saudi Tour, Young rider classification	UCI Asia Tour	Maxim Van Gils (BEL)	Saudi Arabia		
18 February	Tour des Alpes-Maritimes et du Var, Stage 1	UCI Europe Tour	Caleb Ewan (AUS)	France	La Seyne-sur-Mer	
19 February	Tour des Alpes-Maritimes et du Var, Stage 2	UCI Europe Tour	Tim Wellens (BEL)	France	La Turbie	
20 February	Tour des Alpes-Maritimes et du Var, Young rider classification	UCI Europe Tour	Andreas Kron (DEN)	France		
6 March	Grote Prijs Jean-Pierre Monseré	UCI Europe Tour	Arnaud De Lie (BEL)	Belgium	Roeselare	
9 March	Tirreno–Adriatico, Stage 3	UCI World Tour	Caleb Ewan (AUS)	Italy	Terni	
2 April	Volta Limburg Classic	UCI Europe Tour	Arnaud De Lie (BEL)	Belgium	Eijsden	
10 April	Presidential Tour of Turkey, Stage 1	UCI ProSeries	Caleb Ewan (AUS)	Turkey	Kuşadası	
15 April	Presidential Tour of Turkey, Stage 6	UCI ProSeries	Caleb Ewan (AUS)	Turkey	Eceabat (57. Alay Şehitliği)	
5 May	Four Days of Dunkirk, Stage 3	UCI ProSeries	Philippe Gilbert (BEL)	France	Mont-Saint-Éloi	
8 May	Four Days of Dunkirk, Overall	UCI ProSeries	Philippe Gilbert (BEL)	France		
8 May	Four Days of Dunkirk, Team classification	UCI ProSeries	(Note: The riders in the squad were Carlos Barbero, Cédric Beullens, Arnaud de Lie, Philippe Gilbert, Reinardt Janse van Rensburg, Andreas Kron, and Brent Van Moer.)	France		
14 May	Giro d'Italia, Stage 8	UCI World Tour	Thomas De Gendt (BEL)	Italy	Naples	
22 May	Antwerp Port Epic	UCI Europe Tour	Florian Vermeersch (BEL)	Belgium	Antwerp	
29 May	Grote Prijs Marcel Kint	UCI Europe Tour	Arnaud De Lie (BEL)	Belgium	Zwevegem	

== National, Continental, and World Champions ==
Date	Discipline	Jersey	Rider	Country	Location	Ref.
