= Benjamin Declercq =

Belgian cyclist

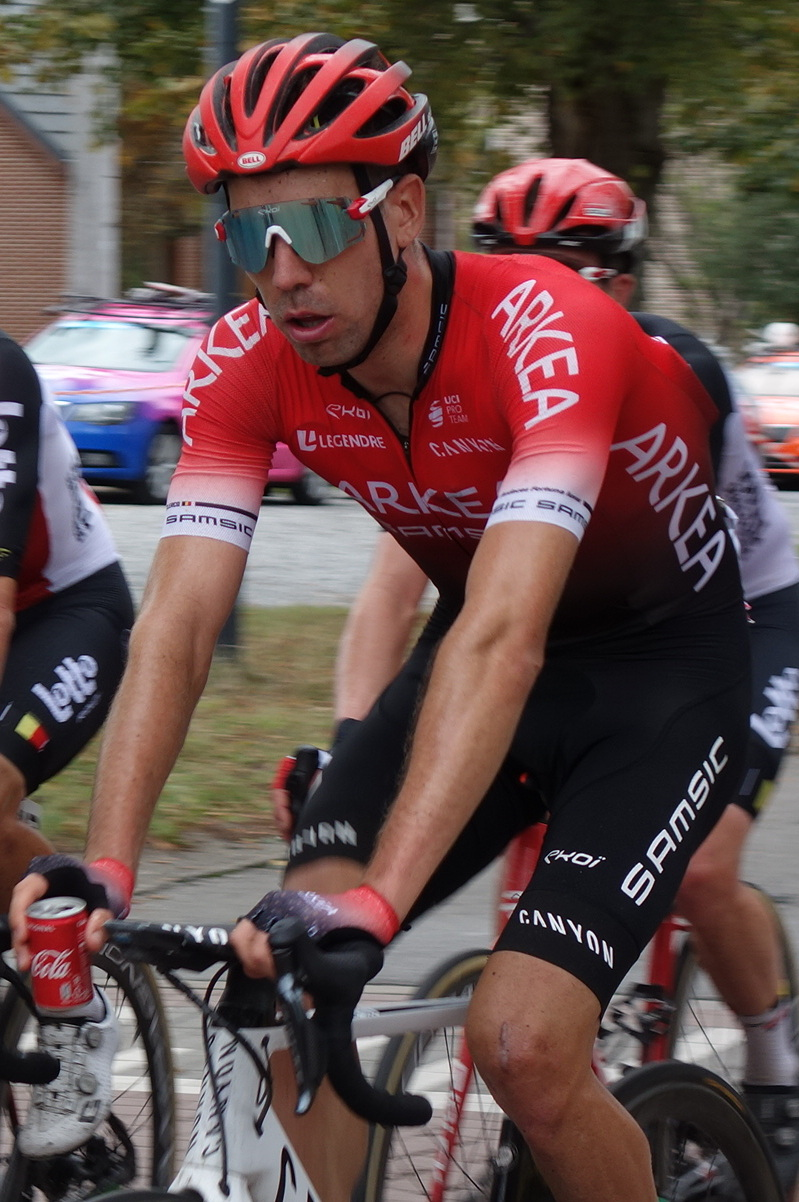
- Declercq at the 2020 La Flèche Wallonne

Personal information
- Full name: Benjamin Declercq
- Born: 4 February 1994 (age 32) Kortrijk, Belgium
- Height: 1.82 m (6 ft 0 in)
- Weight: 67 kg (148 lb)

Cycling career
- Sport: Cycling
- Current team: Retired
- Discipline: Road
- Role: Rider

Amateur teams
- 2006–2012: DJ–Matic Kortrijk
- 2013–2016: EFC–Omega Pharma–Quick-Step

Professional teams
- 2017–2019: Sport Vlaanderen–Baloise
- 2020–2022: Arkéa–Samsic

Benjamin Declercq (born 4 February 1994 in Kortrijk) is a Belgian former cyclist, who competed as a professional from 2017 to 2022. He is the brother of Tim Declercq, a professional cyclist on the Lidl–Trek team.

== Major results ==
2014
4th Paris–Tours Espoirs
10th Circuit de Wallonie
2016
2nd Eschborn-Frankfurt City Loop U23
7th Grand Prix Criquielion
2017
9th Dwars door het Hageland
2018
3rd Grand Prix Pino Cerami
7th Famenne Ardenne Classic
2019
2nd Grand Prix Pino Cerami
6th Druivenkoers Overijse
10th Schaal Sels
2020
6th Dwars door het Hageland
7th Overall Tour du Limousin
2022
9th Overall Saudi Tour
