= Tim Declercq =

Belgian bicycle racer

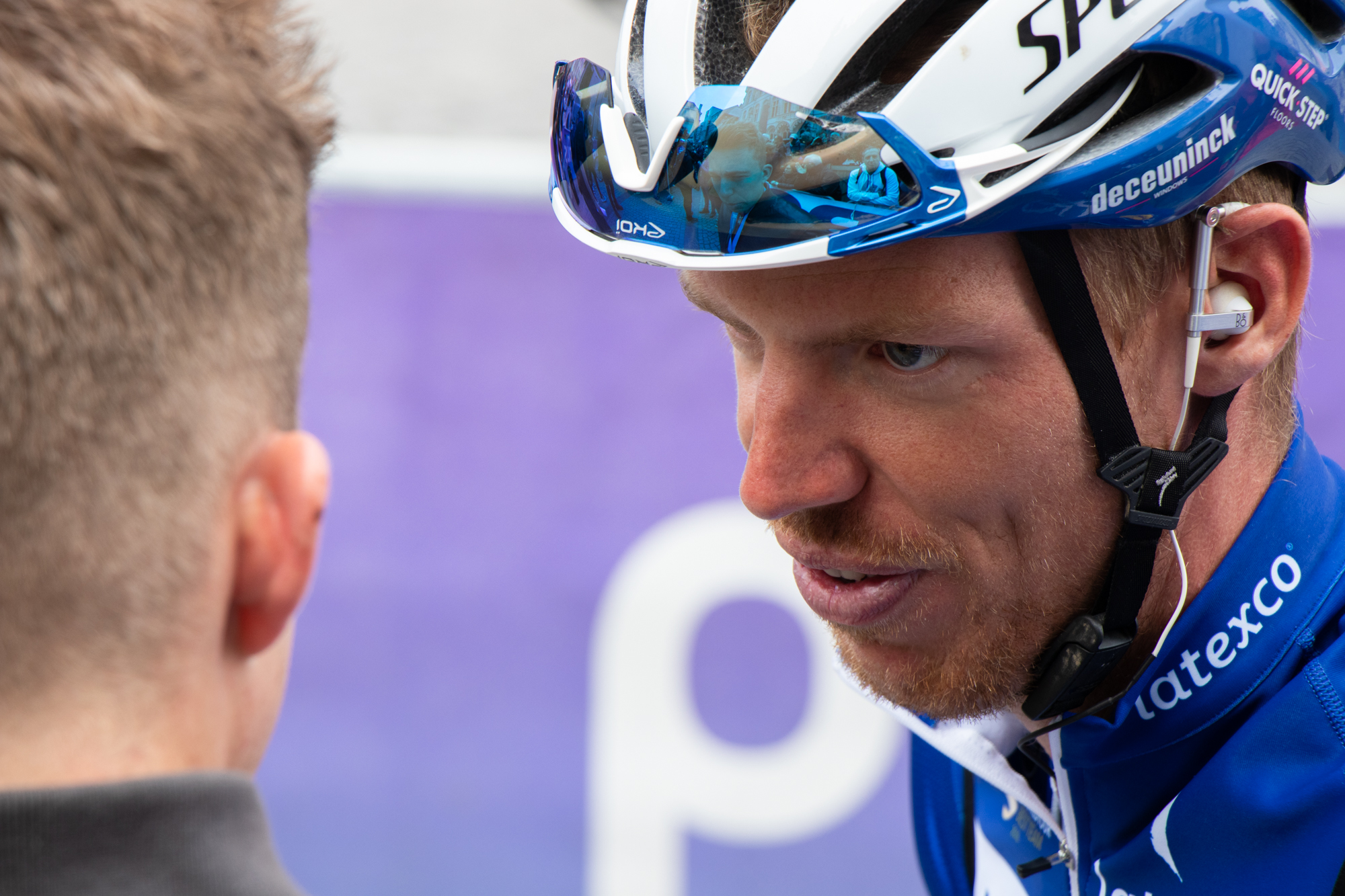
- Declercq in 2019.

Personal information
- Full name: Tim Declercq
- Nickname: El Tractor
- Born: 21 March 1989 (age 37) Leuven, Belgium
- Height: 1.90 m (6 ft 3 in)
- Weight: 78 kg (172 lb)

Cycling career
- Sport: Cycling
- Current team: Lidl–Trek
- Discipline: Road
- Role: Rider (retired)
- Rider type: Domestique

Amateur teams
- 2001–2003: De Kluisbergspurters
- 2004–2005: Den Tip Vorselaar
- 2006–2007: Avia Waasland
- 2008–2011: WC Soenens–Germond
- 2010: Jong Vlaanderen–Bauknecht (stagiaire)

Professional teams
- 2012–2016: Topsport Vlaanderen–Mercator
- 2017–2023: Quick-Step Floors
- 2024–2025: Lidl–Trek

Tim Declercq (born 21 March 1989 in Leuven) is a Belgian former cyclist, who last rode for UCI WorldTeam Lidl–Trek. His brother Benjamin was also a professional cyclist before retiring at the end of 2022.

Declerq is known to be a powerful rider who generally acts as a domestique. He earned the nickname "El Tractor" due to his frequent work riding at the front of the peloton. A 2020 poll of riders in the professional peloton by cyclingnews.com named Declercq as the best domestique in the world.

After retiring, he became a coach at his former team Soudal-Quick-Step.

== Major results ==
2007
1st Stage 1 Münsterland Giro
2011
1st Road race, National Under-23 Road Championships
Tour de Namur

1st Stages 2 & 5

2012
1st Internationale Wielertrofee Jong Maar Moedig
6th Coppa Bernocchi
10th Ronde van Zeeland Seaports
2013
1st Internationale Wielertrofee Jong Maar Moedig
4th Overall Le Triptyque des Monts et Châteaux
7th Tour du Finistère
9th Schaal Sels
2016
3rd Grand Prix de la Ville de Lillers
7th Dwars door het Hageland
7th Schaal Sels
8th Le Samyn
2017
3rd Gullegem Koerse
2019
1st Mountains classification, Volta ao Algarve
7th Le Samyn
2020
2nd Three Days of Bruges–De Panne
5th Omloop Het Nieuwsblad
9th Le Samyn
2022
4th Overall Saudi Tour

=== Grand Tour general classification results timeline ===
Grand Tour	2017	2018	2019	2020	2021	2022	2023	2024
Giro d'Italia	—	—	—	—	—	—	—	—
Tour de France	—	DNF	—	127	141	—	118	DNF
Vuelta a España	129	—	78	—	—	—	—	

Legend
—	Did not compete
DNF	Did not finish
