= Martin Urianstad =

Norwegian cyclist

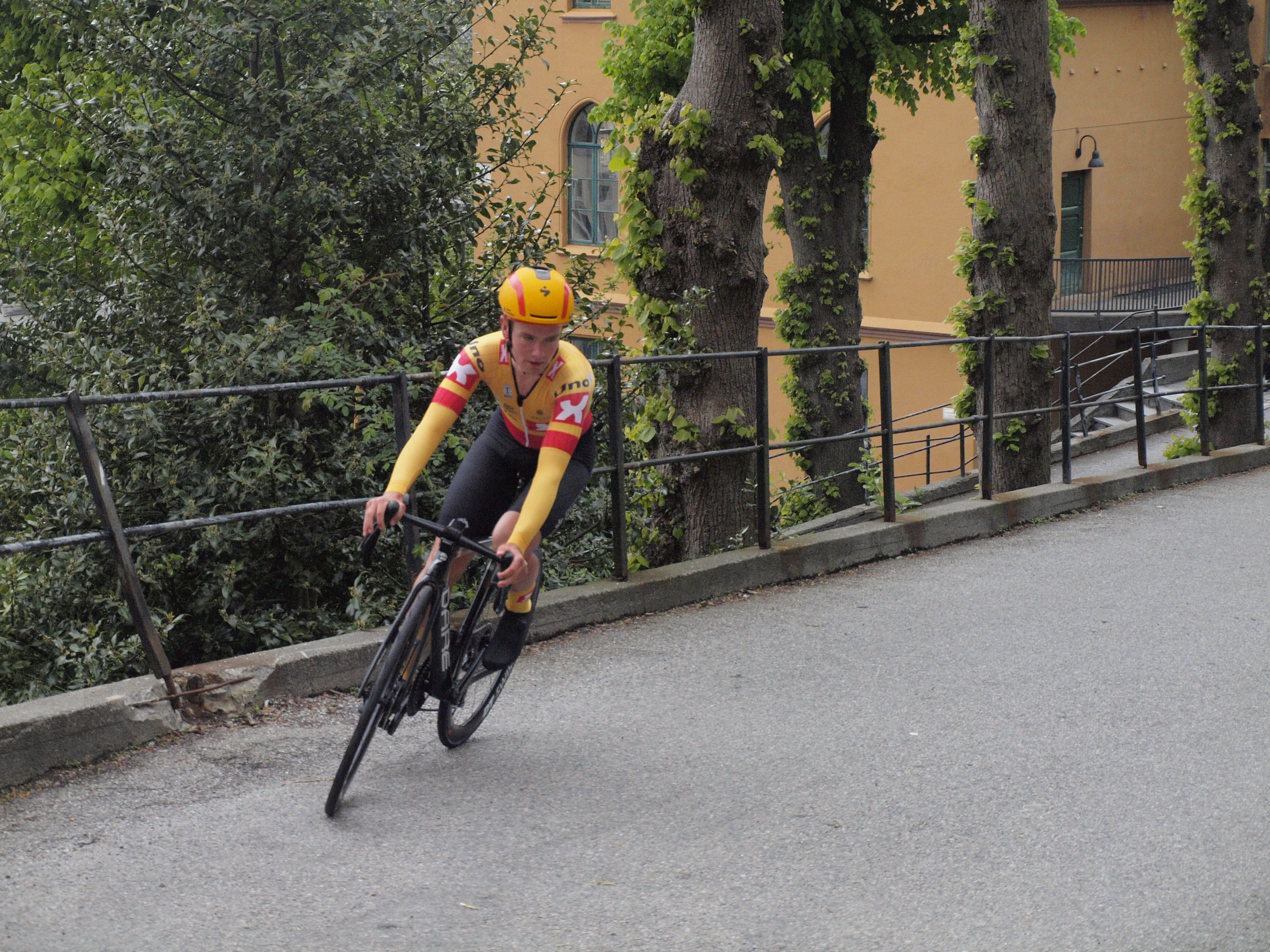
- Urianstad at the 2023 Tour of Norway

Personal information
- Full name: Martin Bugge Urianstad
- Born: 6 February 1999 (age 27) Stavanger, Norway

Cycling career
- Sport: Cycling
- Current team: Uno-X Mobility
- Discipline: Road
- Role: Rider

Professional teams
- 2018: Uno-X Norwegian Development Team (stagiaire)
- 2019–: Uno-X Norwegian Development Team

Martin Bugge Urianstad (born 6 February 1999) is a Norwegian professional road cyclist, who currently rides for UCI ProTeam Uno-X Mobility.

== Major results ==
2019
1st Mountains classification, Grand Prix Priessnitz spa
2020
1st Road race, National Under-23 Road Championships
2022
1st Active rider classification, Saudi Tour
2026
1st Mountains classification, Tour Down Under
