= 2022 Volta a Catalunya =

Spanish cycling race

2022 UCI World Tour, race 7 of 32
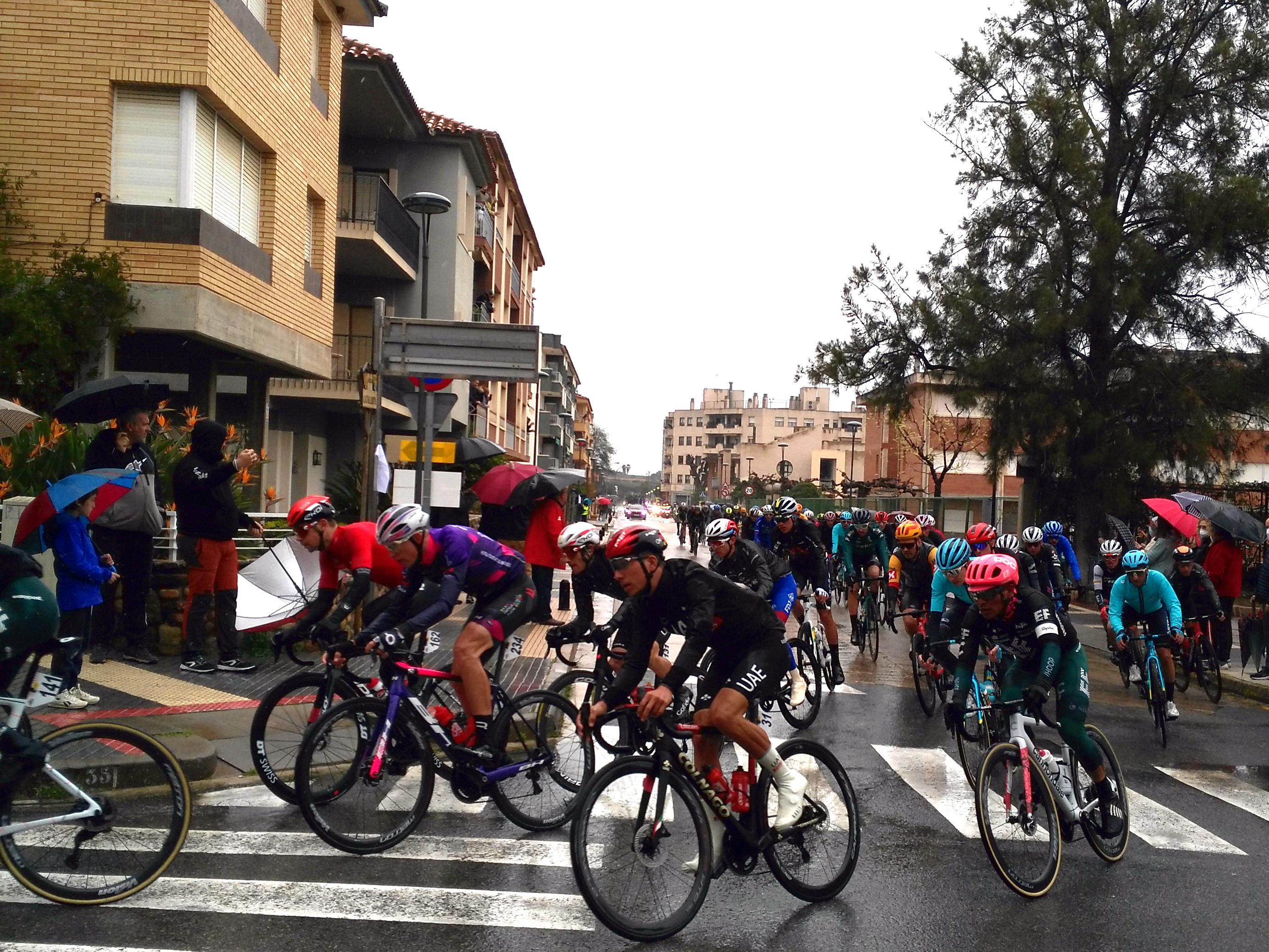
- Peloton passing through Riudoms on Stage 6

Race details
- Dates: 21–27 March 2022
- Stages: 7
- Distance: 1,213.9 km (754.3 mi)
- Winning time: 29h 53' 33"

Results
Jersey awarded to the overall winner	Winner	Sergio Higuita (COL)	(Bora–Hansgrohe)
	Second	Richard Carapaz (ECU)	(INEOS Grenadiers)
	Third	João Almeida (POR)	(UAE Team Emirates)
Jersey awarded to the points classification winner	Points	Kaden Groves (AUS)	(Team BikeExchange–Jayco)
Jersey awarded to the mountains classification winner	Mountains	Sergio Higuita (COL)	(Bora–Hansgrohe)
Jersey awarded to the young rider classification winner	Young rider	Sergio Higuita (COL)	(Bora–Hansgrohe)
Jersey awarded to the team classification winner	Team	Team Bahrain Victorious	

The 2022 Volta a Catalunya was a road cycling stage race that took place between 21 and 27 March 2022. The race took place primarily in the autonomous community of Catalonia in northeastern Spain, with the rest of the route in the department of Pyrénées-Orientales (known as Northern Catalonia) in southern France. It was the 101st edition of the Volta a Catalunya and the seventh race of the 2022 UCI World Tour.

== Teams ==
All 18 UCI WorldTeams and six UCI ProTeams made up the 24 teams that participated in the race. UCI ProTeam Gazprom–RusVelo was among the original invitees, but on 1 March 2022, the UCI revoked the licences of Russian and Belarusian teams due to the Russian invasion of Ukraine. Of the invited teams, all but three entered a full squad of seven riders; Bora–Hansgrohe, Lotto–Soudal, Team Jumbo–Visma each entered six riders. Israel–Premier Tech was reduced to six riders with one non-starter. In total, 165 riders started the race, of which 94 finished.

UCI WorldTeams

- AG2R Citroën Team
- Astana Qazaqstan Team
- Bora–Hansgrohe
- Cofidis
- EF Education–EasyPost
- Groupama–FDJ
- INEOS Grenadiers
- Intermarché–Wanty–Gobert Matériaux
- Israel–Premier Tech
- Lotto–Soudal
- Movistar Team
- Quick-Step Alpha Vinyl Team
- Team Bahrain Victorious
- Team BikeExchange–Jayco
- Team DSM
- Team Jumbo–Visma
- Trek–Segafredo
- UAE Team Emirates

UCI ProTeams

- Arkéa–Samsic
- Burgos BH
- Caja Rural–Seguros RGA
- Equipo Kern Pharma
- Euskaltel–Euskadi
- Uno-X Pro Cycling Team

== Route ==
The 2022 Volta a Catalunya route features seven stages and covers 1,213.9 kilometres (754.3 mi). After the previous nine editions of the race started in Calella, the first stage started and finished in Sant Feliu de Guíxols. L'Escala made its debut in the Volta as the start of stage 2. That same stage, the race crossed into France, finishing in Perpignan for the first time since the 1985 edition, before re-entering Spain during stage 3. Stages 3 and 4 both featured summit finishes at the ski resorts of La Molina and Boí Taüll, respectively, with the latter featuring for the first time since the 2002 edition. After a flat route for stage 5, from La Pobla de Segur to Vilanova i la Geltrú, the Costa Daurada hosted stage 6. The Volta concluded with the traditional last stage in and around Barcelona, finishing with six laps of a circuit around Montjuïc and Montjuïc Castle.

Stage characteristics and winners
Stage	Date	Course	Distance	Type	Winner
1	21 March	Sant Feliu de Guíxols to Sant Feliu de Guíxols	171.2 km (106.4 mi)	Flat stage	Michael Matthews (AUS)
2	22 March	L'Escala to Perpignan (France)	202.4 km (125.8 mi)	Flat stage	Kaden Groves (AUS)
3	23 March	Perpignan (France) to La Molina	161.1 km (100.1 mi)	Mountain stage	Ben O'Connor (AUS)
4	24 March	La Seu d'Urgell to Boí Taüll	166.7 km (103.6 mi)	Mountain stage	João Almeida (POR)
5	25 March	La Pobla de Segur to Vilanova i la Geltrú	206.3 km (128.2 mi)	Flat stage	Ethan Vernon (GBR)
6	26 March	Costa Daurada (Salou) to Costa Daurada (Cambrils)	167.6 km (104.1 mi)	Medium-mountain stage	Richard Carapaz (ECU)
7	27 March	Barcelona to Barcelona	138.6 km (86.1 mi)	Medium-mountain stage	Andrea Bagioli (ITA)
Total			1,213.9 km (754.3 mi)		

== Stages ==
=== Stage 1 ===
21 March 2022 — Sant Feliu de Guíxols to Sant Feliu de Guíxols, 171.2 km (106.4 mi)

After the stage, Sonny Colbrelli collapsed, fell unconscious, and required emergency medical treatment before being transferred to a hospital in a conscious and stable condition for further assessments.

Stage 1 Result (1–10)
Rank	Rider	Team	Time
1	Michael Matthews (AUS)	Team BikeExchange–Jayco	3h 47' 11"
2	Sonny Colbrelli (ITA)	Team Bahrain Victorious	+ 0"
3	Quentin Pacher (FRA)	Groupama–FDJ	+ 0"
4	Andrea Bagioli (ITA)	Quick-Step Alpha Vinyl Team	+ 0"
5	Sergio Higuita (COL)	Bora–Hansgrohe	+ 0"
6	Mattias Skjelmose Jensen (DEN)	Trek–Segafredo	+ 0"
7	Simon Clarke (AUS)	Israel–Premier Tech	+ 0"
8	Eduard Prades (ESP)	Caja Rural–Seguros RGA	+ 0"
9	Hugo Hofstetter (FRA)	Arkéa–Samsic	+ 0"
10	Attila Valter (HUN)	Groupama–FDJ	+ 0"

General classification after Stage 1 (1–10)
Rank	Rider	Team	Time
1	Michael Matthews (AUS)	Team BikeExchange–Jayco	3h 47' 01"
2	Jonas Iversby Hvideberg (NOR)	Team DSM	+ 4"
3	Sonny Colbrelli (ITA)	Team Bahrain Victorious	+ 4"
4	Quentin Pacher (FRA)	Groupama–FDJ	+ 6"
5	Andrea Bagioli (ITA)	Quick-Step Alpha Vinyl Team	+ 10"
6	Sergio Higuita (COL)	Bora–Hansgrohe	+ 10"
7	Mattias Skjelmose Jensen (DEN)	Trek–Segafredo	+ 10"
8	Simon Clarke (AUS)	Israel–Premier Tech	+ 10"
9	Eduard Prades (ESP)	Caja Rural–Seguros RGA	+ 10"
10	Hugo Hofstetter (FRA)	Arkéa–Samsic	+ 10"

=== Stage 2 ===
22 March 2022 — L'Escala to Perpignan (France), 202.4 km (125.8 mi)

Stage 2 Result (1–10)
Rank	Rider	Team	Time
1	Kaden Groves (AUS)	Team BikeExchange–Jayco	4h 44' 28"
2	Phil Bauhaus (GER)	Team Bahrain Victorious	+ 0"
3	Hugo Hofstetter (FRA)	Arkéa–Samsic	+ 0"
4	Ethan Vernon (GBR)	Quick-Step Alpha Vinyl Team	+ 0"
5	Juan Sebastián Molano (COL)	UAE Team Emirates	+ 0"
6	Manuel Peñalver (ESP)	Burgos BH	+ 0"
7	Michael Matthews (AUS)	Team BikeExchange–Jayco	+ 0"
8	Steven Kruijswijk (NED)	Team Jumbo–Visma	+ 0"
9	Henri Vandenabeele (BEL)	Team DSM	+ 0"
10	Mattias Skjelmose Jensen (DEN)	Trek–Segafredo	+ 0"

General classification after Stage 2 (1–10)
Rank	Rider	Team	Time
1	Jonas Iversby Hvideberg (NOR)	Team DSM	8h 31' 28"
2	Michael Matthews (AUS)	Team BikeExchange–Jayco	+ 1"
3	Hugo Hofstetter (FRA)	Arkéa–Samsic	+ 7"
4	Mattias Skjelmose Jensen (DEN)	Trek–Segafredo	+ 11"
5	Juan Sebastián Molano (COL)	UAE Team Emirates	+ 11"
6	Giulio Ciccone (ITA)	Trek–Segafredo	+ 11"
7	Tobias Halland Johannessen (NOR)	Uno-X Pro Cycling Team	+ 11"
8	Sergio Higuita (COL)	Bora–Hansgrohe	+ 11"
9	Jan Bakelants (BEL)	Intermarché–Wanty–Gobert Matériaux	+ 11"
10	Sam Oomen (NED)	Team Jumbo–Visma	+ 11"

=== Stage 3 ===
23 March 2022 — Perpignan (France) to La Molina, 161.1 km (100.1 mi)

Stage 3 Result (1–10)
Rank	Rider	Team	Time
1	Ben O'Connor (AUS)	AG2R Citroën Team	4h 12' 51"
2	Juan Ayuso (ESP)	UAE Team Emirates	+ 6"
3	Nairo Quintana (COL)	Arkéa–Samsic	+ 6"
4	Sergio Higuita (COL)	Bora–Hansgrohe	+ 6"
5	João Almeida (POR)	UAE Team Emirates	+ 6"
6	Wout Poels (NED)	Team Bahrain Victorious	+ 6"
7	Giulio Ciccone (ITA)	Trek–Segafredo	+ 6"
8	Tobias Halland Johannessen (NOR)	Uno-X Pro Cycling Team	+ 6"
9	Guillaume Martin (FRA)	Cofidis	+ 6"
10	Damien Howson (AUS)	Team BikeExchange–Jayco	+ 9"

General classification after Stage 3 (1–10)
Rank	Rider	Team	Time
1	Ben O'Connor (AUS)	AG2R Citroën Team	12h 44' 20"
2	Juan Ayuso (ESP)	UAE Team Emirates	+ 10"
3	Nairo Quintana (COL)	Arkéa–Samsic	+ 12"
4	Sergio Higuita (COL)	Bora–Hansgrohe	+ 16"
5	Giulio Ciccone (ITA)	Trek–Segafredo	+ 16"
6	Tobias Halland Johannessen (NOR)	Uno-X Pro Cycling Team	+ 16"
7	Wout Poels (NED)	Team Bahrain Victorious	+ 16"
8	Guillaume Martin (FRA)	Cofidis	+ 16"
9	João Almeida (POR)	UAE Team Emirates	+ 16"
10	Steven Kruijswijk (NED)	Team Jumbo–Visma	+ 19"

=== Stage 4 ===
24 March 2022 — La Seu d'Urgell to Boí Taüll, 166.7 km (103.6 mi)

Stage 4 Result (1–10)
Rank	Rider	Team	Time
1	João Almeida (POR)	UAE Team Emirates	4h 20' 27"
2	Nairo Quintana (COL)	Arkéa–Samsic	+ 0"
3	Sergio Higuita (COL)	Bora–Hansgrohe	+ 0"
4	Wout Poels (NED)	Team Bahrain Victorious	+ 7"
5	Tobias Halland Johannessen (NOR)	Uno-X Pro Cycling Team	+ 13"
6	Juan Ayuso (ESP)	UAE Team Emirates	+ 13"
7	Richard Carapaz (ECU)	INEOS Grenadiers	+ 13"
8	Jai Hindley (AUS)	Bora–Hansgrohe	+ 13"
9	Carlos Rodríguez (ESP)	INEOS Grenadiers	+ 13"
10	Guillaume Martin (FRA)	Cofidis	+ 13"

General classification after Stage 4 (1–10)
Rank	Rider	Team	Time
1	Nairo Quintana (COL)	Arkéa–Samsic	17h 04' 53"
2	João Almeida (POR)	UAE Team Emirates	+ 0"
3	Sergio Higuita (COL)	Bora–Hansgrohe	+ 6"
4	Juan Ayuso (ESP)	UAE Team Emirates	+ 17"
5	Wout Poels (NED)	Team Bahrain Victorious	+ 17"
6	Ben O'Connor (AUS)	AG2R Citroën Team	+ 17"
7	Tobias Halland Johannessen (NOR)	Uno-X Pro Cycling Team	+ 23"
8	Guillaume Martin (FRA)	Cofidis	+ 23"
9	Richard Carapaz (ECU)	INEOS Grenadiers	+ 26"
10	Torstein Træen (NOR)	Uno-X Pro Cycling Team	+ 34"

=== Stage 5 ===
25 March 2022 — La Pobla de Segur to Vilanova i la Geltrú, 206.3 km (128.2 mi)

Stage 5 Result (1–10)
Rank	Rider	Team	Time
1	Ethan Vernon (GBR)	Quick-Step Alpha Vinyl Team	5h 21' 17"
2	Phil Bauhaus (GER)	Team Bahrain Victorious	+ 0"
3	Dorian Godon (FRA)	AG2R Citroën Team	+ 0"
4	Guillaume Boivin (CAN)	Israel–Premier Tech	+ 0"
5	Kaden Groves (AUS)	Team BikeExchange–Jayco	+ 0"
6	Martin Laas (EST)	Bora–Hansgrohe	+ 0"
7	Manuel Peñalver (ESP)	Burgos BH	+ 0"
8	Ivo Oliveira (POR)	UAE Team Emirates	+ 0"
9	Hugo Hofstetter (FRA)	Arkéa–Samsic	+ 0"
10	Guillaume Martin (FRA)	Cofidis	+ 0"

General classification after Stage 5 (1–10)
Rank	Rider	Team	Time
1	João Almeida (POR)	UAE Team Emirates	22h 26' 09"
2	Nairo Quintana (COL)	Arkéa–Samsic	+ 1"
3	Sergio Higuita (COL)	Bora–Hansgrohe	+ 7"
4	Juan Ayuso (ESP)	UAE Team Emirates	+ 18"
5	Wout Poels (NED)	Team Bahrain Victorious	+ 18"
6	Ben O'Connor (AUS)	AG2R Citroën Team	+ 18"
7	Tobias Halland Johannessen (NOR)	Uno-X Pro Cycling Team	+ 21"
8	Guillaume Martin (FRA)	Cofidis	+ 24"
9	Richard Carapaz (ECU)	INEOS Grenadiers	+ 27"
10	Torstein Træen (NOR)	Uno-X Pro Cycling Team	+ 35"

=== Stage 6 ===
26 March 2022 — Costa Daurada (Salou) to Costa Daurada (Cambrils), 167.6 km (104.1 mi)

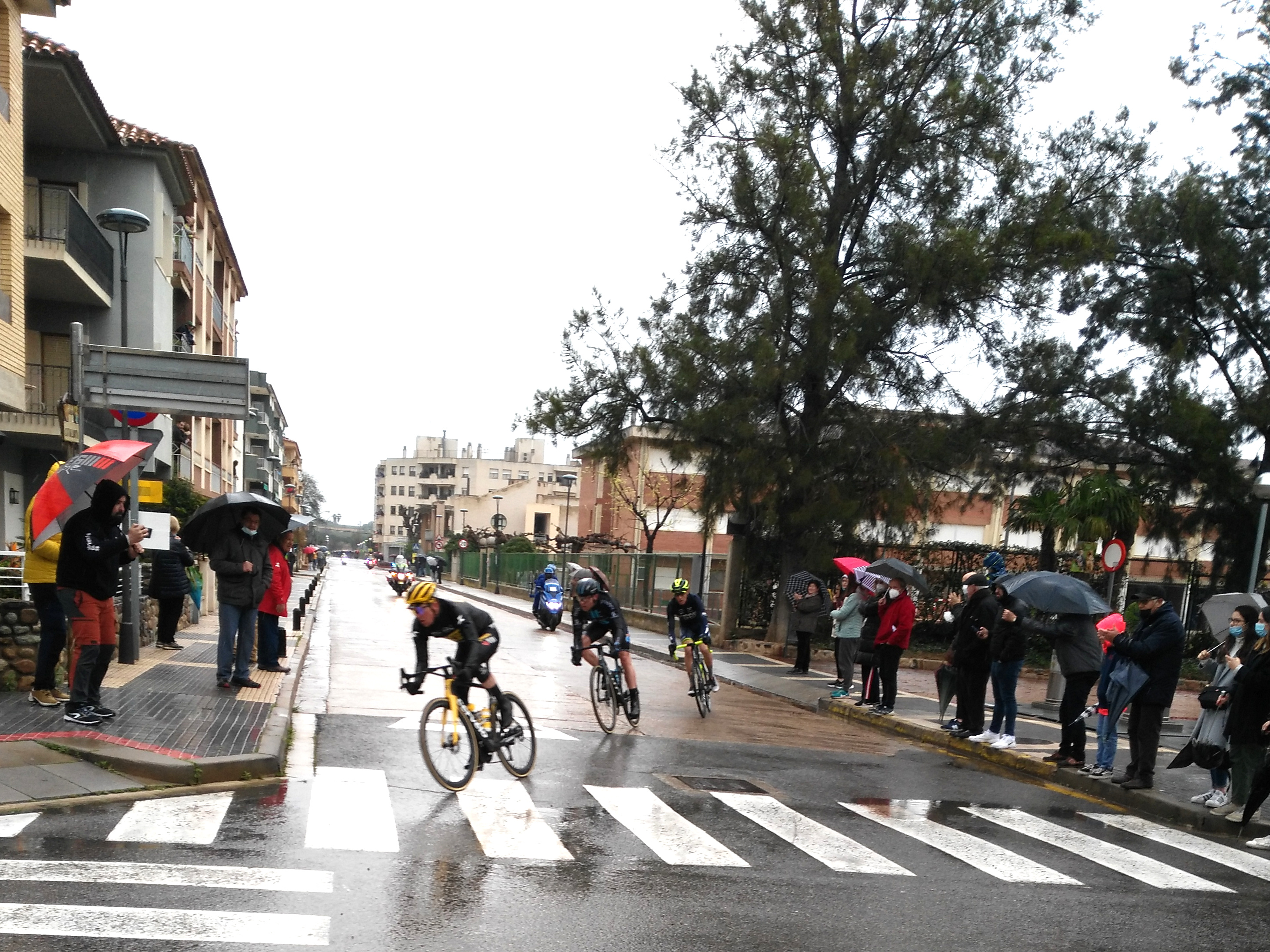
The early breakaway of the stage passing through Riudoms. From left to right: Steven Kruijswijk (Team Jumbo–Visma, Casper Pedersen (Team DSM), and Simone Petilli (Intermarché–Wanty–Gobert Matériaux)

Stage 6 Result (1–10)
Rank	Rider	Team	Time
1	Richard Carapaz (ECU)	INEOS Grenadiers	4h 09' 19"
2	Sergio Higuita (COL)	Bora–Hansgrohe	+ 0"
3	Kaden Groves (AUS)	Team BikeExchange–Jayco	+ 48"
4	Simone Velasco (ITA)	Astana Qazaqstan Team	+ 48"
5	Quentin Pacher (FRA)	Groupama–FDJ	+ 48"
6	Jan Bakelants (BEL)	Intermarché–Wanty–Gobert Matériaux	+ 48"
7	Fernando Barceló (ESP)	Caja Rural–Seguros RGA	+ 48"
8	Dorian Godon (FRA)	AG2R Citroën Team	+ 48"
9	Mattias Skjelmose Jensen (DEN)	Trek–Segafredo	+ 48"
10	Henri Vandenabeele (BEL)	Team DSM	+ 48"

General classification after Stage 6 (1–10)
Rank	Rider	Team	Time
1	Sergio Higuita (COL)	Bora–Hansgrohe	26h 35' 24"
2	Richard Carapaz (ECU)	INEOS Grenadiers	+ 16"
3	João Almeida (POR)	UAE Team Emirates	+ 52"
4	Nairo Quintana (COL)	Arkéa–Samsic	+ 53"
5	Juan Ayuso (ESP)	UAE Team Emirates	+ 1' 08"
6	Wout Poels (NED)	Team Bahrain Victorious	+ 1' 10"
7	Ben O'Connor (AUS)	AG2R Citroën Team	+ 1' 10"
8	Tobias Halland Johannessen (NOR)	Uno-X Pro Cycling Team	+ 1' 13"
9	Guillaume Martin (FRA)	Cofidis	+ 1' 16"
10	Torstein Træen (NOR)	Uno-X Pro Cycling Team	+ 1' 27"

=== Stage 7 ===
27 March 2022 — Barcelona to Barcelona, 138.6 km (86.1 mi)

Stage 7 Result (1–10)
Rank	Rider	Team	Time
1	Andrea Bagioli (ITA)	Quick-Step Alpha Vinyl Team	3h 18' 09"
2	Attila Valter (HUN)	Groupama–FDJ	+ 0"
3	Fernando Barceló (ESP)	Caja Rural–Seguros RGA	+ 0"
4	Juan Ayuso (ESP)	UAE Team Emirates	+ 0"
5	Dylan Teuns (BEL)	Team Bahrain Victorious	+ 0"
6	Guillaume Martin (FRA)	Cofidis	+ 0"
7	Nairo Quintana (COL)	Arkéa–Samsic	+ 0"
8	Carlos Verona (ESP)	Movistar Team	+ 0"
9	Sergio Higuita (COL)	Bora–Hansgrohe	+ 0"
10	Richard Carapaz (ECU)	INEOS Grenadiers	+ 0"

General classification after Stage 7 (1–10)
Rank	Rider	Team	Time
1	Sergio Higuita (COL)	Bora–Hansgrohe	29h 53' 33"
2	Richard Carapaz (ECU)	INEOS Grenadiers	+ 16"
3	João Almeida (POR)	UAE Team Emirates	+ 52"
4	Nairo Quintana (COL)	Arkéa–Samsic	+ 53"
5	Juan Ayuso (ESP)	UAE Team Emirates	+ 1' 08"
6	Ben O'Connor (AUS)	AG2R Citroën Team	+ 1' 10"
7	Tobias Halland Johannessen (NOR)	Uno-X Pro Cycling Team	+ 1' 13"
8	Guillaume Martin (FRA)	Cofidis	+ 1' 16"
9	Torstein Træen (NOR)	Uno-X Pro Cycling Team	+ 1' 27"
10	Sam Oomen (NED)	Team Jumbo–Visma	+ 1' 55"

== Classification leadership table ==
Classification leadership by stage
Stage	Winner	General classification	Points classification	Mountains classification	Young rider classification	Team classification	Combativity award
1	Michael Matthews	Michael Matthews	Michael Matthews	Jonas Iversby Hvideberg	Jonas Iversby Hvideberg	Team Bahrain Victorious	Jonathan Caicedo
2	Kaden Groves	Jonas Iversby Hvideberg	Jonas Iversby Hvideberg	Jonas Iversby Hvideberg	Jonas Iversby Hvideberg	Team Bahrain Victorious	Adrià Moreno
3	Ben O'Connor	Ben O'Connor	Jonas Iversby Hvideberg	Ander Okamika	Juan Ayuso	UAE Team Emirates	Mikel Bizkarra
4	João Almeida	Nairo Quintana	Jonas Iversby Hvideberg	Mikel Bizkarra	João Almeida	UAE Team Emirates	Marc Soler
5	Ethan Vernon	João Almeida	Phil Bauhaus	Mikel Bizkarra	João Almeida	UAE Team Emirates	Urko Berrade
6	Richard Carapaz	Sergio Higuita	Richard Carapaz	Sergio Higuita	Sergio Higuita	Team Bahrain Victorious	Richard Carapaz
7	Andrea Bagioli	Sergio Higuita	Kaden Groves	Sergio Higuita	Sergio Higuita	Team Bahrain Victorious	Steven Kruijswijk
Final		Sergio Higuita	Kaden Groves	Sergio Higuita	Sergio Higuita	Team Bahrain Victorious	Not awarded

- On stage 2, Quentin Pacher, who was fourth in the points classification, wore the blue-striped jersey, because first-placed Michael Matthews wore the green-striped jersey as the leader of the general classification, second-placed Jonas Iversby Hvideberg wore the red-striped jersey as the leader of the mountains classification, and third-placed Sonny Colbrelli withdrew before the stage.
- On stage 2, Andrea Bagioli, who was second in the young rider classification, wore the orange-striped jersey, because first-placed Jonas Iversby Hvideberg wore the red-striped jersey as the leader of the mountains classification.
- On stage 3, Michael Matthews, who was second in the points classification, wore the blue-striped jersey, because first-placed Jonas Iversby Hvideberg wore the green-striped jersey as the leader of the general classification. For the same reason, Joan Bou, who was second in the mountains classification, wore the red-striped jersey, and Mattias Skjelmose Jensen, who was second in the young rider classification, wore the orange-striped jersey.
- On stage 6, Juan Ayuso, who was third in the young rider classification, wore the orange-striped jersey, because first-placed João Almeida wore the green-striped jersey as the leader of the general classification and second-placed Sergio Higuita wore the Colombian national champion's jersey as the defending Colombian national road race champion.
- On stage 7, Mikel Bizkarra, who was second in the mountains classification, wore the red-striped jersey, because first-placed Sergio Higuita wore the green-striped jersey as the leader of the general classification. For the same reason, João Almeida, who was second in the young rider classification, wore the orange-striped jersey.

== Final classification standings ==
Legend
Denotes the winner of the general classification	Denotes the winner of the young rider classification
Denotes the winner of the points classification	Denotes the winner of the team classification
Denotes the winner of the mountains classification	Denotes the winner of the combativity award

=== General classification ===
Final general classification (1–10)
Rank	Rider	Team	Time
1	Sergio Higuita (COL)	Bora–Hansgrohe	29h 53' 33"
2	Richard Carapaz (ECU)	INEOS Grenadiers	+ 16"
3	João Almeida (POR)	UAE Team Emirates	+ 52"
4	Nairo Quintana (COL)	Arkéa–Samsic	+ 53"
5	Juan Ayuso (ESP)	UAE Team Emirates	+ 1' 08"
6	Ben O'Connor (AUS)	AG2R Citroën Team	+ 1' 10"
7	Tobias Halland Johannessen (NOR)	Uno-X Pro Cycling Team	+ 1' 13"
8	Guillaume Martin (FRA)	Cofidis	+ 1' 16"
9	Torstein Træen (NOR)	Uno-X Pro Cycling Team	+ 1' 27"
10	Sam Oomen (NED)	Team Jumbo–Visma	+ 1' 55"

=== Points classification ===
Final points classification (1–10)
Rank	Rider	Team	Points
1	Kaden Groves (AUS)	Team BikeExchange–Jayco	17
2	Richard Carapaz (ECU)	INEOS Grenadiers	15
3	Sergio Higuita (COL)	Bora–Hansgrohe	15
4	João Almeida (POR)	UAE Team Emirates	11
5	Ben O'Connor (AUS)	AG2R Citroën Team	10
6	Andrea Bagioli (ITA)	Quick-Step Alpha Vinyl Team	10
7	Ethan Vernon (GBR)	Quick-Step Alpha Vinyl Team	10
8	Nairo Quintana (COL)	Arkéa–Samsic	10
9	Juan Ayuso (ESP)	UAE Team Emirates	8
10	Attila Valter (HUN)	Groupama–FDJ	6

=== Mountains classification ===
Final mountains classification (1–10)
Rank	Rider	Team	Points
1	Sergio Higuita (COL)	Bora–Hansgrohe	28
2	Mikel Bizkarra (ESP)	Euskaltel–Euskadi	21
3	Ander Okamika (ESP)	Burgos BH	20
4	Marc Soler (ESP)	UAE Team Emirates	20
5	Steven Kruijswijk (NED)	Team Jumbo–Visma	17
6	João Almeida (POR)	UAE Team Emirates	16
7	Juan Ayuso (ESP)	UAE Team Emirates	16
8	Jesús Herrada (ESP)	Cofidis	15
9	Nairo Quintana (COL)	Arkéa–Samsic	14
10	Quentin Pacher (FRA)	Groupama–FDJ	12

=== Young rider classification ===
Final young rider classification (1–10)
Rank	Rider	Team	Time
1	Sergio Higuita (COL)	Bora–Hansgrohe	29h 53' 33"
2	João Almeida (POR)	UAE Team Emirates	+ 52"
3	Juan Ayuso (ESP)	UAE Team Emirates	+ 1' 08"
4	Tobias Halland Johannessen (NOR)	Uno-X Pro Cycling Team	+ 1' 13"
5	Carlos Rodríguez (ESP)	INEOS Grenadiers	+ 2' 50"
6	Mattias Skjelmose Jensen (DEN)	Trek–Segafredo	+ 2' 54"
7	Javier Romo (ESP)	Astana Qazaqstan Team	+ 12' 35"
8	Attila Valter (HUN)	Groupama–FDJ	+ 17' 35"
9	Sylvain Moniquet (BEL)	Lotto–Soudal	+ 20' 50"
10	Henri Vandenabeele (BEL)	Team DSM	+ 23' 52"

=== Team classification ===
Final team classification (1–10)
Rank	Team	Time
1	Team Bahrain Victorious	89h 46' 49"
2	UAE Team Emirates	+ 6' 35"
3	Groupama–FDJ	+ 7' 18"
4	Uno-X Pro Cycling Team	+ 7' 20"
5	INEOS Grenadiers	+ 11' 14"
6	Bora–Hansgrohe	+ 11' 15"
7	Trek–Segafredo	+ 17' 53"
8	Intermarché–Wanty–Gobert Matériaux	+ 18' 00"
9	Movistar Team	+ 24' 50"
10	Team Jumbo–Visma	+ 26' 44"
