= 2022 Saudi Tour =

Saudi Arabian cycling race

2022 UCI Asia Tour

Race details
- Dates: 1–5 February 2022
- Stages: 5
- Distance: 831.3 km (516.5 mi)
- Winning time: 20h 05' 48"

Results
Jersey awarded to the overall winner	Winner	Maxim Van Gils (BEL)	(Lotto–Soudal)
	Second	Santiago Buitrago (COL)	(Team Bahrain Victorious)
	Third	Rui Costa (POR)	(UAE Team Emirates)
Jersey awarded to the points classification winner	Points	Dylan Groenewegen (NED)	(Team BikeExchange–Jayco)
Jersey awarded to the youth classification winner	Youth	Maxim Van Gils (BEL)	(Lotto–Soudal)
Jersey awarded to the sprints classification winner	Sprints	Martin Urianstad (NOR)	(Uno-X Pro Cycling Team)
	Team	Quick-Step Alpha Vinyl Team	

The 2022 Saudi Tour was a road cycling stage race that took place between 1 and 5 February 2022 in Saudi Arabia. The race was rated as a category 2.1 event on the 2022 UCI Asia Tour calendar, and was the sixth edition of the Saudi Tour.

== Teams ==
Eight of the 18 UCI WorldTeams, five UCI ProTeams, and two UCI Continental teams made up the 15 teams that participated in the race. Of these teams, only eight entered a full squad of seven riders. Five teams (Alpecin–Fenix, B&B Hotels–KTM, Cofidis, Kuwait Pro Cycling Team, and UAE Team Emirates) entered six riders each, while the remaining two teams (Arkéa–Samsic and Terengganu Polygon Cycling Team) entered five riders each. In total, 96 riders started the race, of which 86 finished.

UCI WorldTeams

- Bora–Hansgrohe
- Cofidis
- Lotto–Soudal
- Quick-Step Alpha Vinyl Team
- Team Bahrain Victorious
- Team BikeExchange–Jayco
- Team DSM
- UAE Team Emirates

UCI ProTeams

- Alpecin–Fenix
- Arkéa–Samsic
- B&B Hotels–KTM
- Team TotalEnergies
- Uno-X Pro Cycling Team

UCI Continental Teams

- Kuwait Pro Cycling Team
- Terengganu Polygon Cycling Team

== Route ==
Stage characteristics and winners
Stage	Date	Course	Distance	Type	Stage winner
1	1 February	Winter Park to Winter Park	198 km (123 mi)	Flat stage	Caleb Ewan (AUS)
2	2 February	Taibah University to Abu Rakah	163.9 km (101.8 mi)	Hilly stage	Santiago Buitrago (COL)
3	3 February	Tayma Hadaj Well to Al Ula Old Town	181.2 km (112.6 mi)	Flat stage	Dylan Groenewegen (NED)
4	4 February	Winter Park to Skyviews of Harrat Uwayrid	149.3 km (92.8 mi)	Hilly stage	Maxim Van Gils (BEL)
5	5 February	Al Ula Old Town to Al Ula Old Town	138.9 km (86.3 mi)	Flat stage	Dylan Groenewegen (NED)
Total			831.3 km (516.5 mi)		

== Stages ==
=== Stage 1 ===
1 February 2022 — Winter Park to Winter Park, 198 km (123 mi)

Stage 1 Result (1–10)
Rank	Rider	Team	Time
1	Caleb Ewan (AUS)	Lotto–Soudal	4h 41' 52"
2	Martin Laas (EST)	Bora–Hansgrohe	+ 0"
3	Fernando Gaviria (COL)	UAE Team Emirates	+ 0"
4	Jasper De Buyst (BEL)	Lotto–Soudal	+ 0"
5	Niccolò Bonifazio (ITA)	Team TotalEnergies	+ 0"
6	Felix Groß (GER)	UAE Team Emirates	+ 0"
7	Simon Dehairs (BEL)	Alpecin–Fenix	+ 0"
8	Davide Ballerini (ITA)	Quick-Step Alpha Vinyl Team	+ 0"
9	Jérémy Lecroq (FRA)	B&B Hotels–KTM	+ 0"
10	Simone Consonni (ITA)	Cofidis	+ 0"

General classification after Stage 1 (1–10)
Rank	Rider	Team	Time
1	Caleb Ewan (AUS)	Lotto–Soudal	4h 41' 42"
2	Martin Laas (EST)	Bora–Hansgrohe	+ 4"
3	Fernando Gaviria (COL)	UAE Team Emirates	+ 6"
4	Rui Costa (POR)	UAE Team Emirates	+ 7"
5	Martin Urianstad (NOR)	Uno-X Pro Cycling Team	+ 8"
6	Tim Declercq (BEL)	Quick-Step Alpha Vinyl Team	+ 9"
7	Jasper De Buyst (BEL)	Lotto–Soudal	+ 10"
8	Niccolò Bonifazio (ITA)	Team TotalEnergies	+ 10"
9	Felix Groß (GER)	UAE Team Emirates	+ 10"
10	Simon Dehairs (BEL)	Alpecin–Fenix	+ 10"

=== Stage 2 ===
2 February 2022 — Taibah University to Abu Rakah, 163.9 km (101.8 mi)

Stage 2 Result (1–10)
Rank	Rider	Team	Time
1	Santiago Buitrago (COL)	Team Bahrain Victorious	3h 43' 51"
2	Andrea Bagioli (ITA)	Quick-Step Alpha Vinyl Team	+ 1"
3	Anthon Charmig (DEN)	Uno-X Pro Cycling Team	+ 7"
4	Maxim Van Gils (BEL)	Lotto–Soudal	+ 7"
5	Rui Costa (POR)	UAE Team Emirates	+ 7"
6	Caleb Ewan (AUS)	Lotto–Soudal	+ 7"
7	Axel Zingle (FRA)	Cofidis	+ 11"
8	Rui Oliveira (POR)	UAE Team Emirates	+ 11"
9	Cyril Barthe (FRA)	B&B Hotels–KTM	+ 11"
10	Benjamin Declercq (BEL)	Arkéa–Samsic	+ 11"

General classification after Stage 2 (1–10)
Rank	Rider	Team	Time
1	Santiago Buitrago (COL)	Team Bahrain Victorious	8h 25' 33"
2	Caleb Ewan (AUS)	Lotto–Soudal	+ 7"
3	Anthon Charmig (DEN)	Uno-X Pro Cycling Team	+ 13"
4	Rui Costa (POR)	UAE Team Emirates	+ 14"
5	Maxim Van Gils (BEL)	Lotto–Soudal	+ 17"
6	Tim Declercq (BEL)	Quick-Step Alpha Vinyl Team	+ 20"
7	Simone Consonni (ITA)	Cofidis	+ 21"
8	Cyril Barthe (FRA)	B&B Hotels–KTM	+ 21"
9	Danny van Poppel (NED)	Bora–Hansgrohe	+ 21"
10	Rubén Fernández (ESP)	Cofidis	+ 21"

=== Stage 3 ===
3 February 2022 — Tayma Hadaj Well to Al Ula Old Town, 181.2 km (112.6 mi)

Stage 3 Result (1–10)
Rank	Rider	Team	Time
1	Dylan Groenewegen (NED)	Team BikeExchange–Jayco	5h 11' 22"
2	Daniel McLay (GBR)	Arkéa–Samsic	+ 0"
3	Caleb Ewan (AUS)	Lotto–Soudal	+ 0"
4	Danny van Poppel (NED)	Bora–Hansgrohe	+ 0"
5	Alberto Dainese (ITA)	Team DSM	+ 0"
6	Fernando Gaviria (COL)	UAE Team Emirates	+ 0"
7	Erlend Blikra (NOR)	Uno-X Pro Cycling Team	+ 0"
8	Jasper De Buyst (BEL)	Lotto–Soudal	+ 0"
9	Simone Consonni (ITA)	Cofidis	+ 0"
10	Davide Ballerini (ITA)	Quick-Step Alpha Vinyl Team	+ 0"

General classification after Stage 3 (1–10)
Rank	Rider	Team	Time
1	Santiago Buitrago (COL)	Team Bahrain Victorious	13h 36' 55"
2	Caleb Ewan (AUS)	Lotto–Soudal	+ 3"
3	Rui Costa (POR)	UAE Team Emirates	+ 13"
4	Anthon Charmig (DEN)	Uno-X Pro Cycling Team	+ 13"
5	Maxim Van Gils (BEL)	Lotto–Soudal	+ 17"
6	Tim Declercq (BEL)	Quick-Step Alpha Vinyl Team	+ 20"
7	Simone Consonni (ITA)	Cofidis	+ 21"
8	Danny van Poppel (NED)	Bora–Hansgrohe	+ 21"
9	Cyril Barthe (FRA)	B&B Hotels–KTM	+ 21"
10	Rubén Fernández (ESP)	Cofidis	+ 21"

=== Stage 4 ===
4 February 2022 — Winter Park to Skyviews of Harrat Uwayrid, 149.3 km (92.8 mi)

Stage 4 Result (1–10)
Rank	Rider	Team	Time
1	Maxim Van Gils (BEL)	Lotto–Soudal	3h 32' 39"
2	Luka Mezgec (SLO)	Team BikeExchange–Jayco	+ 40"
3	Tim Declercq (BEL)	Quick-Step Alpha Vinyl Team	+ 40"
4	Danny van Poppel (NED)	Bora–Hansgrohe	+ 40"
5	Rui Costa (POR)	UAE Team Emirates	+ 40"
6	Daniel Oss (ITA)	Team TotalEnergies	+ 40"
7	Alexis Renard (FRA)	Cofidis	+ 40"
8	Santiago Buitrago (COL)	Team Bahrain Victorious	+ 40"
9	Andrea Bagioli (ITA)	Quick-Step Alpha Vinyl Team	+ 44"
10	Alexandre Geniez (FRA)	Team TotalEnergies	+ 1' 19"

General classification after Stage 4 (1–10)
Rank	Rider	Team	Time
1	Maxim Van Gils (BEL)	Lotto–Soudal	17h 09' 38"
2	Santiago Buitrago (COL)	Team Bahrain Victorious	+ 36"
3	Rui Costa (POR)	UAE Team Emirates	+ 48"
4	Tim Declercq (BEL)	Quick-Step Alpha Vinyl Team	+ 52"
5	Danny van Poppel (NED)	Bora–Hansgrohe	+ 57"
6	Daniel Oss (ITA)	Team TotalEnergies	+ 57"
7	Anthon Charmig (DEN)	Uno-X Pro Cycling Team	+ 1' 29"
8	Alexandre Geniez (FRA)	Team TotalEnergies	+ 1' 36"
9	Alexis Renard (FRA)	Cofidis	+ 1' 45"
10	Simone Consonni (ITA)	Cofidis	+ 1' 46"

=== Stage 5 ===
5 February 2022 — Al Ula Old Town to Al Ula Old Town, 138.9 km (86.3 mi)

Stage 5 Result (1–10)
Rank	Rider	Team	Time
1	Dylan Groenewegen (NED)	Team BikeExchange–Jayco	2h 56' 10"
2	Daniel McLay (GBR)	Arkéa–Samsic	+ 0"
3	Davide Ballerini (ITA)	Quick-Step Alpha Vinyl Team	+ 0"
4	Fernando Gaviria (COL)	UAE Team Emirates	+ 0"
5	Danny van Poppel (NED)	Bora–Hansgrohe	+ 0"
6	Niccolò Bonifazio (ITA)	Team TotalEnergies	+ 0"
7	Jasper De Buyst (BEL)	Lotto–Soudal	+ 0"
8	Jérémy Lecroq (FRA)	B&B Hotels–KTM	+ 0"
9	Erlend Blikra (NOR)	Uno-X Pro Cycling Team	+ 0"
10	Alberto Dainese (ITA)	Team DSM	+ 0"

General classification after Stage 5 (1–10)
Rank	Rider	Team	Time
1	Maxim Van Gils (BEL)	Lotto–Soudal	20h 05' 48"
2	Santiago Buitrago (COL)	Team Bahrain Victorious	+ 36"
3	Rui Costa (POR)	UAE Team Emirates	+ 48"
4	Tim Declercq (BEL)	Quick-Step Alpha Vinyl Team	+ 52"
5	Danny van Poppel (NED)	Bora–Hansgrohe	+ 54"
6	Daniel Oss (ITA)	Team TotalEnergies	+ 57"
7	Anthon Charmig (DEN)	Uno-X Pro Cycling Team	+ 1' 29"
8	Alexandre Geniez (FRA)	Team TotalEnergies	+ 1' 36"
9	Benjamin Declercq (BEL)	Arkéa–Samsic	+ 1' 45"
10	Alexis Renard (FRA)	Cofidis	+ 1' 45"

== Classification leadership table ==
Classification leadership by stage
Stage	Winner	General classification	Points classification	Active rider classification	Young rider classification	Team classification
1	Caleb Ewan	Caleb Ewan	Caleb Ewan	Martin Urianstad	Martin Urianstad	Lotto–Soudal
2	Santiago Buitrago	Santiago Buitrago	Caleb Ewan	Martin Urianstad	Santiago Buitrago	Cofidis
3	Dylan Groenewegen	Santiago Buitrago	Caleb Ewan	Martin Urianstad	Santiago Buitrago	Cofidis
4	Maxim Van Gils	Maxim Van Gils	Caleb Ewan	Martin Urianstad	Maxim Van Gils	Quick-Step Alpha Vinyl Team
5	Dylan Groenewegen	Maxim Van Gils	Dylan Groenewegen	Martin Urianstad	Maxim Van Gils	Quick-Step Alpha Vinyl Team
Final		Maxim Van Gils	Dylan Groenewegen	Martin Urianstad	Maxim Van Gils	Quick-Step Alpha Vinyl Team

- On stage 2, Martin Laas, who was second in the points classification, wore the red jersey, because first-placed Caleb Ewan wore the green jersey as the leader of the general classification.
- On stage 2, Polychronis Tzortzakis, who was second in the active rider classification, wore the blue jersey, because first-placed Martin Urianstad wore the white jersey as the leader of the young rider classification.
- On stages 3 and 4, Anthon Charmig, who was second in the young rider classification, wore the white jersey, because first-placed Santiago Buitrago wore the green jersey as the leader of the general classification. For the same reason, on stage 5, Buitrago wore the white jersey with Maxim Van Gils leading the general classification.

== Final classification standings ==
Legend
Denotes the winner of the general classification	Denotes the winner of the active rider classification
Denotes the winner of the points classification	Denotes the winner of the young rider classification

=== General classification ===
Final general classification (1–10)
Rank	Rider	Team	Time
1	Maxim Van Gils (BEL)	Lotto–Soudal	20h 05' 48"
2	Santiago Buitrago (COL)	Team Bahrain Victorious	+ 36"
3	Rui Costa (POR)	UAE Team Emirates	+ 48"
4	Tim Declercq (BEL)	Quick-Step Alpha Vinyl Team	+ 52"
5	Danny van Poppel (NED)	Bora–Hansgrohe	+ 54"
6	Daniel Oss (ITA)	Team TotalEnergies	+ 57"
7	Anthon Charmig (DEN)	Uno-X Pro Cycling Team	+ 1' 29"
8	Alexandre Geniez (FRA)	Team TotalEnergies	+ 1' 36"
9	Benjamin Declercq (BEL)	Arkéa–Samsic	+ 1' 45"
10	Alexis Renard (FRA)	Cofidis	+ 1' 45"

=== Points classification ===
Final points classification (1–10)
Rank	Rider	Team	Points
1	Dylan Groenewegen (NED)	Team BikeExchange–Jayco	30
2	Caleb Ewan (AUS)	Lotto–Soudal	29
3	Daniel McLay (GBR)	Arkéa–Samsic	24
4	Maxim Van Gils (BEL)	Lotto–Soudal	22
5	Fernando Gaviria (COL)	UAE Team Emirates	21
6	Danny van Poppel (NED)	Bora–Hansgrohe	20
7	Santiago Buitrago (COL)	Team Bahrain Victorious	18
8	Jasper De Buyst (BEL)	Lotto–Soudal	14
9	Andrea Bagioli (ITA)	Quick-Step Alpha Vinyl Team	14
10	Davide Ballerini (ITA)	Quick-Step Alpha Vinyl Team	13

=== Active rider classification ===
Final active rider classification (1–10)
Rank	Rider	Team	Points
1	Martin Urianstad (NOR)	Uno-X Pro Cycling Team	23
2	Polychronis Tzortzakis (GRE)	Kuwait Pro Cycling Team	15
3	Anthony Turgis (FRA)	Team TotalEnergies	11
4	Rui Costa (POR)	UAE Team Emirates	5
5	Jannik Steimle (GER)	Quick-Step Alpha Vinyl Team	5
6	Jeroen Meijers (NED)	Terengganu Polygon Cycling Team	4
7	Maxim Van Gils (BEL)	Lotto–Soudal	3
8	Danny van Poppel (NED)	Bora–Hansgrohe	3
9	Edward Planckaert (BEL)	Alpecin–Fenix	3
10	Simone Consonni (ITA)	Cofidis	2

=== Young rider classification ===
Final young rider classification (1–10)
Rank	Rider	Team	Time
1	Maxim Van Gils (BEL)	Lotto–Soudal	20h 05' 48"
2	Santiago Buitrago (COL)	Team Bahrain Victorious	+ 36"
3	Anthon Charmig (DEN)	Uno-X Pro Cycling Team	+ 1' 29"
4	Alexis Renard (FRA)	Cofidis	+ 1' 45"
5	Donavan Grondin (FRA)	Arkéa–Samsic	+ 2' 13"
6	Filip Maciejuk (POL)	Team Bahrain Victorious	+ 4' 03"
7	Alberto Dainese (ITA)	Team DSM	+ 5' 17"
8	Casper Van Uden (NED)	Team DSM	+ 8' 22"
9	Alexander Konychev (ITA)	Team BikeExchange–Jayco	+ 11' 35"
10	Jordi Meeus (BEL)	Bora–Hansgrohe	+ 13' 48"

=== Team classification ===
Final team classification (1–10)
Rank	Team	Time
1	Quick-Step Alpha Vinyl Team	60h 22' 44"
2	Bora–Hansgrohe	+ 41"
3	Team TotalEnergies	+ 45"
4	Team Bahrain Victorious	+ 1' 10"
5	Team BikeExchange–Jayco	+ 2' 45"
6	B&B Hotels–KTM	+ 5' 25"
7	Lotto–Soudal	+ 9' 13"
8	UAE Team Emirates	+ 9' 59"
9	Cofidis	+ 10' 16"
10	Team DSM	+ 13' 28"
