= 2022 UCI World Tour =

Road cycling competitions

2022 UCI WorldTour
- Twelfth edition of the UCI WorldTour

Details
- Dates: 20 February – 8 October
- Location: Canada; Europe; United Arab Emirates
- Races: 31

The 2022 UCI World Tour was a series of races that included thirty-one road cycling events throughout the 2022 cycling season. The tour started with the UAE Tour on 20 February, and concluded with the Il Lombardia on 8 October.

== Events ==
The 2022 calendar was announced in the autumn of 2021.

Races in the 2022 UCI World Tour
Race	Date	Winner	Second	Third
(United Arab Emirates) UAE Tour	20–26 February	Tadej Pogačar (SLO)	Adam Yates (GBR)	Pello Bilbao (ESP)
(Belgium) Omloop Het Nieuwsblad	26 February	Wout van Aert (BEL)	Sonny Colbrelli (ITA)	Greg Van Avermaet (BEL)
(Italy) Strade Bianche	5 March	Tadej Pogačar (SLO)	Alejandro Valverde (ESP)	Kasper Asgreen (DEN)
(France) Paris–Nice	6–13 March	Primož Roglič (SLO)	Simon Yates (GBR)	Daniel Martínez (COL)
(Italy) Tirreno–Adriatico	7–13 March	Tadej Pogačar (SLO)	Jonas Vingegaard (DEN)	Mikel Landa (ESP)
(Italy) Milan–San Remo	19 March	Matej Mohorič (SLO)	Anthony Turgis (FRA)	Mathieu van der Poel (NED)
(Spain) Volta a Catalunya	21–27 March	Sergio Higuita (COL)	Richard Carapaz (ECU)	João Almeida (POR)
(Belgium) Classic Brugge–De Panne	23 March	Tim Merlier (BEL)	Dylan Groenewegen (NED)	Nacer Bouhanni (FRA)
(Belgium) E3 Saxo Bank Classic	25 March	Wout van Aert (BEL)	Christophe Laporte (FRA)	Stefan Küng (SUI)
(Belgium) Gent–Wevelgem	27 March	Biniam Girmay (ERI)	Christophe Laporte (FRA)	Dries Van Gestel (BEL)
(Belgium) Dwars door Vlaanderen	30 March	Mathieu van der Poel (NED)	Tiesj Benoot (BEL)	Tom Pidcock (GBR)
(Belgium) Tour of Flanders	3 April	Mathieu van der Poel (NED)	Dylan van Baarle (NED)	Valentin Madouas (FRA)
(Spain) Tour of the Basque Country	4–9 April	Daniel Martínez (COL)	Ion Izagirre (ESP)	Aleksandr Vlasov (Note: On 1 March 2022, the UCI announced that cyclists from Russia and Belarus would no longer compete under the name or flag of those respective countries due to the Russian invasion of Ukraine.)
(Netherlands) Amstel Gold Race	10 April	Michał Kwiatkowski (POL)	Benoît Cosnefroy (FRA)	Tiesj Benoot (BEL)
(France) Paris–Roubaix	17 April	Dylan van Baarle (NED)	Wout van Aert (BEL)	Stefan Küng (SUI)
(Belgium) La Flèche Wallonne	20 April	Dylan Teuns (BEL)	Alejandro Valverde (ESP)	Aleksandr Vlasov
(Belgium) Liège–Bastogne–Liège	24 April	Remco Evenepoel (BEL)	Quinten Hermans (BEL)	Wout van Aert (BEL)
(Switzerland) Tour de Romandie	26 April – 1 May	Aleksandr Vlasov	Gino Mäder (SUI)	Simon Geschke (GER)
(Germany) Eschborn–Frankfurt	1 May	Sam Bennett (IRL)	Fernando Gaviria (COL)	Alexander Kristoff (NOR)
(Italy) Giro d'Italia	6–29 May	Jai Hindley (AUS)	Richard Carapaz (ECU)	Mikel Landa (ESP)
(France) Critérium du Dauphiné	5–12 June	Primož Roglič (SLO)	Jonas Vingegaard (DEN)	Ben O'Connor (AUS)
(Switzerland) Tour de Suisse	12–19 June	Geraint Thomas (GBR)	Sergio Higuita (COL)	Jakob Fuglsang (DEN)
Tour de France	1–24 July	Jonas Vingegaard (DEN)	Tadej Pogačar (SLO)	Geraint Thomas (GBR)
(Spain) Clásica de San Sebastián	30 July	Remco Evenepoel (BEL)	Pavel Sivakov (FRA)	Tiesj Benoot (BEL)
(Poland) Tour de Pologne	30 July – 5 August	Ethan Hayter (GBR)	Thymen Arensman (NED)	Pello Bilbao (ESP)
(Spain) Vuelta a España	19 August – 11 September	Remco Evenepoel (BEL)	Enric Mas (ESP)	Juan Ayuso (ESP)
(Germany) Hamburg Cyclassics	21 August	Marco Haller (AUT)	Wout van Aert (BEL)	Quinten Hermans (BEL)
Bretagne Classic Ouest–France	28 August	Wout van Aert (BEL)	Axel Laurance (FRA)	Alexander Kamp (DEN)
(Canada) Grand Prix Cycliste de Québec	9 September	Benoît Cosnefroy (FRA)	Michael Matthews (AUS)	Biniam Girmay (ERI)
(Canada) Grand Prix Cycliste de Montréal	11 September	Tadej Pogačar (SLO)	Wout van Aert (BEL)	Andrea Bagioli (ITA)
(Italy) Il Lombardia	8 October	Tadej Pogačar (SLO)	Enric Mas (ESP)	Mikel Landa (ESP)

=== Cancelled events ===
Due to COVID-19-related logistical concerns raised by teams regarding travel to Australia (including strict quarantine requirements), the Tour Down Under (18–23 January) and the Cadel Evans Great Ocean Road Race (30 January) were cancelled. On 8 June 2022, the Benelux Tour (29 August – 4 September) was cancelled due to a pressurised calendar. On 17 June 2022, the Tour of Guangxi (13–18 October) was also cancelled due to travel restrictions caused by the COVID-19 pandemic.

== Teams ==
The eighteen WorldTeams were automatically invited to compete in events, with the top two UCI ProTeams listed on the 2021 UCI World Ranking (Alpecin–Deceuninck and Arkéa–Samsic) also invited automatically. Other teams were invited by the organisers of each race.

- AG2R Citroën Team
- Astana Qazaqstan Team
- Bora–Hansgrohe
- Cofidis
- EF Education–EasyPost
- Groupama–FDJ
- Ineos Grenadiers
- Intermarché–Wanty–Gobert Matériaux
- Israel–Premier Tech
- Lotto–Soudal
- Movistar Team
- Quick-Step Alpha Vinyl Team
- Team Bahrain Victorious
- Team BikeExchange–Jayco
- Team DSM
- Team Jumbo–Visma
- Trek–Segafredo
- UAE Team Emirates
