= 2022 UCI Asia Tour =

- Eighteenth edition of the UCI Asia Tour

Details
- Dates: 6 November 2021 – 15 October 2022
- Location: Asia
- Races: 13

The 2022 UCI Asia Tour is the 18th season of the UCI Asia Tour. The season began on 6 November 2021 with the Giro d'Italia Criterium and ended on 15 October 2022 with Japan Cup Criterium.

The points leader, based on the cumulative results of previous races, wears the UCI Asia Tour cycling jersey.

Throughout the season, points are awarded to the top finishers of stages within stage races and the final general classification standings of each of the stages races and one-day events. The quality and complexity of a race also determines how many points are awarded to the top finishers, the higher the UCI rating of a race, the more points are awarded.

The UCI ratings from highest to lowest are as follows:

- Multi-day events: 2.Pro, 2.1 and 2.2
- One-day events: 1.Pro, 1.1 and 1.2

== Events ==
Races in the 2022 UCI Asia Tour
Race	Rating	Date	Winner	Team
(United Arab Emirates) Giro d'Italia Criterium	CRTP - Pro Criterium	6 November 2021	Peter Sagan (SVK)	Bora–Hansgrohe
Tour of Thailand	2.1	1–6 December 2021	Jambaljamts Sainbayar (MGL)	Terengganu Cycling Team
(United Arab Emirates) Tour of Sharjah	2.2	28 January – 1 February	Grega Bole (SLO)	Shabab Al Ahli Cycling Team
(Saudi Arabia) Saudi Tour	2.1	1–5 February	Maxim Van Gils (BEL)	Lotto–Soudal
Tour of Thailand	2.1	1–6 April	Alan Banaszek (POL)	HRE Mazowsze Serce Polski
Tour of Japan	2.2	15–22 May	Nathan Earle (AUS)	Team Ukyo
(Japan) Tour de Kumano	2.2	27–29 May	Nathan Earle (AUS)	Team Ukyo
(China) Tour of Qinghai Lake	2.2	27 July–3 August	Jiankun Liu (CHN)	Pingtan International Tourism Island Cycling Team
(Japan) Tour de Hokkaido	2.2	9–11 September	Yusuke Kadota (JPN)	EF Education–Nippo Development Team
Tour of Iran	2.1	29 September–3 October	Gianni Marchand (BEL)	Tarteletto–Isorex
(Japan) Oita Ikoinomichi Criterium	CRTP - Pro Criterium	1 October	Keitaro Sawada (JPN)	Sparkle Ōita Racing Team
(Japan) Oita Urban Classic	1.2	2 October	Ryuki Uga (JPN)	Team Ukyo
(Chinese Taipei) Tour de Taiwan	2.1	2–6 October	Ben Dyball (AUS)	Team Ukyo
(Syria) International Syrian Tour	2.2	4–8 October	Hamza Amari (ALG)	Algeria (national team)
Japan Cup Criterium	CRTP - Pro Criterium	15 October	Edward Theuns (BEL)	Trek–Segafredo
