= List of riders with stage wins at all three cycling Grand Tours =

The Grand Tours are the three most prestigious multi-week stage races in professional road bicycle racing. The competitions are the Giro d'Italia, Tour de France and Vuelta a España, contested annually in that order. They are the only stage races permitted to last longer than 14 days.

The Giro d'Italia, Tour de France, and Vuelta a España are collectively known as the Grand Tours of cycling. The oldest of the races, the Tour, began in 1903, while the Giro first started in 1909 and the Vuelta in 1935. The modern editions of the races all consist of 21 days of racing with two rest days spread throughout race calendar, giving riders at most 63 chances to win a stage in a Grand Tour each year.

Winning a stage in a Grand Tour is a significant achievement and winning a stage in each Grand Tour is a rare feat that only 116 riders have achieved in their careers. Fiorenzo Magni was the first rider to win a stage in each Grand Tour with his victory in the stage 7 individual time trial at the 1955 Vuelta a España. The most recent rider to accomplish this task was Sepp Kuss after he won stage 19 of the 2026 Giro d'Italia.

Cyclists are ranked on the basis of their total stage wins in the three Grand Tours. When there is a tie between cyclists they are listed alphabetically. The majority of stage winners across the three tours have come from Europe, however, there have been a few non-European cyclists who have accomplished this feat. Colombian Luis Herrera was the first non-European rider to win a stage in each of the Grand Tours when he completed the triple with his victory in stage 13 at the 1989 Giro d'Italia. The first North American to complete this feat was Tyler Hamilton, but he was later stripped of his stage win at the 2004 Vuelta a España. American Tyler Farrar became the only other North American to do so with his victory in stage 3 of the 2011 Tour de France. Simon Gerrans became the first person from the Southern Hemisphere to win a stage at each Grand Tour with his victory at the 2009 Vuelta a España in tenth leg. Djamolidine Abdoujaparov is the only Asian cyclist on the list.

Eddy Merckx, with 64 victories, has won the most stages at the Grand Tours. Mario Cipollini is second with 57, Mark Cavendish is third with 55. Cavendish has won the most Tour stages with 35, while Cipollini leads the tally for career stage wins at the Giro d'Italia with 42 to his name. Delio Rodríguez has the most stage wins in the history of the Vuelta a España (39 stages) but he failed to win any stages in the Tour de France or Giro d'Italia and is thus not represented in this list.

== List ==
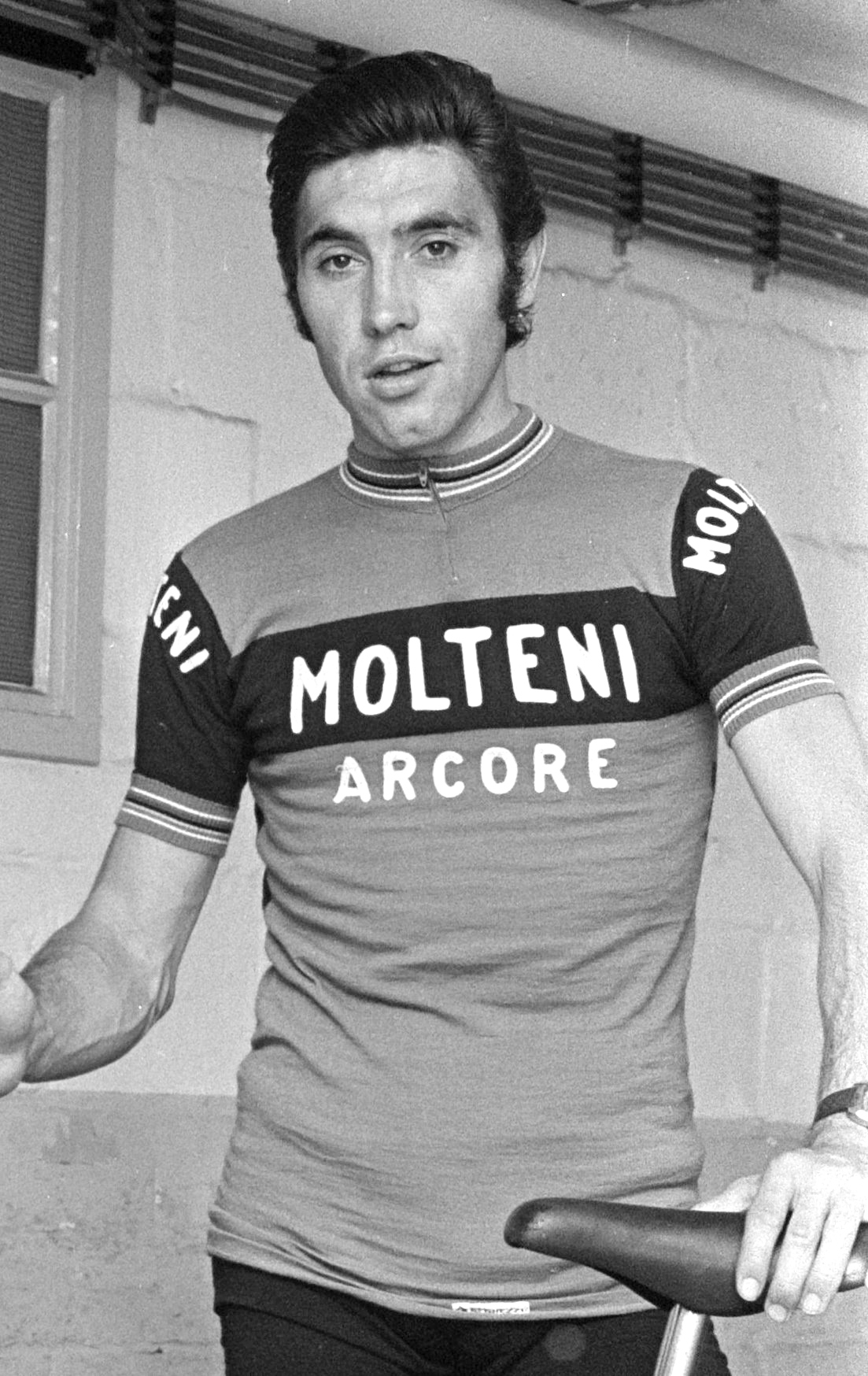
Eddy Merckx won 64 stages between the Grand Tours during his racing years.

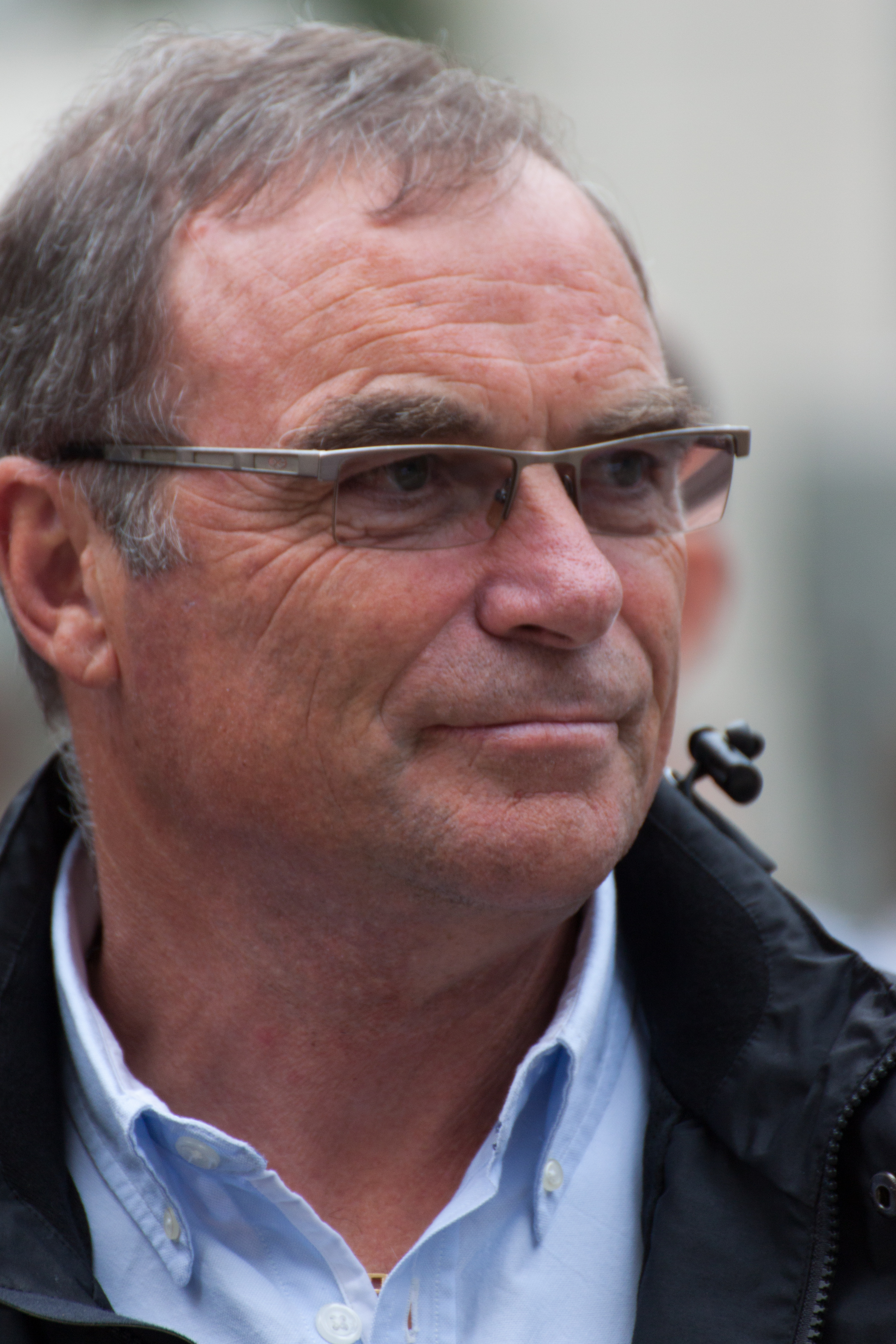
Bernard Hinault won 41 stages at the Grand Tours between the years 1978 and 1986.

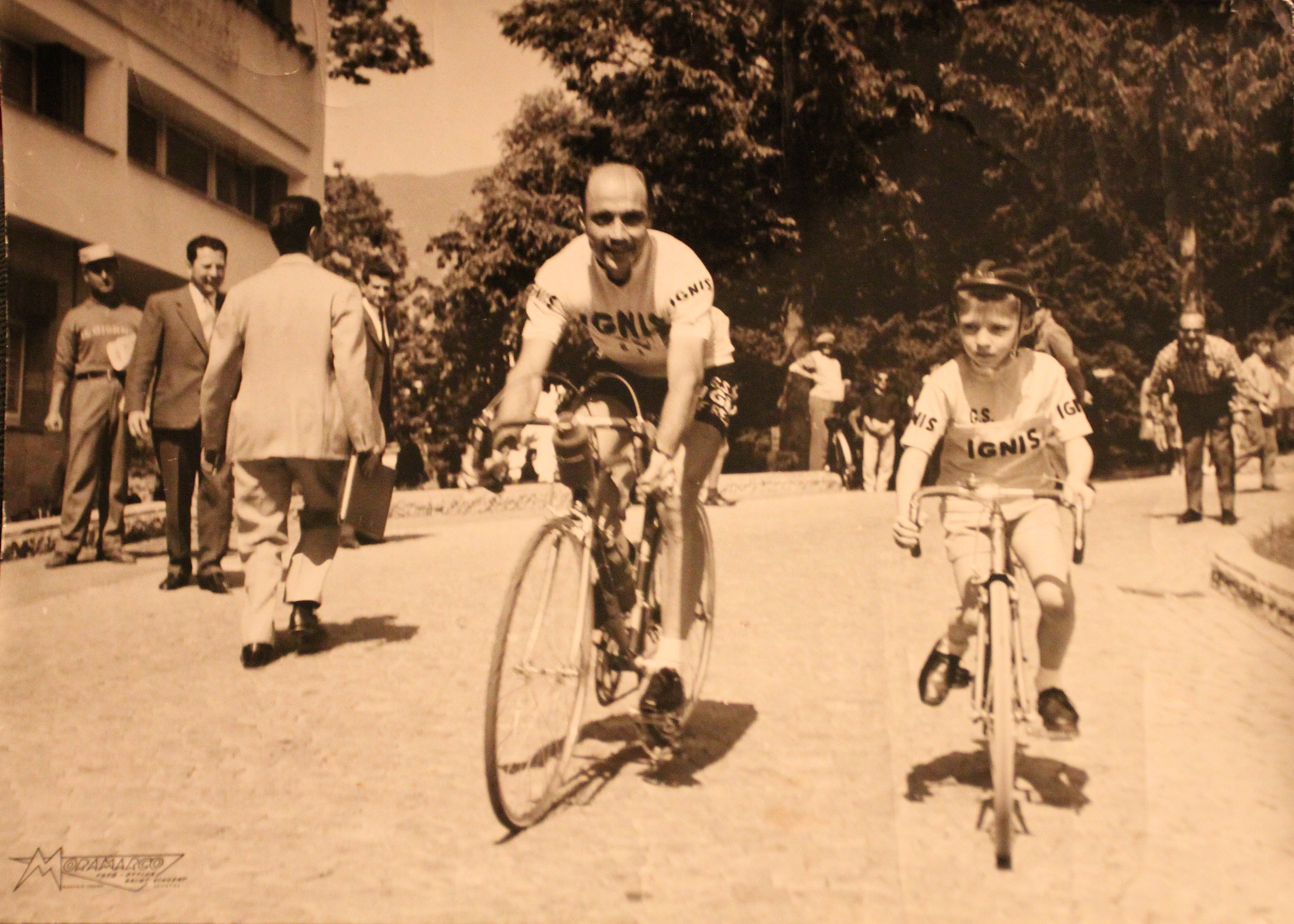
Miguel Poblet (center) won 26 stages between all three Grand Tours during his professional racing career.

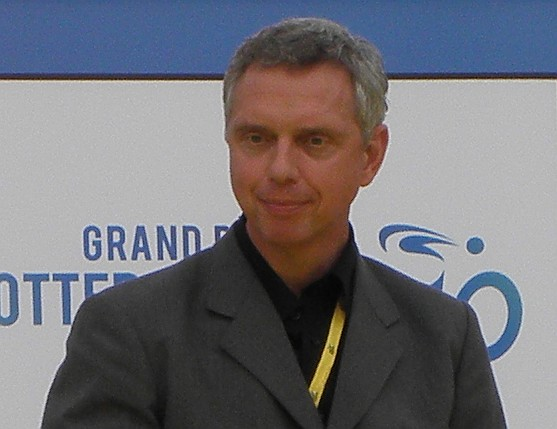
Jean-Paul van Poppel won a total of 22 stages at the Grand Tours.

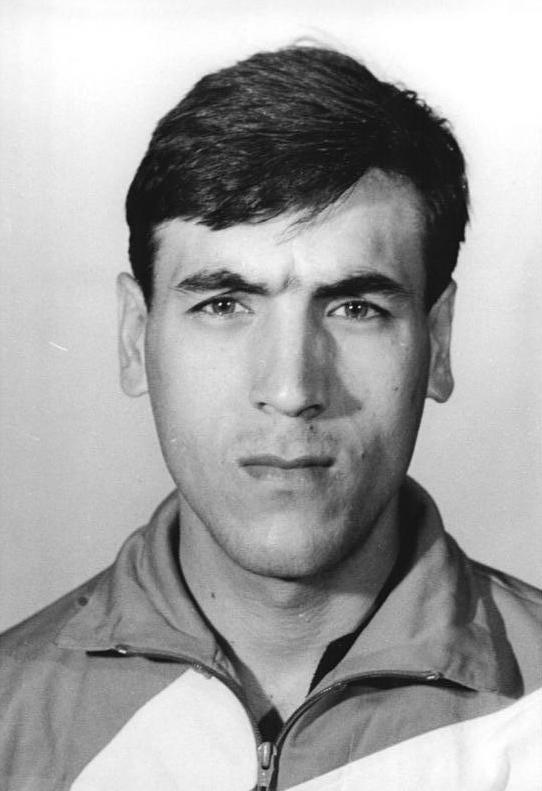
Djamolidine Abdoujaparov won seventeen stages between the Grand Tour races that he competed in during his cycling career.

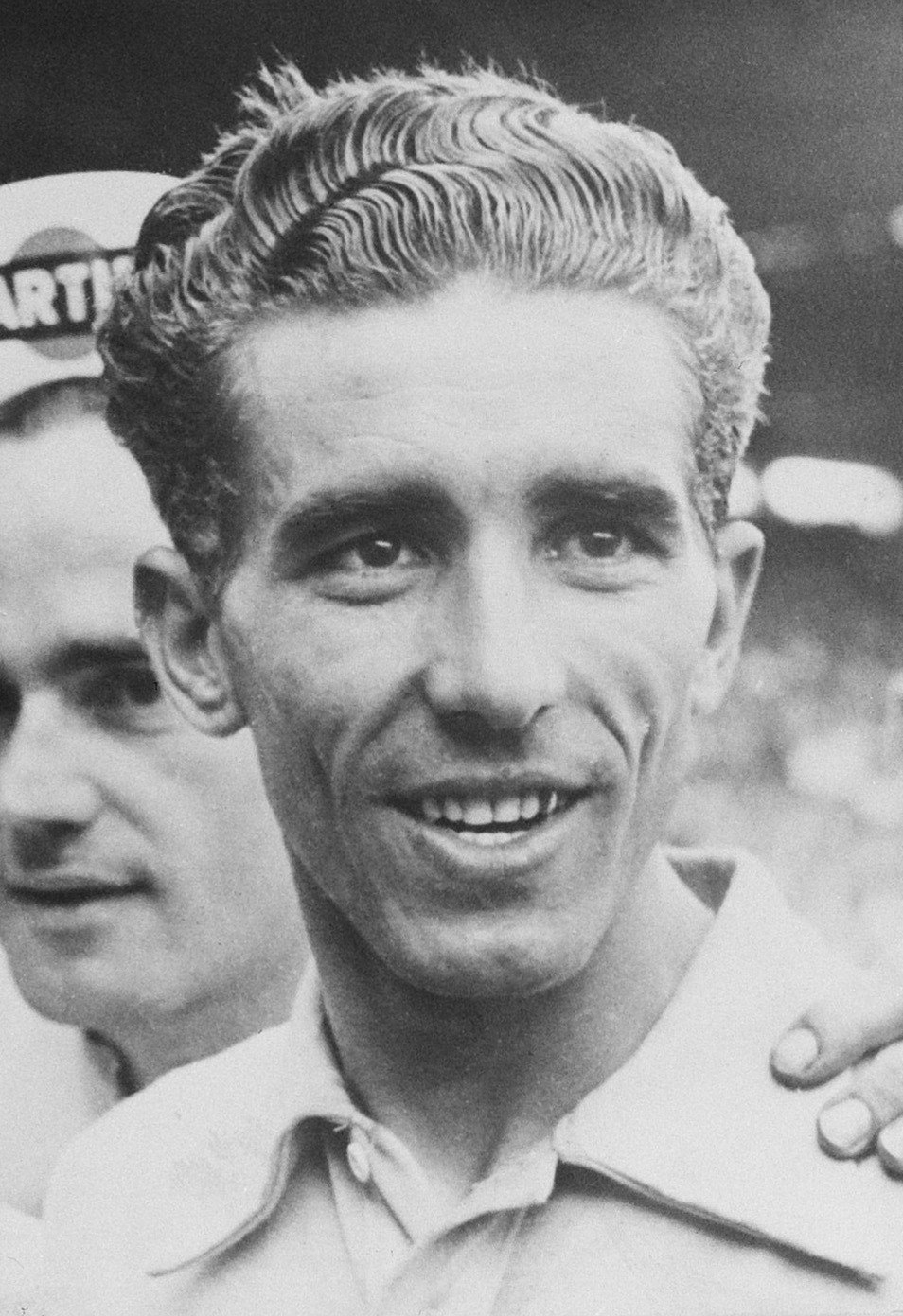
Federico Bahamontes won a total of eleven stages at the Grand Tours between the years 1957 and 1964.

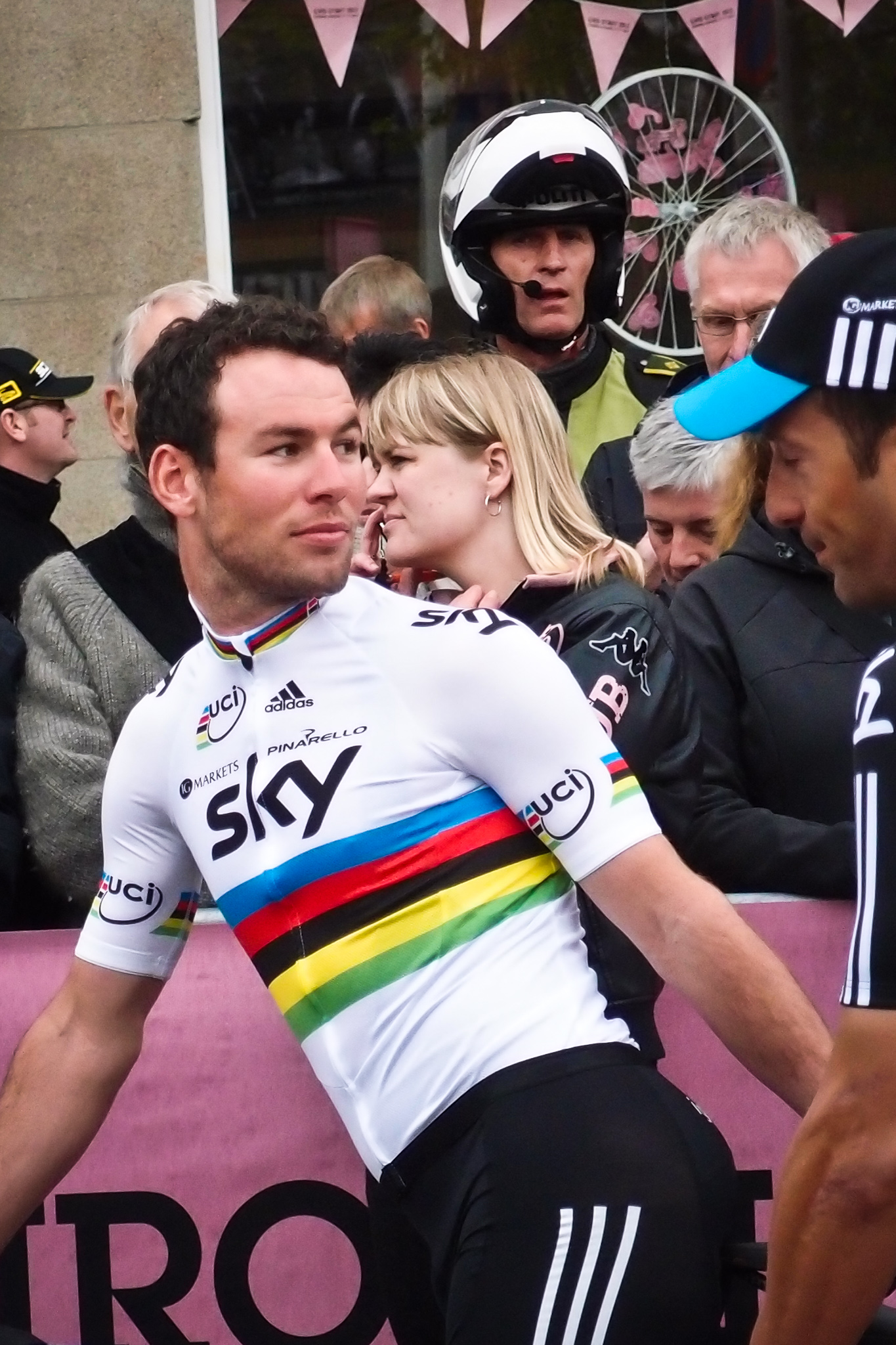
Mark Cavendish ranks third overall with 55 Grand Tour stage wins between 2008 and 2024, including a record 35 stages at the Tour de France

Riders in bold are still active. An asterisk denotes cyclists who have won an ITT in each race.

Riders who have won a stage in each Grand Tour
Rank	Cyclist	Country	Winning span	Giro	Tour	Vuelta	Total	Ref(s)
1	Eddy Merckx*	Belgium	1967–1975	24	34	6	64	
2	Mario Cipollini	Italy	1989–2003	42	12	3	57	
3	Mark Cavendish	United Kingdom	2008–2024	17	35	3	55	
4	Alessandro Petacchi	Italy	2000–2011	22	6	20	48	
5	Bernard Hinault*	France	1978–1986	6	28	7	41	
6	**Tadej Pogačar***	Slovenia	2019–2026	6	26	6	38	
7	Rik Van Looy	Belgium	1958–1969	12	7	18	37	
8	Freddy Maertens*	Belgium	1976–1981	7	15	13	35	
9	Marino Basso	Italy	1966–1977	15	6	6	27	
9	Francesco Moser*	Italy	1973–1986	23	2	2	27	
11	Guido Bontempi	Italy	1981–1993	16	6	4	26	
11	Miguel Poblet	Spain	1955–1961	20	3	3	26	
13	Laurent Jalabert	France	1992–2001	3	4	18	25	
13	Rik Van Steenbergen	Belgium	1949–1957	15	4	6	25	
15	Roger De Vlaeminck	Belgium	1970–1984	22	1	1	24	
16	Jacques Anquetil*	France	1957–1964	6	16	1	23	
17	André Greipel	Germany	2008–2017	7	11	4	22	
17	**Primož Roglič**	Slovenia	2016–2024	4	3	15	22	
17	Jean-Paul van Poppel	Netherlands	1986–1994	4	9	9	22	
20	Gerben Karstens	Netherlands	1965–1976	1	6	14	21	
20	Tony Rominger*	Switzerland	1988–1996	5	3	13	21	
22	Marcel Kittel	Germany	2011–2017	4	14	1	19	
23	Rudi Altig	Germany	1962–1969	4	8	6	18	
23	Nino Defilippis	Italy	1952–1964	9	7	2	18	
23	Peter Sagan	Slovakia	2011–2021	2	12	4	18	
26	Djamolidine Abdoujaparov	Uzbekistan	1991–1996	1	9	7	17	
26	Alejandro Valverde	Spain	2003–2019	1	4	12	17	
28	Fiorenzo Magni	Italy	1948–1955	6	7	3	16	
28	**Wout van Aert**	Belgium	2019–2026	1	10	5	16	
30	Gianni Bugno	Italy	1988–1998	9	4	2	15	
30	Rik Van Linden	Belgium	1972–1978	9	4	2	15	
32	Chris Froome	United Kingdom	2011–2018	2	7	5	14	
32	José Manuel Fuente	Spain	1971–1974	9	2	3	14	
32	Felice Gimondi*	Italy	1965–1976	6	7	1	14	
32	Thor Hushovd	Norway	2002–2011	1	10	3	14	
32	Vincenzo Nibali	Italy	2010–2019	7	6	1	14	
32	Joaquim Rodríguez	Spain	2003–2015	2	3	9	14	
32	**Jonas Vingegaard**	Denmark	2022–2026	5	4	5	14	
32	Marcel Wüst	Germany	1995–2000	1	1	12	14	
32	Alex Zülle*	Switzerland	1993–2000	3	2	9	14	
41	Pierino Baffi	Italy	1955–1963	4	5	4	13	
41	Laurent Fignon	France	1983–1992	2	9	2	13	
41	Walter Godefroot	Belgium	1967–1975	1	10	2	13	
41	Hugo Koblet	Switzerland	1950–1956	7	5	1	13	
41	Eddy Planckaert	Belgium	1981–1989	1	2	10	13	
41	Guido Reybrouck	Belgium	1965–1970	3	6	4	13	
41	Dietrich Thurau*	Germany	1976–1979	2	6	5	13	
48	**John Degenkolb**	Germany	2012–2018	1	1	10	12	
48	Julio Jiménez	Spain	1964–1968	4	5	3	12	
48	Nicola Minali	Italy	1994–1998	2	3	7	12	
48	**Mads Pedersen**	Denmark	2022–2026	5	3	4	12	
52	Federico Bahamontes	Spain	1957–1964	1	7	3	11	
52	Daniele Bennati	Italy	2007–2012	3	2	6	11	
52	Jeroen Blijlevens	Netherlands	1995–1999	2	4	5	11	
52	**Remco Evenepoel***	Belgium	2022–2026	2	4	5	11	
52	Caleb Ewan	Australia	2015–2021	5	5	1	11	
52	Philippe Gilbert	Belgium	2009–2019	3	1	7	11	
52	Miguel María Lasa	Spain	1970–1981	3	2	6	11	
52	Gilberto Simoni	Italy	2000–2007	8	1	2	11	
52	Ján Svorada	Czech Republic	1994–2001	5	3	3	11	
52	Lucien Van Impe	Belgium	1972–1983	1	9	1	11	
52	Simon Yates	United Kingdom	2016–2025	6	3	2	11	
63	**Sam Bennett**	(Republic of Ireland) Ireland	2018–2022	3	2	5	10	
63	**Richard Carapaz**	Ecuador	2018–2026	4	3	3	10	
63	Guido Carlesi	Italy	1958–1965	7	2	1	10	
63	**Kaden Groves**	Australia	2022–2025	2	1	7	10	
63	**Michael Matthews**	Australia	2013–2023	3	4	3	10	
63	David Millar*	United Kingdom	2000–2012	1	4	5	10	
63	Edward Sels	Belgium	1964–1969	1	7	2	10	
63	Jean Stablinski	France	1957–1967	2	5	3	10	
71	**Magnus Cort**	Denmark	2016–2023	1	2	6	9	
71	Tom Dumoulin*	Netherlands	2015–2018	4	3	2	9	
71	Dimitri Konyshev	Russia	1990–2000	4	4	1	9	
71	Denis Menchov	Russia	2004–2012	3	1	5	9	
71	Elia Viviani	Italy	2015–2019	5	1	3	9	
76	Julian Alaphilippe	France	2017–2024	1	6	1	8	
76	Fabio Baldato	Italy	1993–2003	4	2	2	8	
76	Jean-François Bernard*	France	1986–1990	4	3	1	8	
76	Paolo Bettini	Italy	2000–2008	2	1	5	8	
76	Luis Herrera	Colombia	1984–1992	3	3	2	8	
76	Marino Lejarreta	Spain	1982–1991	2	1	5	8	
76	Thierry Marie*	France	1986–1992	1	6	1	8	
76	Nairo Quintana	Colombia	2013–2019	3	3	2	8	
76	**Matteo Trentin**	Italy	2013–2019	1	3	4	8	
85	Erik Breukink	Netherlands	1987–1992	2	4	1	7	
85	Aitor González	Spain	2002–2004	3	1	3	7	
85	Ercole Gualazzini	Italy	1969–1977	4	2	1	7	
85	Bernardo Ruiz	Spain	1948–1955	1	2	4	7	
89	Fabio Aru	Italy	2014–2017	3	1	2	6	
89	Giovanni Battaglin	Italy	1975–1981	4	1	1	6	
89	Rino Benedetti	Italy	1952–1962	4	1	1	6	
89	Laudelino Cubino	Spain	1987–1995	2	1	3	6	
89	Tyler Farrar	United States	2009–2011	2	1	3	6	
89	Massimo Ghirotto	Italy	1988–1994	3	2	1	6	
89	Charly Mottet	France	1986–1991	1	3	2	6	
89	Thibaut Pinot	France	2012–2019	1	3	2	6	
89	Michel Pollentier*	Belgium	1974–1984	1	3	2	6	
98	Thomas De Gendt	Belgium	2012–2022	2	2	1	5	
98	Pablo Lastras	Spain	2001–2011	1	1	3	5	
98	Vicente López Carril	Spain	1971–1976	1	3	1	5	
98	Dan Martin	(Republic of Ireland) Ireland	2011–2021	1	2	2	5	
98	Robert Millar	United Kingdom	1983–1989	1	3	1	5	
98	**Matej Mohorič**	Slovenia	2017–2023	1	3	1	5	
98	Serguei Outschakov	Ukraine	1993–1999	2	1	2	5	
98	Jesper Skibby	Denmark	1989–1995	1	1	3	5	
98	**Tim Wellens**	Belgium	2016–2025	2	1	2	5	
107	Rohan Dennis*	Australia	2015–2018	1	1	2	4	
107	Shay Elliott	(Republic of Ireland) Ireland	1960–1963	1	1	2	4	
107	Simon Gerrans	Australia	2008–2013	1	2	1	4	
107	Ion Izagirre	Spain	2012–2023	1	2	1	4	
107	**Sepp Kuss**	United States	2019–2026	1	1	2	4	
107	**Ben O'Connor**	Australia	2020–2025	1	2	1	4	
107	Oliverio Rincón	Colombia	1993–1996	1	1	2	4	
107	Rigoberto Urán	Colombia	2013–2022	2	1	1	4	
115	Juan Manuel Gárate	Spain	2001–2009	1	1	1	3	
115	**Lennard Kämna**	Germany	2020–2023	1	1	1	3	

== Calendar year ==
An ever rarer accomplishment is to win a stage at all the Grand Tours in one single calendar year. This feat has only been accomplished by three riders in history. The first rider was Spain's Miguel Poblet who won a total of eight stages at all three Grand Tours in 1956. Two years later, Pierino Baffi won six stages between all three Grand Tours. The third, and most recent, rider was Italian cyclist Alessandro Petacchi who won fifteen stages at the Grand Tours in 2003.

Riders who have won a stage in each Grand Tour in a single year
Year	Cyclist	Country	Giro stage wins	Tour stage wins	Vuelta stage wins	Total	Ref(s)
1956	Miguel Poblet	Spain	4	1	3	8	
1958	Pierino Baffi	Italy	1	3	2	6	
2003	Alessandro Petacchi	Italy	6	4	5	15	

== Doping ==
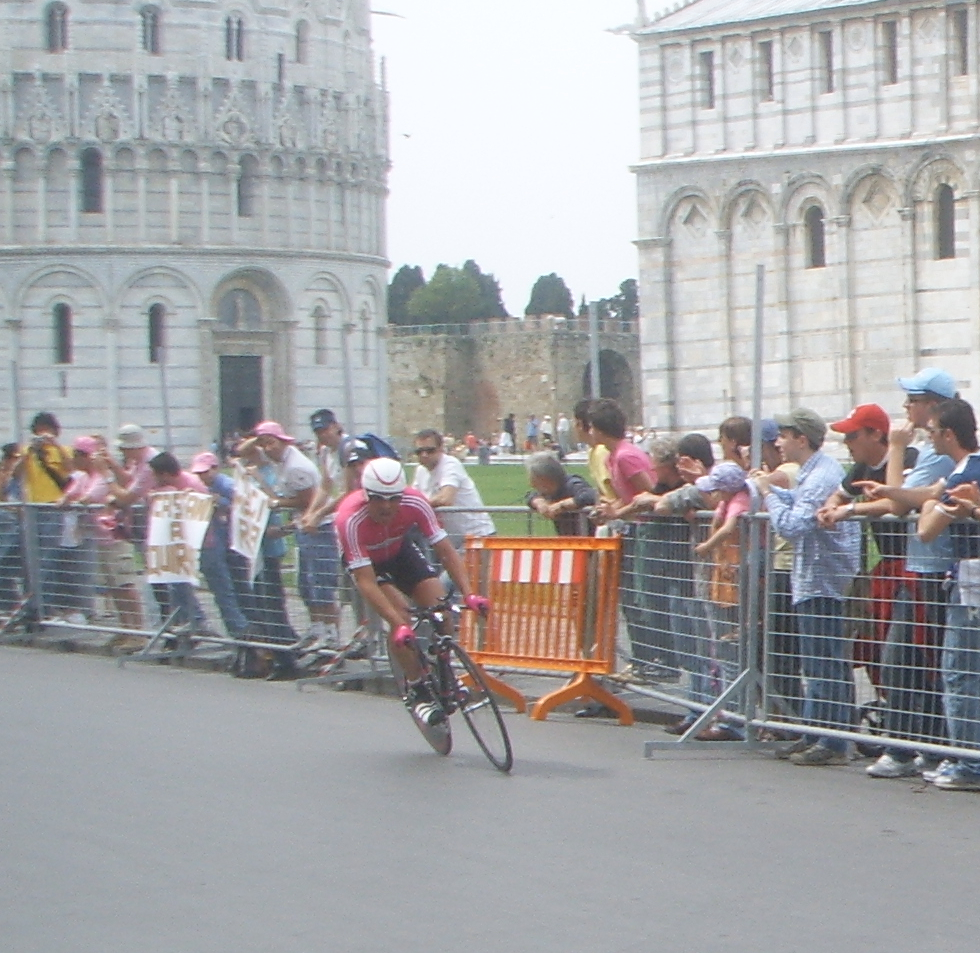
Jan Ullrich (pictured in Pisa during his winning time trial at the 2006 Giro) and Alberto Contador retroactively lost their place on the all-time list after being stripped of their Giro stage wins.

Five more riders (David Zabriskie, Jan Ullrich, Leonardo Piepoli, Tyler Hamilton and Alberto Contador) have won stages in all three Grand Tours, but all were retroactively stripped of stage wins.

- Jan Ullrich won seven individual stages at the Tour de France during his career and two stages in the 1999 Vuelta a España. He won an individual time trial at the 2006 Giro d'Italia but was later stripped of his results from May 2005 to June 2006 by the Court of Arbitration for Sport for his involvement in the Operación Puerto doping case.
- Alberto Contador is one of eight riders who won the general classification at all Grand Tours. Contador won two stages and the general classification of the 2011 Giro d'Italia, but lost his 2011 results due to a positive test for clenbuterol in the 2010 Tour de France. The CAS initially suspended Contador on 25 January 2011, but he appealed the decision, allowing him to compete in the 2011 Giro d'Italia and Tour de France. He lost his appeal on 6 February 2012 and was given a two-year ban with retroactive effect, starting from the day of his positive doping test on 21 July 2010, and was thereby stripped of his Giro results. Contador also won the Giro d'Italia in 2008 and 2015, but did so without winning a stage on both occasions.
