= List of Grand Tour points classification winners =

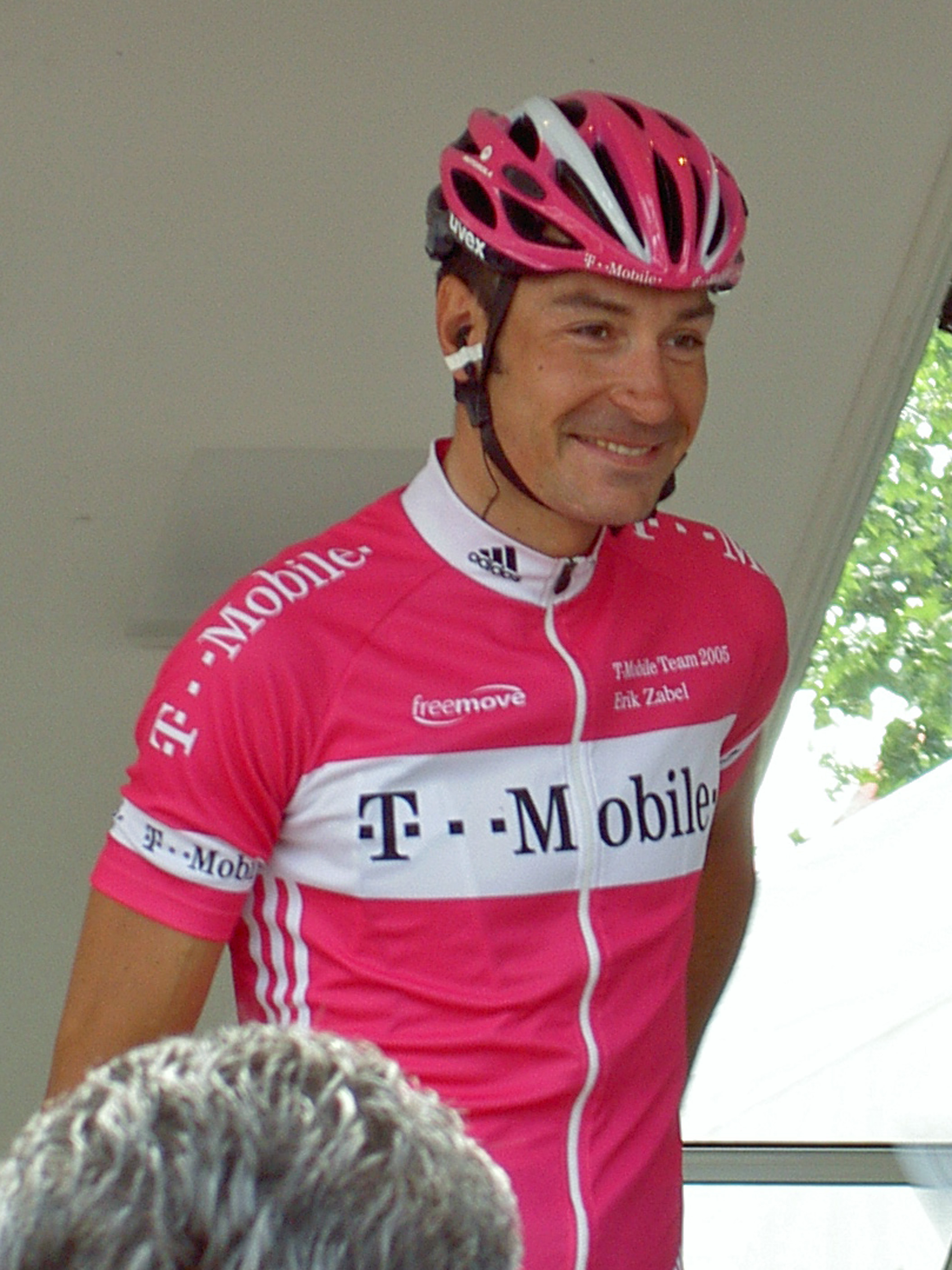
Erik Zabel has won the most points classifications at the Grand Tour races, with nine to his credit.

The Grand Tours are the three most prestigious multi-week stage races in professional road bicycle racing. The competitions are the Giro d'Italia, Tour de France and Vuelta a España, contested annually in that order. They are the only stage races permitted to last longer than 14 days. No cyclist has won all three Grand Tours's points classifications in the same year; the only cyclists to win all three Grand Tours's points classifications in their career are Djamolidine Abdoujaparov, Mark Cavendish, Laurent Jalabert, Eddy Merckx, Alessandro Petacchi, and Mads Pedersen. It is rare for cyclists to ride all Grand Tours in the same year; in 2004, 474 cyclists started in one of the Grand Tours, 68 rode two and two cyclists started all three.

Cyclists are ranked on the basis of their total wins in the three Grand Tours. When there is a tie between cyclists they are listed alphabetically by the Grand Tour they won. The majority of winners have come from Europe, however there have been a few notable victories for cyclists from other continents. Abdoujaparov, of Uzbekistan, won five points classifications. The only other non-European country to win a points classification at a Grand Tour is Australia, who have won five between three riders.

Erik Zabel, with 9 victories, has won the most points classifications at the Grand Tours. Sean Kelly is second with 8 and Laurent Jalabert is third with seven. Zabel held the record for the most points classifications at the Tour with six, until being surpassed by Peter Sagan in 2019. Francesco Moser and Giuseppe Saronni share the record of four points classifications at the Giro. While, Kelly and Jalabert both have four victories in the points classification at the Vuelta.

== Winners ==
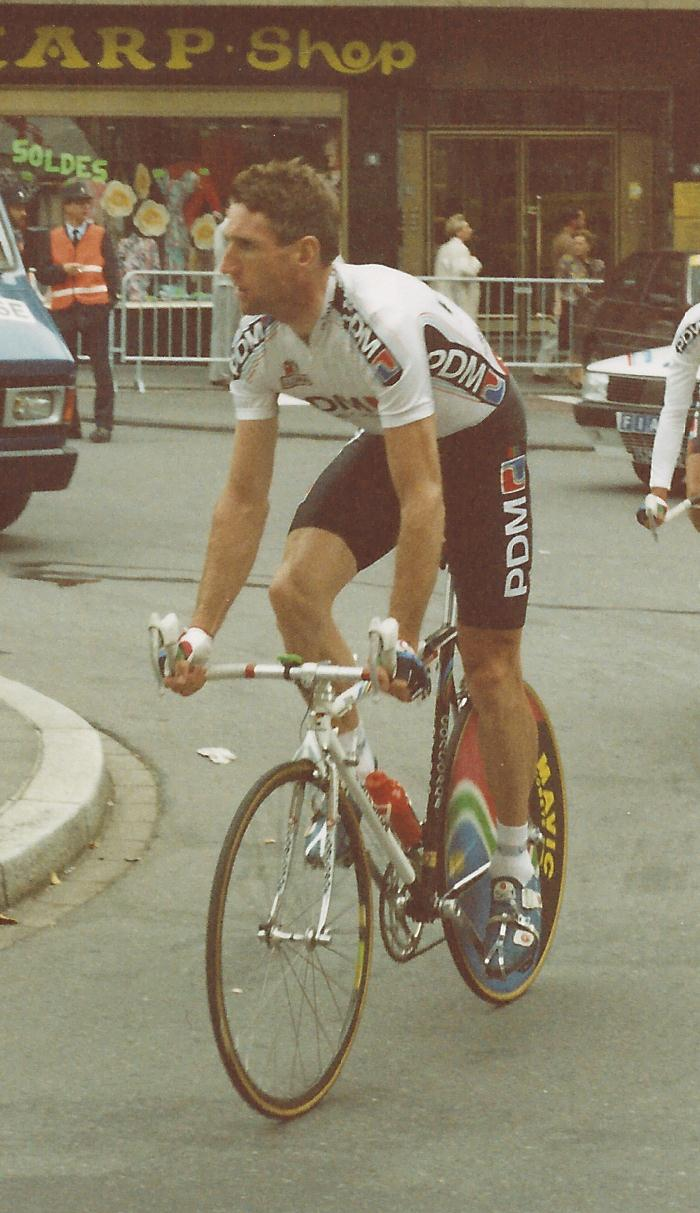
Sean Kelly won a total of eight points classifications at the Grand Tours during his career.

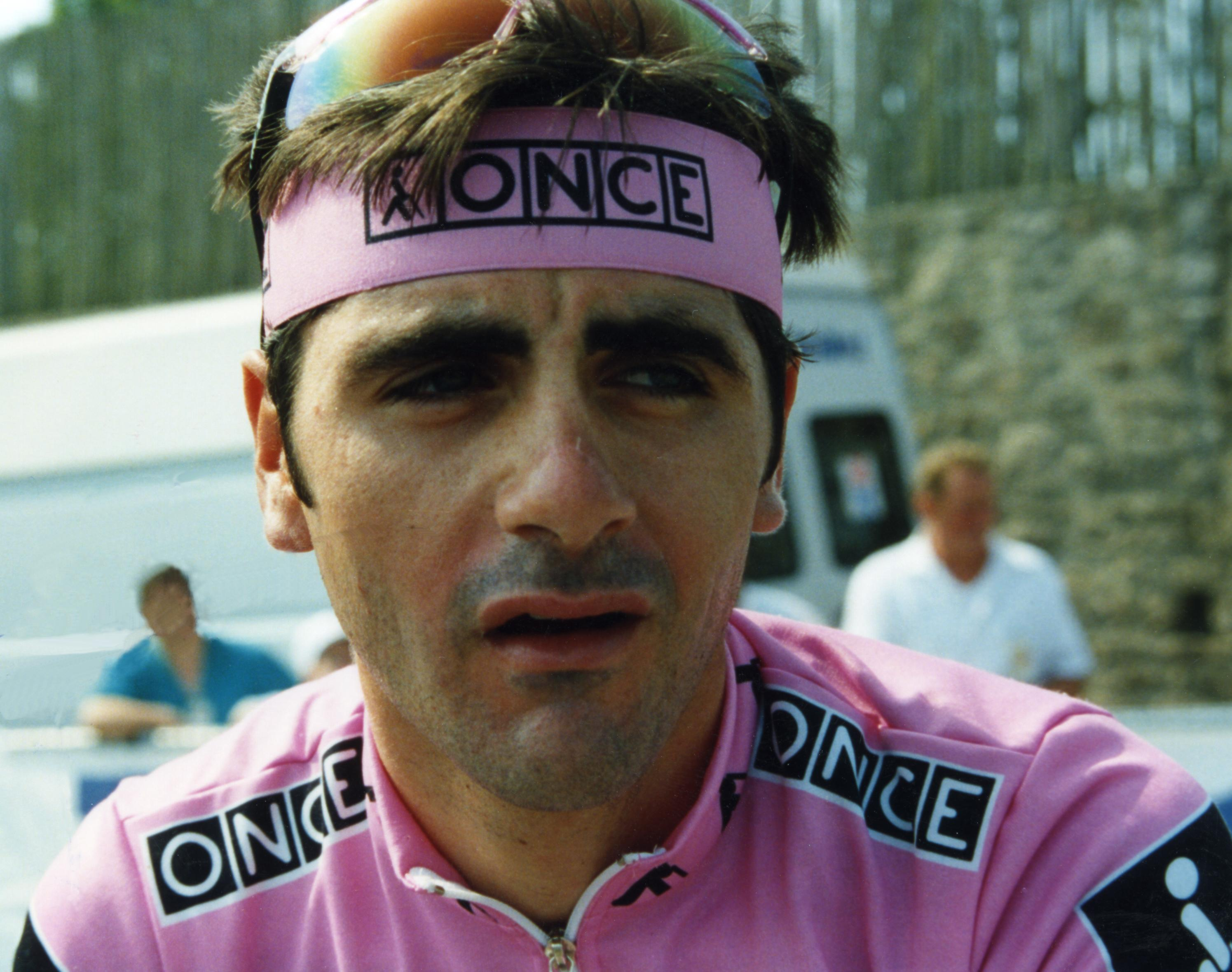
Laurent Jalabert won seven points classifications at the Grand Tour races he competed in.

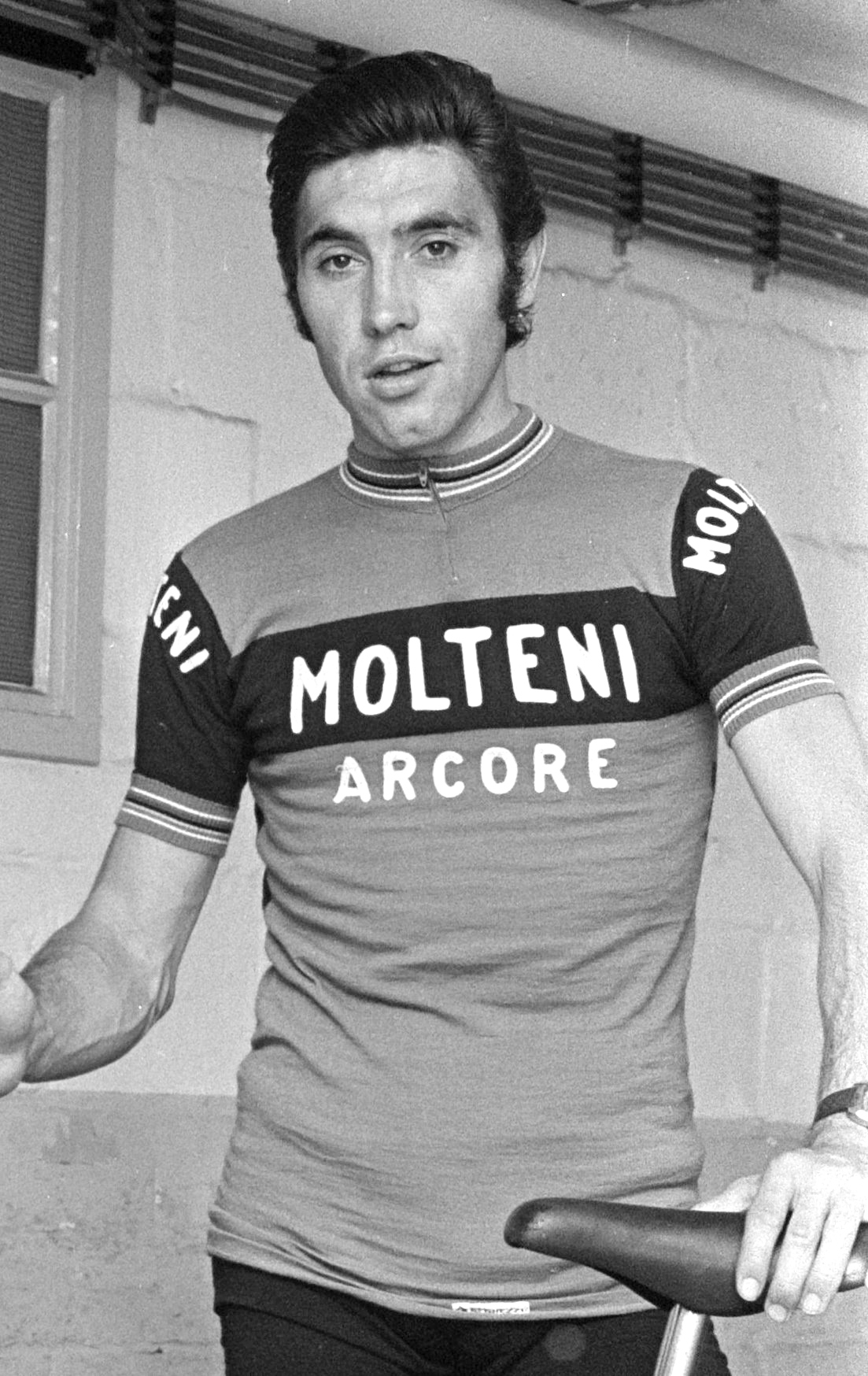
Eddy Merckx won six Grand Tour points classifications.

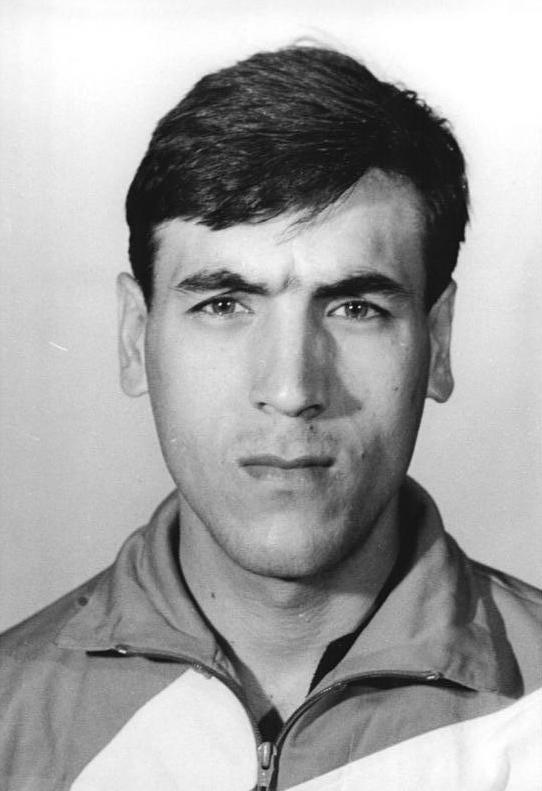
Djamolidine Abdoujaparov won five points classification at Grand Tour races in his career.

=== By cyclist ===
Riders in bold are still active. Number of wins in gold indicates the current record holder(s).

Grand Tour points classification winners
Rank	Cyclist	Country	Winning span	Giro	Tour	Vuelta	Total
1	Erik Zabel	Germany	1996–2004	0	6	3	9
2	Peter Sagan	Slovakia	2012–2021	1	**7**	0	8
2	Sean Kelly	(Republic of Ireland) Ireland	1980–1989	0	4	**4**	8
4	Laurent Jalabert	France	1992–1999	1	2	**4**	7
5	Eddy Merckx	Belgium	1968–1973	2	3	1	6
6	Djamolidine Abdoujaparov	Soviet Union/Uzbekistan	1991–1994	1	3	1	5
6	Jan Janssen	Netherlands	1964–1968	0	3	2	5
8	Francesco Moser	Italy	1976–1982	**4**	0	0	4
8	Giuseppe Saronni	Italy	1979–1983	**4**	0	0	4
8	Mark Cavendish	(United Kingdom) Great Britain	2010–2021	1	2	1	4
8	Freddy Maertens	Belgium	1976–1981	0	3	1	4
8	Alejandro Valverde	Spain	2012–2018	0	0	**4**	4
8	**Mads Pedersen**	Denmark	2022–2026	1	1	2	4
14	Mario Cipollini	Italy	1992–2002	3	0	0	3
14	Roger De Vlaeminck	Belgium	1972–1975	3	0	0	3
14	Johan Van Der Velde	Netherlands	1985–1988	3	0	0	3
14	Franco Bitossi	Italy	1968–1970	2	1	0	3
14	**Jonathan Milan**	Italy	2023–2025	2	1	0	3
14	Alessandro Petacchi	Italy	2004–2010	1	1	1	3
14	Robbie McEwen	Australia	2002–2006	0	3	0	3
14	Thor Hushovd	Norway	2005–2009	0	2	1	3
14	Rik Van Looy	Belgium	1959–1965	0	1	2	3
23	Paolo Bettini	Italy	2005–2006	2	0	0	2
23	**Giacomo Nizzolo**	Italy	2015–2016	2	0	0	2
23	**Arnaud Démare**	France	2020–2022	2	0	0	2
23	Tony Rominger	Switzerland	1993–1995	1	0	1	2
23	Fabrizio Guidi	Italy	1996–1998	1	0	1	2
23	Daniele Bennati	Italy	2007–2008	1	0	1	2
23	André Darrigade	France	1959–1961	0	2	0	2
23	Jean Graczyk	France	1958–1960	0	2	0	2
23	Stan Ockers	Belgium	1955–1956	0	2	0	2
23	Rudi Altig	West Germany	1962	0	1	1	2
23	**Wout van Aert**	Belgium	2022–2026	0	1	1	2
23	**Kaden Groves**	Australia	2023–2024	0	0	2	2
23	Domingo Perurena	Spain	1972–1974	0	0	2	2
23	Uwe Raab	East Germany/ Germany	1990–1991	0	0	2	2
23	**Primož Roglič**	Slovenia	2019–2020	0	0	2	2
38	**Pascal Ackermann**	Germany	2019	1	0	0	1
38	Adriano Baffi	Italy	1993	1	0	0	1
38	Marino Basso	Italy	1971	1	0	0	1
38	Guido Bontempi	Italy	1986	1	0	0	1
38	Nacer Bouhanni	France	2014	1	0	0	1
38	Gianni Bugno	Italy	1990	1	0	0	1
38	Claudio Chiappucci	Italy	1991	1	0	0	1
38	Cadel Evans	Australia	2010	1	0	0	1
38	Giovanni Fidanza	Italy	1989	1	0	0	1
38	Urs Freuler	Switzerland	1984	1	0	0	1
38	**Fernando Gaviria**	Colombia	2017	1	0	0	1
38	Dmitri Konyshev	Russia	2000	1	0	0	1
38	**Paul Magnier**	France	2026	1	0	0	1
38	Denis Menchov	Russia	2009	1	0	0	1
38	Gianni Motta	Italy	1966	1	0	0	1
38	Mariano Piccoli	Italy	1998	1	0	0	1
38	Joaquim Rodríguez	Spain	2012	1	0	0	1
38	Michele Scarponi	Italy	2011	1	0	0	1
38	Gilberto Simoni	Italy	2003	1	0	0	1
38	Massimo Strazzer	Italy	2001	1	0	0	1
38	Elia Viviani	Italy	2018	1	0	0	1
38	Dino Zandegù	Italy	1967	1	0	0	1
38	**Sam Bennett**	(Republic of Ireland) Ireland	2020	0	1	0	1
38	Tom Boonen	Belgium	2007	0	1	0	1
38	Baden Cooke	Australia	2003	0	1	0	1
38	Jacques Esclassan	France	1977	0	1	0	1
38	Jean Forestier	France	1957	0	1	0	1
38	Óscar Freire	Spain	2008	0	1	0	1
38	**Biniam Girmay**	Eritrea	2024	0	1	0	1
38	Walter Godefroot	Belgium	1970	0	1	0	1
38	Bernard Hinault	France	1979	0	1	0	1
38	Frank Hoste	Belgium	1984	0	1	0	1
38	Ferdinand Kübler	Switzerland	1954	0	1	0	1
38	Olaf Ludwig	Germany	1990	0	1	0	1
38	**Michael Matthews**	Australia	2017	0	1	0	1
38	Rudy Pevenage	Belgium	1980	0	1	0	1
38	**Jasper Philipsen**	Belgium	2023	0	1	0	1
38	Eddy Planckaert	Belgium	1988	0	1	0	1
38	Willy Planckaert	Belgium	1966	0	1	0	1
38	Fritz Schär	Switzerland	1953	0	1	0	1
38	Patrick Sercu	Belgium	1974	0	1	0	1
38	Rik Van Linden	Belgium	1975	0	1	0	1
38	Jean-Paul van Poppel	Netherlands	1987	0	1	0	1
38	Herman Van Springel	Belgium	1973	0	1	0	1
38	Eric Vanderaerden	Belgium	1986	0	1	0	1
38	Salvador Botella	Spain	1958	0	0	1	1
38	Francisco Javier Cedena	Spain	1981	0	0	1	1
38	Arthur Decabooter	Belgium	1960	0	0	1	1
38	**John Degenkolb**	Germany	2014	0	0	1	1
38	Alfons De Wolf	Belgium	1979	0	0	1	1
38	Malcolm Elliott	(United Kingdom) Great Britain	1989	0	0	1	1
38	**Fabio Felline**	Italy	2016	0	0	1	1
38	Christopher Froome	(United Kingdom) Great Britain	2017	0	0	1	1
38	André Greipel	Germany	2009	0	0	1	1
38	Cyrille Guimard	France	1971	0	0	1	1
38	Alfonso Gutiérrez	Spain	1987	0	0	1	1
38	Roberto Heras	Spain	2000	0	0	1	1
38	Vicente Iturat	Spain	1957	0	0	1	1
38	**Fabio Jakobsen**	Netherlands	2021	0	0	1	1
38	Marino Lejarreta	Spain	1983	0	0	1	1
38	Fiorenzo Magni	Italy	1955	0	0	1	1
38	Bas Maliepaard	Netherlands	1963	0	0	1	1
38	José María Jiménez	Spain	2001	0	0	1	1
38	Miguel María Lasa	Spain	1975	0	0	1	1
38	Bauke Mollema	Netherlands	2011	0	0	1	1
38	Stefan Mutter	Switzerland	1982	0	0	1	1
38	José Pérez Francés	Spain	1964	0	0	1	1
38	Guido Reybrouck	Belgium	1970	0	0	1	1
38	Delio Rodríguez	Spain	1945	0	0	1	1
38	Raymond Steegmans	Belgium	1969	0	0	1	1
38	Antonio Suárez	Spain	1961	0	0	1	1
38	Dietrich Thurau	West Germany	1976	0	0	1	1
38	Greg Van Avermaet	Belgium	2008	0	0	1	1
38	Guido Van Calster	Belgium	1984	0	0	1	1
38	Ferdi Van Den Haute	Belgium	1978	0	0	1	1
38	Jos van der Vleuten	Netherlands	1966	0	0	1	1
38	Rik Van Steenbergen	Belgium	1956	0	0	1	1
38	Frank Vandenbroucke	Belgium	1999	0	0	1	1

=== By country ===
Grand Tour points classification winners by country
Country	Giro	Tour	Vuelta	Total
Italy	33	3	5	43
Belgium	5	21	14	40
Spain	1	1	17	19
France	5	9	5	19
Germany	1	7	8	16
Netherlands	3	4	6	13
Ireland	0	5	4	9
Slovakia	1	7	0	8
Australia	1	5	2	8
Switzerland	2	2	2	6
United Kingdom	1	2	3	6
Uzbekistan	1	2	1	4
Denmark	1	1	2	4
Norway	0	2	1	3
East Germany	0	1	1	2
Russia	2	0	0	2
Slovenia	0	0	2	2
Soviet Union	0	1	0	1
Colombia	1	0	0	1
Eritrea	0	1	0	1

== See also ==
- Cycling sprinter
- Points classification in the Tour de France
- Points classification in the Giro d'Italia
- Points classification in the Vuelta a España
