= List of Grand Tour general classification winners =

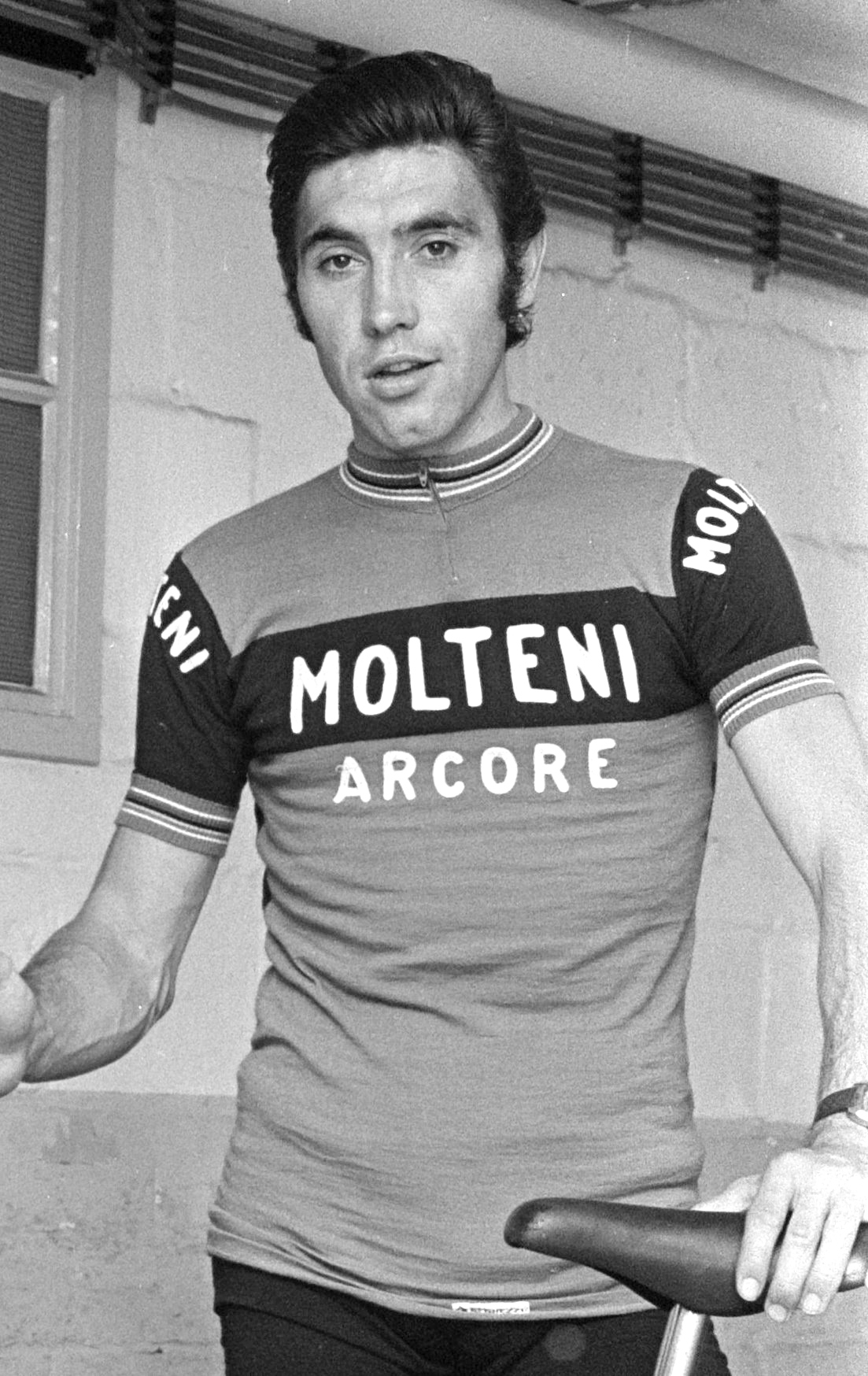
Eddy Merckx, who has won the most Grand Tours with 11 victories.

The Grand Tours are the three most prestigious multi-week stage races in professional road bicycle racing. The competitions are the Giro d'Italia, Tour de France and Vuelta a España, contested annually in that order. They are the only stage races permitted to last longer than 14 days. No cyclist has won all three Grand Tours in the same calendar year, but Eddy Merckx, Bernard Hinault and Chris Froome have won all three in succession (thus holding all titles at the same time); the only other cyclists to win all three Grand Tours at some point in their career are Jacques Anquetil, Felice Gimondi, Alberto Contador, Vincenzo Nibali and Jonas Vingegaard. Contador is the youngest, at 25 years, to win every Tour. It is rare for cyclists to ride all Grand Tours in the same year; in 2004, for example, 474 cyclists started in one of the Grand Tours, 68 rode two and only two cyclists started all three.

Cyclists are ranked on the basis of their total wins in the three Grand Tours. When there is a tie between cyclists they are listed alphabetically by the Grand Tour they won. The majority of winners have come from Europe, however, there have been a few notable victories for cyclists from other continents. Greg Lemond became the first North American to win the Tour de France in 1986, and also won again in 89' and 90'. Andrew Hampsten, became the first North American to win the Giro, when he won in 1988. Luis Herrera became the first person from South America and the Southern Hemisphere to win a Grand Tour when he won the 1987 Vuelta a España.

Eddy Merckx, with 11 victories, has won the most Grand Tours. Bernard Hinault is second with 10 and Jacques Anquetil is third with eight. Merckx, Fausto Coppi and Alfredo Binda have won the most Giros, each winning five during their career. Merckx, Hinault, Anquetil, Miguel Indurain and Tadej Pogačar hold the record for the most victories in the Tour, with five each. Roberto Heras and Primož Roglič hold the record for the most victories in the Vuelta, with four wins each.

== Winners ==
=== By cyclist ===
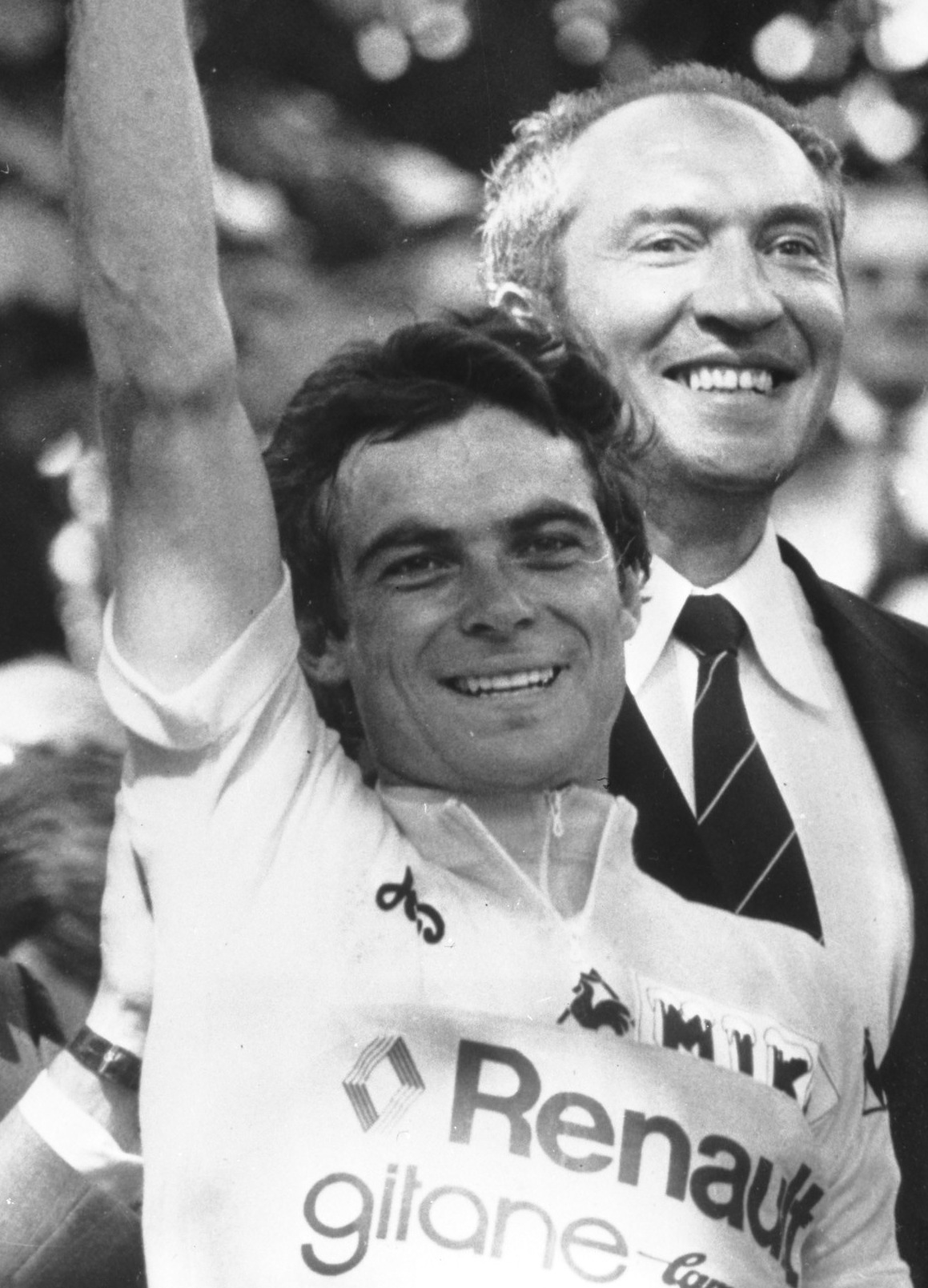
Bernard Hinault won 10 Grand Tours during his career.

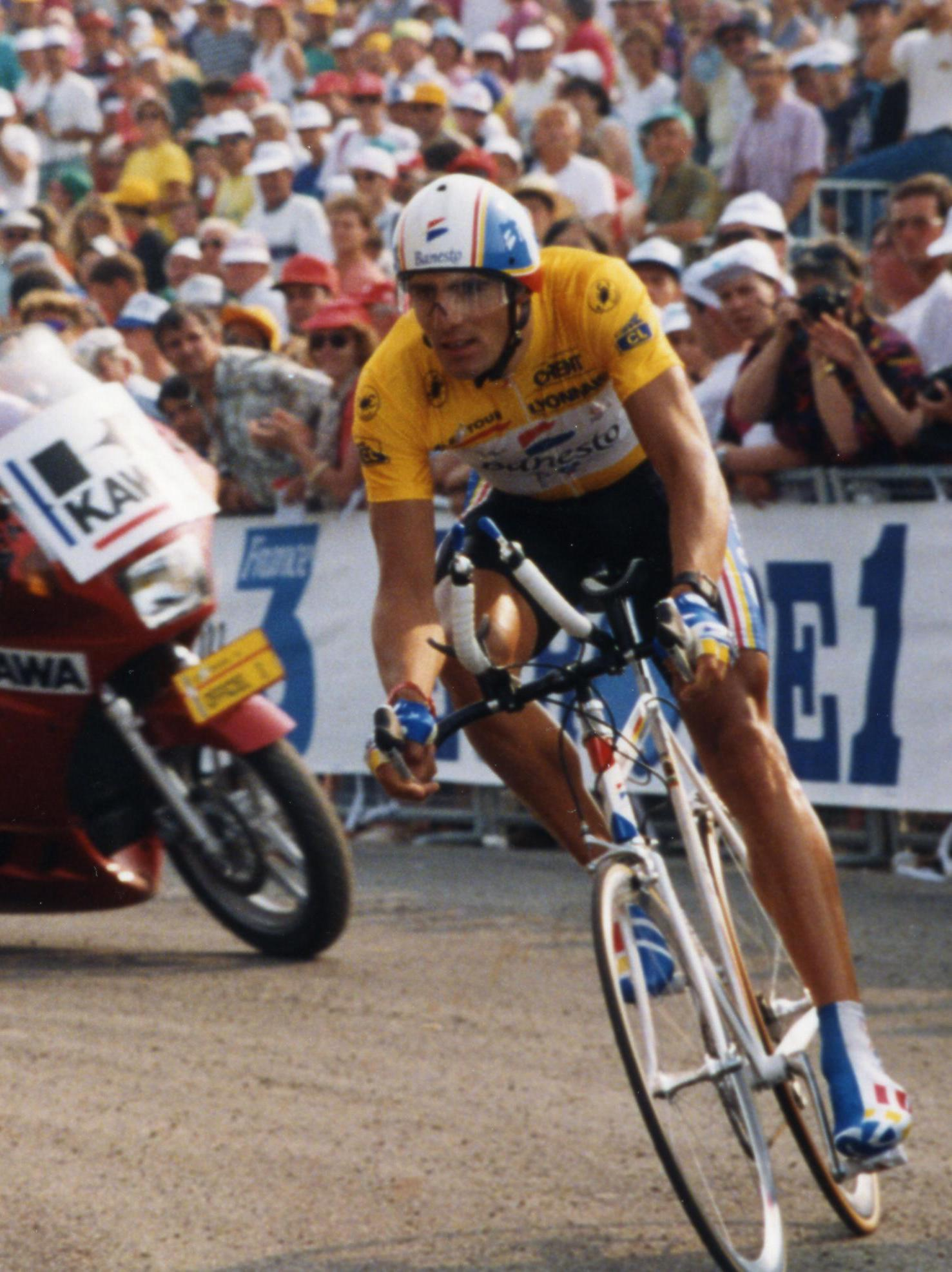
Miguel Indurain, winner of seven Grand Tours

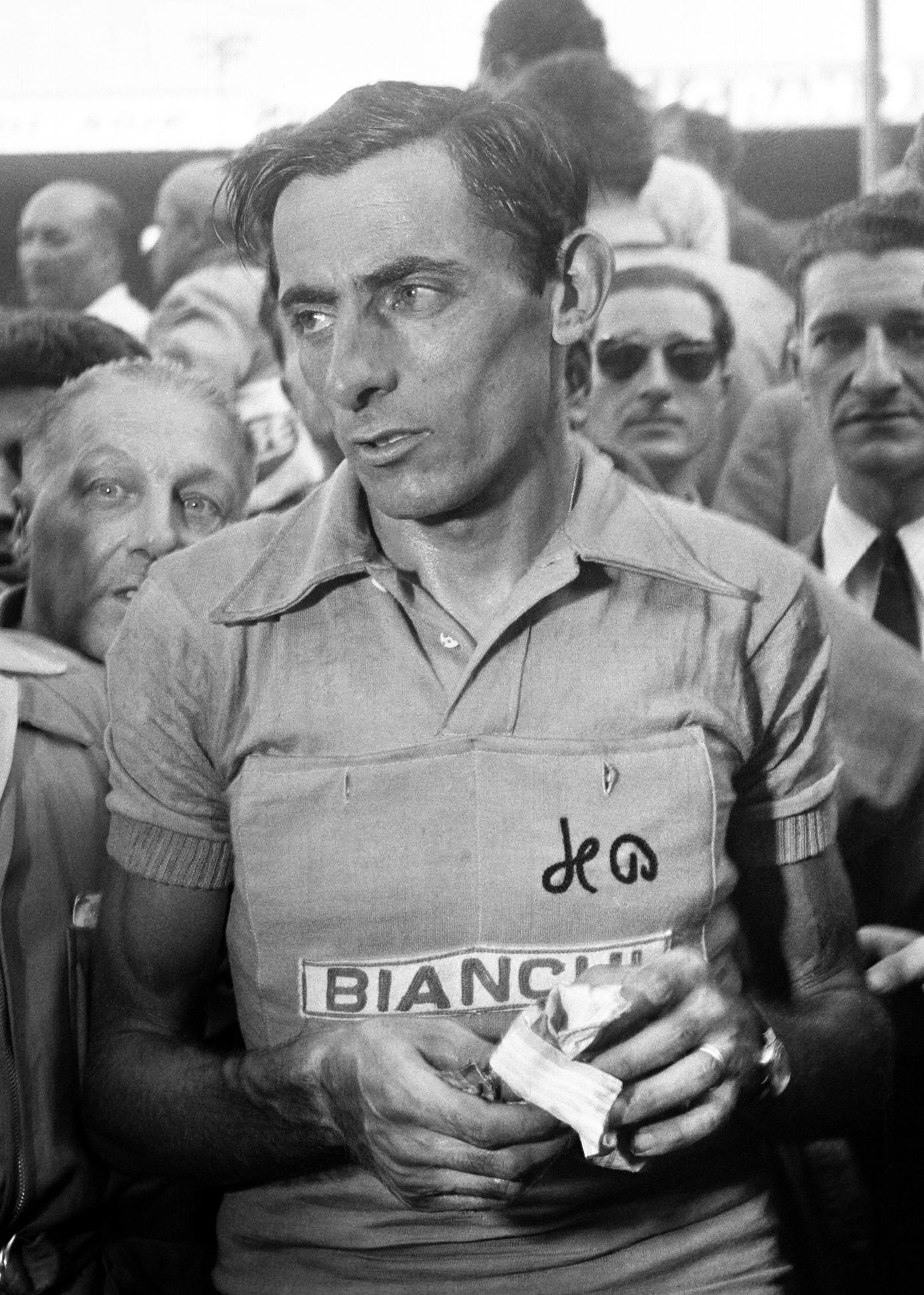
Fausto Coppi won five Giros and the Tour de France twice.

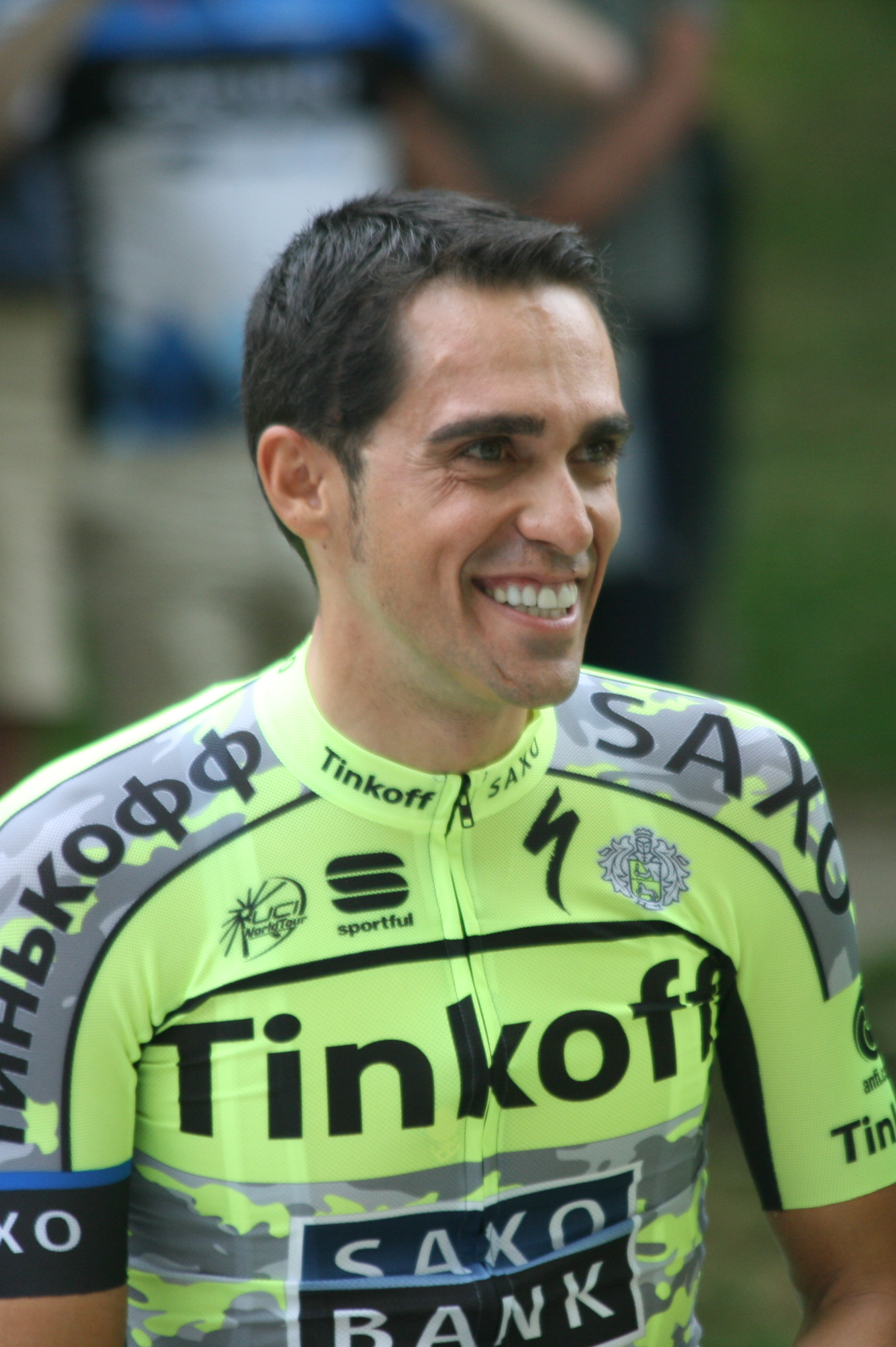
Alberto Contador, the fifth cyclist to have won all three Grand Tours during his career

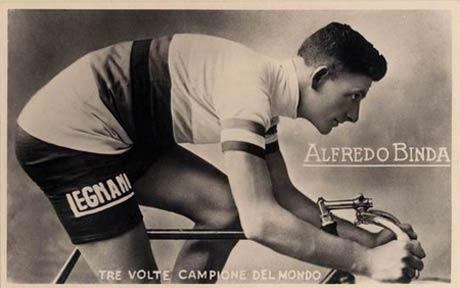
Alfredo Binda won the Giro d'Italia five times.

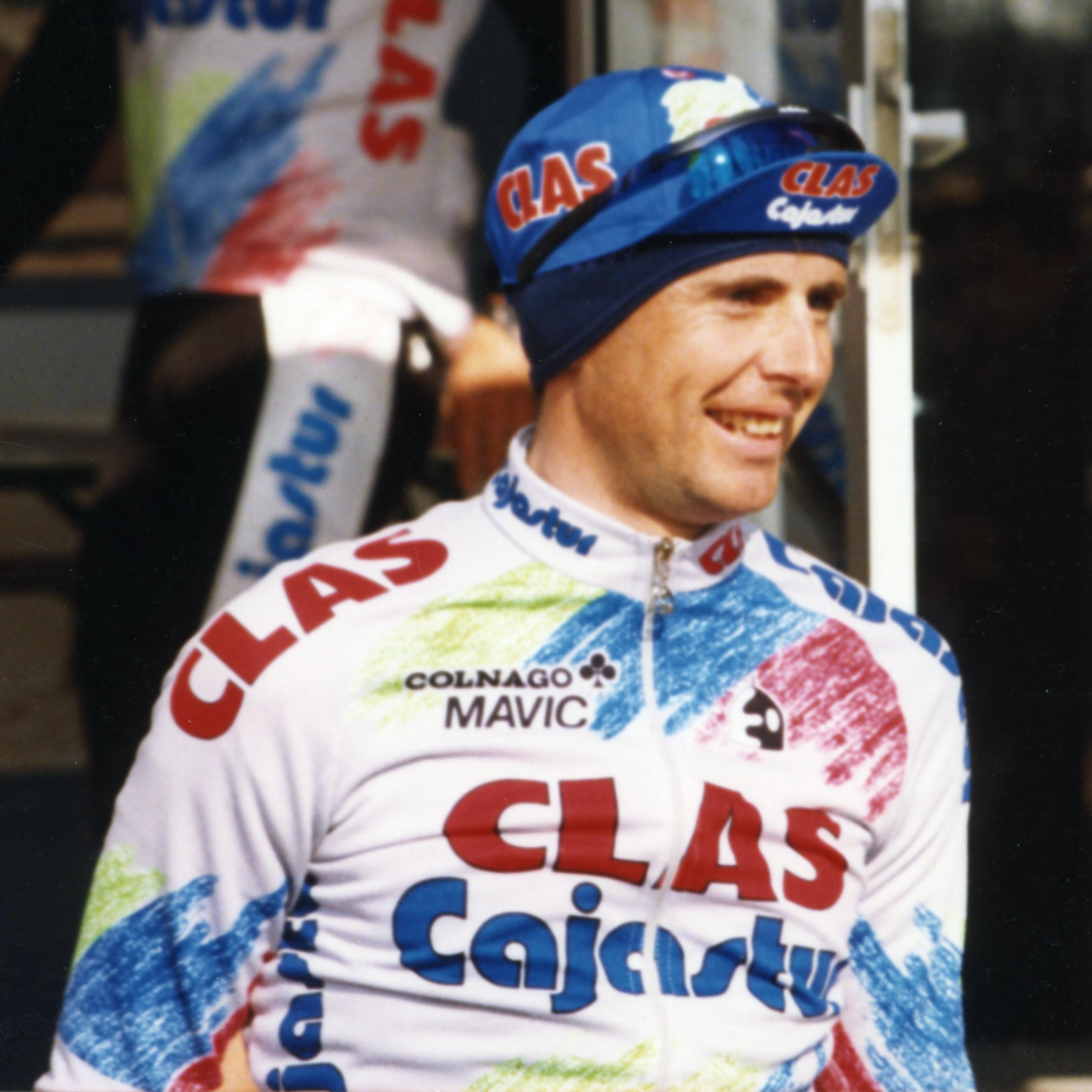
Tony Rominger, winner of four Grand Tours

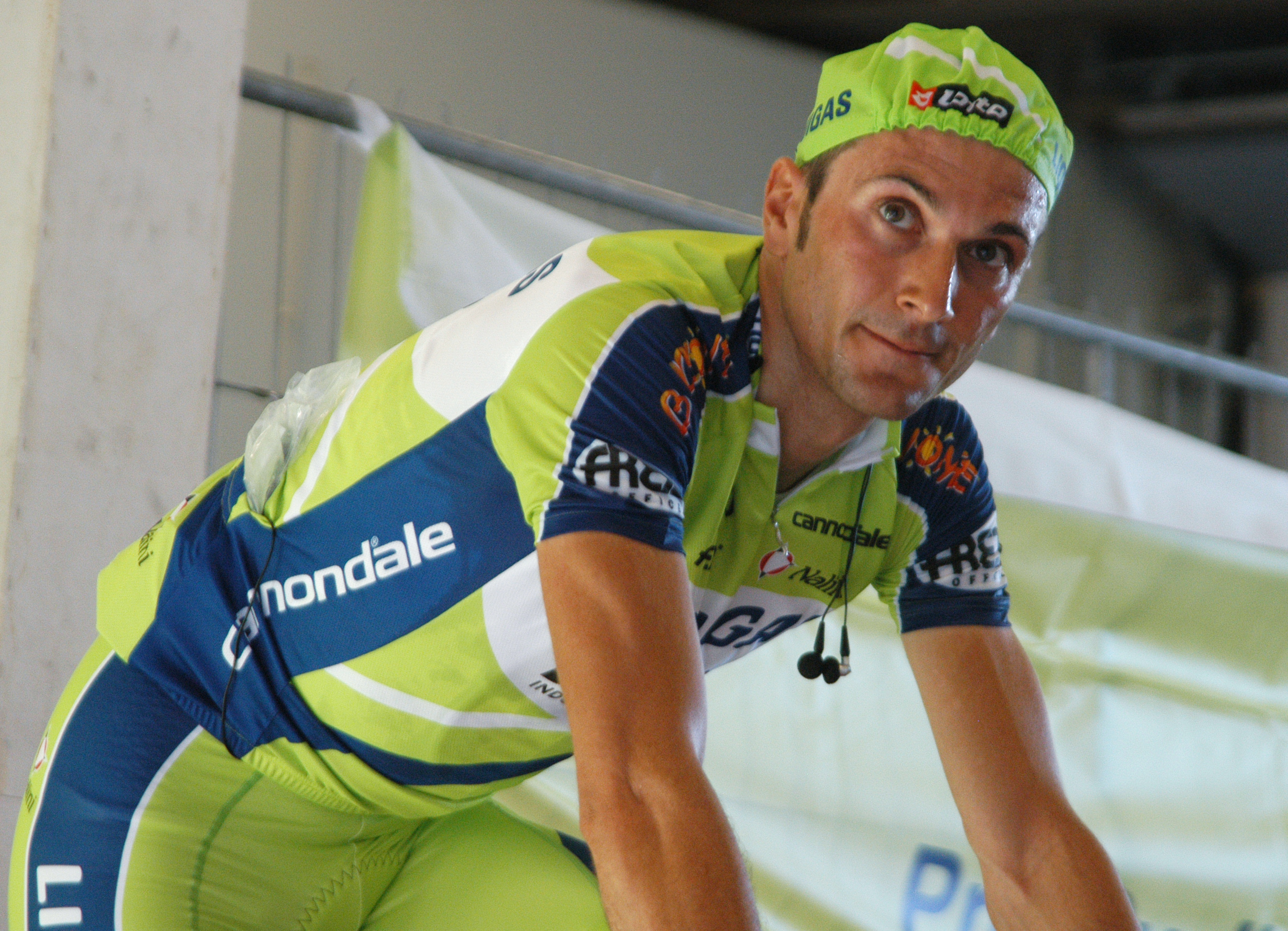
Ivan Basso, he has won two Giros

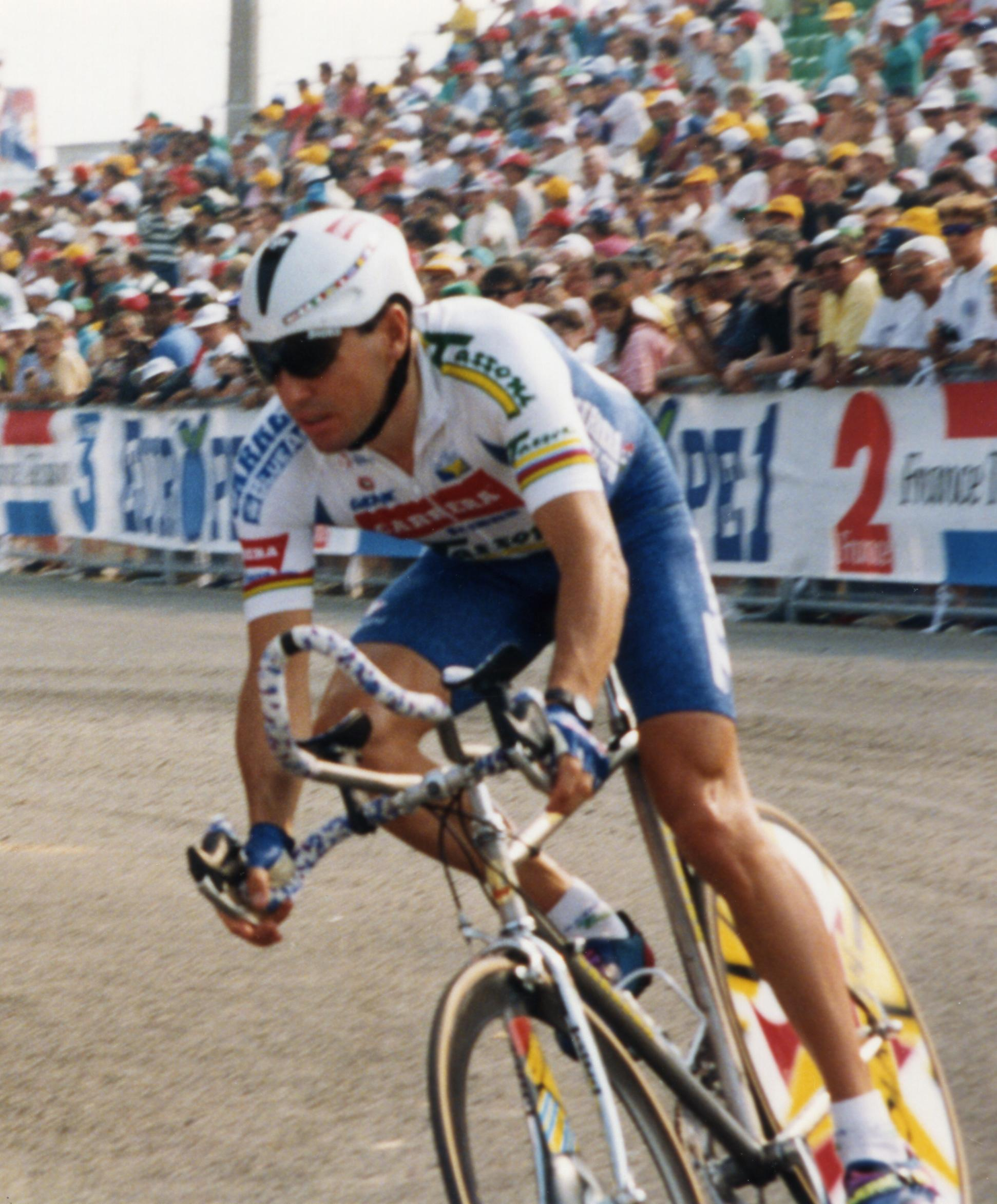
Stephen Roche, winner of two Grand Tours

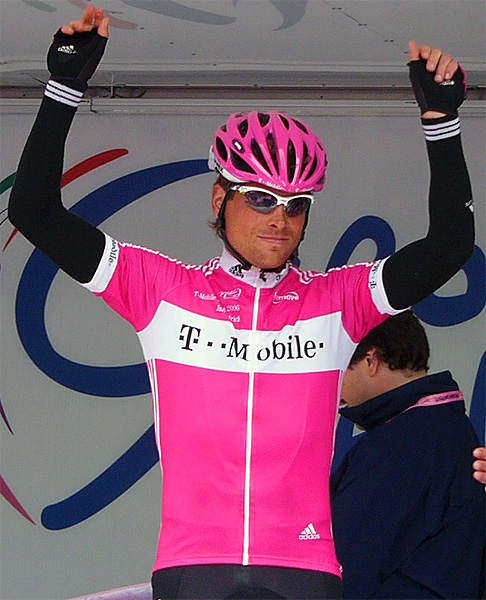
Jan Ullrich won two Grand Tours.

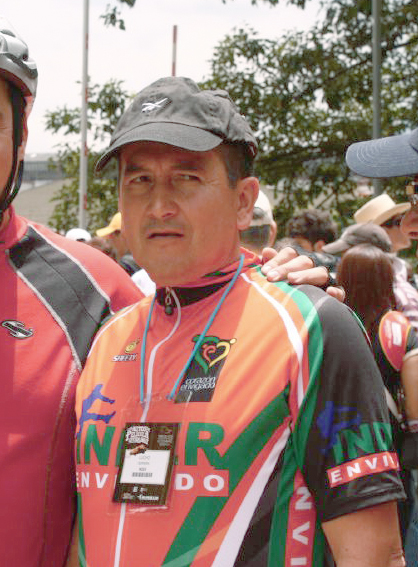
Luis Herrera was the first South American to win a Grand Tour.

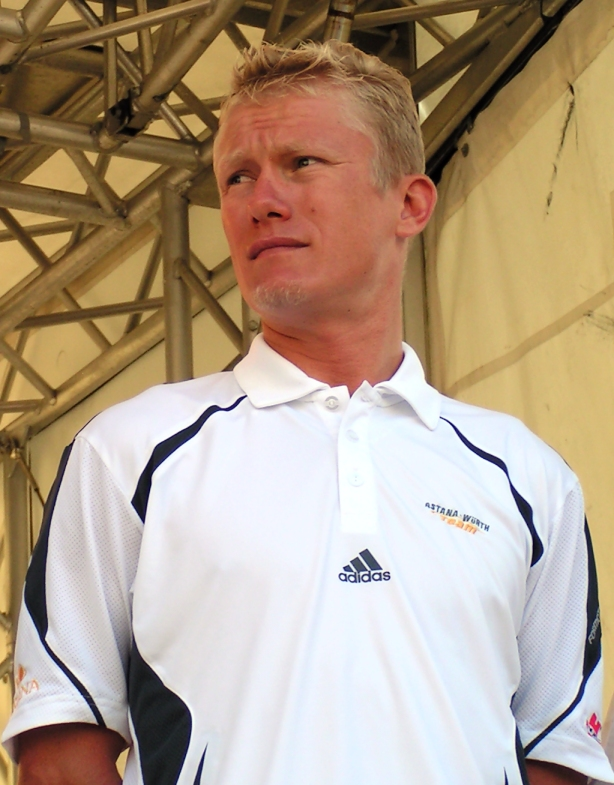
Alexander Vinokourov was winner of the 2006 Vuelta a España.

Riders in bold are still active. Number of wins in gold indicates the current record holder(s).

Grand Tour general classification winners
| Rank | Cyclist | Country | Winning span | Giro | Tour | Vuelta | Total |
|---|---|---|---|---|---|---|---|
| 1 | Eddy Merckx | Belgium | 1968–1974 | **5** | **5** | 1 | **11** |
| 2 | Bernard Hinault | France | 1978–1985 | 3 | **5** | 2 | **10** |
| 3 | Jacques Anquetil | France | 1957–1964 | 2 | **5** | 1 | **8** |
| 4 | Fausto Coppi | Italy | 1940–1953 | **5** | 2 | 0 | **7** |
| 4 | Miguel Induráin | Spain | 1991–1995 | 2 | **5** | 0 | **7** |
| 4 | Alberto Contador | Spain | 2007-2015 | 2 | 2 | 3 | **7** |
| 4 | Chris Froome | (United Kingdom) Great Britain | 2011–2018 | 1 | 4 | 2 | **7** |
| 8 | **Tadej Pogačar** | Slovenia | 2020–2026 | 1 | **5** | 0 | **6** |
| 9 | Alfredo Binda | Italy | 1925–1933 | **5** | 0 | 0 | **5** |
| 9 | Gino Bartali | Italy | 1936–1948 | 3 | 2 | 0 | **5** |
| 9 | Felice Gimondi | Italy | 1965–1976 | 3 | 1 | 1 | **5** |
| 9 | **Primož Roglič** | Slovenia | 2019–2024 | 1 | 0 | **4** | **5** |
| 13 | Vincenzo Nibali | Italy | 2010–2016 | 2 | 1 | 1 | **4** |
| 13 | Tony Rominger | Switzerland | 1992–1995 | 1 | 0 | 3 | **4** |
| 13 | Roberto Heras | Spain | 2000–2005 | 0 | 0 | **4** | **4** |
| 13 | **Jonas Vingegaard** | Denmark | 2022–2026 | 1 | 2 | 1 | **4** |
| 17 | Giovanni Brunero | Italy | 1921–1926 | 3 | 0 | 0 | **3** |
| 17 | Carlo Galetti | Italy | 1910–1912 | 3 (Note: This includes team-based general classification win of 1912 Giro d'Italia.) | 0 | 0 | **3** |
| 17 | Fiorenzo Magni | Italy | 1948–1955 | 3 | 0 | 0 | **3** |
| 17 | Louison Bobet | France | 1953–1955 | 0 | 3 | 0 | **3** |
| 17 | Greg LeMond | United States | 1986–1990 | 0 | 3 | 0 | **3** |
| 17 | Philippe Thys | Belgium | 1913–1920 | 0 | 3 | 0 | **3** |
| 17 | Charly Gaul | Luxembourg | 1956–1959 | 2 | 1 | 0 | **3** |
| 17 | Laurent Fignon | France | 1983–1989 | 1 | 2 | 0 | **3** |
| 17 | Pedro Delgado | Spain | 1985–1989 | 0 | 1 | 2 | **3** |
| 26 | Franco Balmamion | Italy | 1962–1963 | 2 | 0 | 0 | **2** |
| 26 | Ivan Basso | Italy | 2006–2010 | 2 | 0 | 0 | **2** |
| 26 | Costante Girardengo | Italy | 1919–1923 | 2 | 0 | 0 | **2** |
| 26 | Ivan Gotti | Italy | 1997–1999 | 2 | 0 | 0 | **2** |
| 26 | Giuseppe Saronni | Italy | 1979–1983 | 2 | 0 | 0 | **2** |
| 26 | Paolo Savoldelli | Italy | 2002–2005 | 2 | 0 | 0 | **2** |
| 26 | Gilberto Simoni | Italy | 2001–2003 | 2 | 0 | 0 | **2** |
| 26 | Giovanni Valetti | Italy | 1938–1939 | 2 | 0 | 0 | **2** |
| 26 | Ottavio Bottecchia | Italy | 1924–1925 | 0 | 2 | 0 | **2** |
| 26 | Nicolas Frantz | Luxembourg | 1927–1928 | 0 | 2 | 0 | **2** |
| 26 | Firmin Lambot | Belgium | 1919–1922 | 0 | 2 | 0 | **2** |
| 26 | André Leducq | France | 1930–1932 | 0 | 2 | 0 | **2** |
| 26 | Sylvère Maes | Belgium | 1936–1939 | 0 | 2 | 0 | **2** |
| 26 | Antonin Magne | France | 1931–1934 | 0 | 2 | 0 | **2** |
| 26 | Lucien Petit-Breton | France | 1907–1908 | 0 | 2 | 0 | **2** |
| 26 | Bernard Thévenet | France | 1975–1977 | 0 | 2 | 0 | **2** |
| 26 | Julián Berrendero | Spain | 1941–1942 | 0 | 0 | 2 | **2** |
| 26 | Gustaaf Deloor | Belgium | 1935–1936 | 0 | 0 | 2 | **2** |
| 26 | José Manuel Fuente | Spain | 1972–1974 | 0 | 0 | 2 | **2** |
| 26 | Alex Zülle | Switzerland | 1996–1997 | 0 | 0 | 2 | **2** |
| 26 | **Egan Bernal** | Colombia | 2019–2021 | 1 | 1 | 0 | **2** |
| 26 | Hugo Koblet | Switzerland | 1950–1951 | 1 | 1 | 0 | **2** |
| 26 | Gastone Nencini | Italy | 1957–1960 | 1 | 1 | 0 | **2** |
| 26 | Marco Pantani | Italy | 1998 | 1 | 1 | 0 | **2** |
| 26 | Stephen Roche | (Republic of Ireland) Ireland | 1987 | 1 | 1 | 0 | **2** |
| 26 | Giovanni Battaglin | Italy | 1981 | 1 | 0 | 1 | **2** |
| 26 | Denis Menchov | Russia | 2007–2009 | 1 | 0 | 1 | **2** |
| 26 | **Nairo Quintana** | Colombia | 2014–2016 | 1 | 0 | 1 | **2** |
| 26 | Simon Yates | (United Kingdom) Great Britain | 2018–2025 | 1 | 0 | 1 | **2** |
| 26 | Jan Janssen | Netherlands | 1967–1968 | 0 | 1 | 1 | **2** |
| 26 | Luis Ocaña | Spain | 1970–1973 | 0 | 1 | 1 | **2** |
| 26 | Roger Pingeon | France | 1967–1969 | 0 | 1 | 1 | **2** |
| 26 | Jan Ullrich | Germany | 1997–1999 | 0 | 1 | 1 | **2** |
| 26 | Joop Zoetemelk | Netherlands | 1979–1980 | 0 | 1 | 1 | **2** |
| 60 | Vittorio Adorni | Italy | 1965 | 1 | 0 | 0 | **1** |
| 60 | Ercole Baldini | Italy | 1958 | 1 | 0 | 0 | **1** |
| 60 | Gaetano Belloni | Italy | 1920 | 1 | 0 | 0 | **1** |
| 60 | Vasco Bergamaschi | Italy | 1935 | 1 | 0 | 0 | **1** |
| 60 | Fausto Bertoglio | Italy | 1975 | 1 | 0 | 0 | **1** |
| 60 | Evgeni Berzin | Russia | 1994 | 1 | 0 | 0 | **1** |
| 60 | Gianni Bugno | Italy | 1990 | 1 | 0 | 0 | **1** |
| 60 | Alfonso Calzolari | Italy | 1914 | 1 | 0 | 0 | **1** |
| 60 | Francesco Camusso | Italy | 1931 | 1 | 0 | 0 | **1** |
| 60 | **Richard Carapaz** | Ecuador | 2019 | 1 | 0 | 0 | **1** |
| 60 | Franco Chioccioli | Italy | 1991 | 1 | 0 | 0 | **1** |
| 60 | Carlo Clerici | Switzerland | 1954 | 1 | 0 | 0 | **1** |
| 60 | Damiano Cunego | Italy | 2004 | 1 | 0 | 0 | **1** |
| 60 | Johan De Muynck | Belgium | 1978 | 1 | 0 | 0 | **1** |
| 60 | Danilo Di Luca | Italy | 2007 | 1 | 0 | 0 | **1** |
| 60 | Tom Dumoulin | Netherlands | 2017 | 1 | 0 | 0 | **1** |
| 60 | Giuseppe Enrici | Italy | 1924 | 1 | 0 | 0 | **1** |
| 60 | Luigi Ganna | Italy | 1909 | 1 | 0 | 0 | **1** |
| 60 | Stefano Garzelli | Italy | 2000 | 1 | 0 | 0 | **1** |
| 60 | **Tao Geoghegan Hart** | (United Kingdom) Great Britain | 2020 | 1 | 0 | 0 | **1** |
| 60 | **Jai Hindley** | Australia | 2022 | 1 | 0 | 0 | **1** |
| 60 | Learco Guerra | Italy | 1934 | 1 | 0 | 0 | **1** |
| 60 | Andrew Hampsten | United States | 1988 | 1 | 0 | 0 | **1** |
| 60 | Ryder Hesjedal | Canada | 2012 | 1 | 0 | 0 | **1** |
| 60 | Luigi Marchisio | Italy | 1930 | 1 | 0 | 0 | **1** |
| 60 | Giovanni Micheletto | Italy | 1912 | 1 | 0 | 0 | **1** |
| 60 | Francesco Moser | Italy | 1984 | 1 | 0 | 0 | **1** |
| 60 | Gianni Motta | Italy | 1966 | 1 | 0 | 0 | **1** |
| 60 | Carlo Oriani | Italy | 1913 | 1 | 0 | 0 | **1** |
| 60 | Arnaldo Pambianco | Italy | 1961 | 1 | 0 | 0 | **1** |
| 60 | Eberardo Pavesi | Italy | 1912 | 1 | 0 | 0 | **1** |
| 60 | Antonio Pesenti | Italy | 1932 | 1 | 0 | 0 | **1** |
| 60 | Gösta Pettersson | Sweden | 1971 | 1 | 0 | 0 | **1** |
| 60 | Michel Pollentier | Belgium | 1977 | 1 | 0 | 0 | **1** |
| 60 | Michele Scarponi | Italy | 2011 | 1 | 0 | 0 | **1** |
| 60 | Pavel Tonkov | Russia | 1996 | 1 | 0 | 0 | **1** |
| 60 | Roberto Visentini | Italy | 1986 | 1 | 0 | 0 | **1** |
| 60 | Lucien Aimar | France | 1966 | 0 | 1 | 0 | **1** |
| 60 | Federico Bahamontes | Spain | 1959 | 0 | 1 | 0 | **1** |
| 60 | Lucien Buysse | Belgium | 1926 | 0 | 1 | 0 | **1** |
| 60 | Henri Cornet | France | 1904 | 0 | 1 | 0 | **1** |
| 60 | Maurice De Waele | Belgium | 1929 | 0 | 1 | 0 | **1** |
| 60 | Odile Defraye | Belgium | 1912 | 0 | 1 | 0 | **1** |
| 60 | Cadel Evans | Australia | 2011 | 0 | 1 | 0 | **1** |
| 60 | François Faber | Luxembourg | 1909 | 0 | 1 | 0 | **1** |
| 60 | Maurice Garin | France | 1903 | 0 | 1 | 0 | **1** |
| 60 | Gustave Garrigou | France | 1911 | 0 | 1 | 0 | **1** |
| 60 | Ferdinand Kübler | Switzerland | 1950 | 0 | 1 | 0 | **1** |
| 60 | Roger Lapébie | France | 1937 | 0 | 1 | 0 | **1** |
| 60 | Octave Lapize | France | 1910 | 0 | 1 | 0 | **1** |
| 60 | Romain Maes | Belgium | 1935 | 0 | 1 | 0 | **1** |
| 60 | Henri Pélissier | France | 1966 | 0 | 1 | 0 | **1** |
| 60 | Óscar Pereiro | Spain | 2006 | 0 | 1 | 0 | **1** |
| 60 | René Pottier | France | 1906 | 0 | 1 | 0 | **1** |
| 60 | Bjarne Riis | Denmark | 1996 | 0 | 1 | 0 | **1** |
| 60 | Jean Robic | France | 1947 | 0 | 1 | 0 | **1** |
| 60 | Carlos Sastre | Spain | 2008 | 0 | 1 | 0 | **1** |
| 60 | Andy Schleck | Luxembourg | 2010 | 0 | 1 | 0 | **1** |
| 60 | Léon Scieur | Belgium | 1921 | 0 | 1 | 0 | **1** |
| 60 | Georges Speicher | France | 1933 | 0 | 1 | 0 | **1** |
| 60 | Geraint Thomas | (United Kingdom) Great Britain | 2018 | 0 | 1 | 0 | **1** |
| 60 | Louis Trousselier | France | 1905 | 0 | 1 | 0 | **1** |
| 60 | Lucien Van Impe | Belgium | 1976 | 0 | 1 | 0 | **1** |
| 60 | Roger Walkowiak | France | 1956 | 0 | 1 | 0 | **1** |
| 60 | Bradley Wiggins | (United Kingdom) Great Britain | 2012 | 0 | 1 | 0 | **1** |
| 60 | Rudi Altig | Germany | 1962 | 0 | 0 | 1 | **1** |
| 60 | Fabio Aru | Italy | 2015 | 0 | 0 | 1 | **1** |
| 60 | Ferdinand Bracke | Belgium | 1971 | 0 | 0 | 1 | **1** |
| 60 | Éric Caritoux | France | 1984 | 0 | 0 | 1 | **1** |
| 60 | Ángel Casero | Spain | 2001 | 0 | 0 | 1 | **1** |
| 60 | Angelo Conterno | Italy | 1956 | 0 | 0 | 1 | **1** |
| 60 | Frans De Mulder | Belgium | 1960 | 0 | 0 | 1 | **1** |
| 60 | Jean Dotto | France | 1955 | 0 | 0 | 1 | **1** |
| 60 | **Remco Evenepoel** | Belgium | 2022 | 0 | 0 | 1 | **1** |
| 60 | Francisco Gabica | Spain | 1966 | 0 | 0 | 1 | **1** |
| 60 | Marco Giovannetti | Italy | 1990 | 0 | 0 | 1 | **1** |
| 60 | Aitor González | Spain | 2002 | 0 | 0 | 1 | **1** |
| 60 | Luis Herrera | Colombia | 1987 | 0 | 0 | 1 | **1** |
| 60 | Chris Horner | United States | 2013 | 0 | 0 | 1 | **1** |
| 60 | Laurent Jalabert | France | 1995 | 0 | 0 | 1 | **1** |
| 60 | Sean Kelly | (Republic of Ireland) Ireland | 1988 | 0 | 0 | 1 | **1** |
| 60 | **Sepp Kuss** | United States | 2023 | 0 | 0 | 1 | 1 |
| 60 | Dalmacio Langarica | Spain | 1946 | 0 | 0 | 1 | **1** |
| 60 | Marino Lejarreta | Spain | 1982 | 0 | 0 | 1 | **1** |
| 60 | Jesús Loroño | Spain | 1957 | 0 | 0 | 1 | **1** |
| 60 | Freddy Maertens | Belgium | 1977 | 0 | 0 | 1 | **1** |
| 60 | **Enric Mas** | Spain | 2026 | 0 | 0 | 1 | **1** |
| 60 | Melcior Mauri | Spain | 1991 | 0 | 0 | 1 | **1** |
| 60 | Abraham Olano | Spain | 1998 | 0 | 0 | 1 | **1** |
| 60 | José Pesarrodona | Spain | 1976 | 0 | 0 | 1 | **1** |
| 60 | Álvaro Pino | Spain | 1986 | 0 | 0 | 1 | **1** |
| 60 | Raymond Poulidor | France | 1964 | 0 | 0 | 1 | **1** |
| 60 | Delio Rodríguez | Spain | 1945 | 0 | 0 | 1 | **1** |
| 60 | Emilio Rodríguez | Spain | 1950 | 0 | 0 | 1 | **1** |
| 60 | Bernardo Ruiz | Spain | 1948 | 0 | 0 | 1 | **1** |
| 60 | Faustino Rupérez | Spain | 1980 | 0 | 0 | 1 | **1** |
| 60 | Angelino Soler | Spain | 1961 | 0 | 0 | 1 | **1** |
| 60 | Jean Stablinski | France | 1958 | 0 | 0 | 1 | **1** |
| 60 | Antonio Suárez | Spain | 1959 | 0 | 0 | 1 | **1** |
| 60 | Agustín Tamames | Spain | 1975 | 0 | 0 | 1 | **1** |
| 60 | Alejandro Valverde | Spain | 2009 | 0 | 0 | 1 | **1** |
| 60 | Edward Van Dijck | Belgium | 1947 | 0 | 0 | 1 | **1** |
| 60 | Alexander Vinokourov | Kazakhstan | 2006 | 0 | 0 | 1 | **1** |
| 60 | Rolf Wolfshohl | Germany | 1965 | 0 | 0 | 1 | **1** |

=== By country ===
Grand Tour general classification winners by country
| Rank | Country | Giro | Tour | Vuelta | Total |
|---|---|---|---|---|---|
| 1 | Italy | 69 | 10 | 6 | 85 |
| 2 | France | 6 | 36 | 9 | 51 |
| 3 | Spain | 4 | 12 | 33 | 49 |
| 4 | Belgium | 7 | 18 | 8 | 33 |
| 5 | Great Britain | 3 | 6 | 3 | 12 |
| 6 | Slovenia | 2 | 5 | 4 | 11 |
| 7 | Switzerland | 3 | 2 | 5 | 10 |
| 8 | Luxembourg | 2 | 5 | 0 | 7 |
| 9 | United States | 1 | 3 | 2 | 6 |
| 10 | Netherlands | 1 | 2 | 2 | 5 |
| 10 | Colombia | 2 | 1 | 2 | 5 |
| 10 | Denmark | 1 | 3 | 1 | 5 |
| 13 | Germany | 0 | 1 | 3 | 4 |
| 13 | Russia | 3 | 0 | 1 | 4 |
| 15 | Ireland | 1 | 1 | 1 | 3 |
| 16 | Australia | 1 | 1 | 0 | 2 |
| 17 | Sweden | 1 | 0 | 0 | 1 |
| 17 | Canada | 1 | 0 | 0 | 1 |
| 17 | Ecuador | 1 | 0 | 0 | 1 |
| 17 | Kazakhstan | 0 | 0 | 1 | 1 |

== See also ==
- Grand Tour (cycling)
