= Course de la Paix U23 – Grand Prix Jeseníky =

Czech multi-day road cycling race

Race details
- Date: May or June
- Region: Czech Republic
- Local name: Závod míru U23
- Discipline: Road race
- Competition: UCI Europe Tour
- Type: Stage race
- Web site: zavodmiru.com

History
- First edition: 2013
- Editions: 13 (as of 2026)
- First winner: Toms Skujiņš (LAT)
- Most wins: No repeat winners
- Most recent: Kamiel Eeman (BEL)

The Course de la Paix U23 – Grand Prix Jeseníky is a multi-day road cycling race held annually in the Czech Republic. It is part of the UCI Europe Tour in category 2.ncup, meaning it is part of the UCI Under 23 Nations' Cup. It had a rating of 2.2U from 2013 to 2014, and was upgraded to 2.ncup in 2015.

== Winners ==
Year	Country	Rider	Team
2013	Latvia	Toms Skujiņš	Latvia (national team)
2014	Australia	Samuel Spokes	Australia (national team)
2015	Austria	Gregor Mühlberger	Austria (national team)
2016	France	David Gaudu	France (national team)
2017	Belgium	Bjorg Lambrecht	Belgium (national team)
2018	Slovenia	Tadej Pogačar	Slovenia (national team)
2019	Norway	Andreas Leknessund	Norway (national team)
2020	No race due to the COVID-19 pandemic in the Czech Republic		
2021	Italy	Filippo Zana	Italy (national team)
2022	Belgium	Lennert Van Eetvelt	Belgium (national team)
2023	France	Antoine Huby	France (national team)
2024	France	Brieuc Rolland	France (national team)
2025	Spain	Pau Martí	Spain (national team)
2026	Belgium	Kamiel Eeman	Belgium (national team)
