= Points classification =

Bicycle racing award type

The points classification is a secondary award category in road bicycle racing. Points are given for high finishes and, in some cases, for winning sprints at certain places along the route, most often called intermediate sprints. The points classification is the top prize for many cycling sprinters and is often known as the sprint classification; however, in some stage races these classifications are based on different criteria.

The points classification is arguably the second most important title and cycling jersey to win at a cycling stage race behind the general classification, which is the winner of the event by overall time.

== Points classification winners of the Grand Tours ==
=== Winners by year ===
Legend
Rider also won General classification
Rider also won General and Mountains classification

Year	Giro d'Italia	Tour de France	Vuelta a España
1945	Introduced in 1966	Introduced in 1953	Delio Rodríguez (ESP) (1/1)
1953	Introduced in 1966	Fritz Schär (SUI) (1/1)	Reintroduced in 1955
1954	Introduced in 1966	Ferdinand Kübler (SUI) (1/1)	Reintroduced in 1955
1955	Introduced in 1966	Stan Ockers (BEL) (1/2)	Fiorenzo Magni (ITA) (1/1)
1956	Introduced in 1966	Stan Ockers (BEL) (2/2)	Rik Van Steenbergen (BEL) (1/1)
1957	Introduced in 1966	Jean Forestier (FRA) (1/1)	Vicente Iturat (ESP) (1/1)
1958	Introduced in 1966	Jean Graczyk (FRA) (1/2)	Salvador Botella (ESP) (1/1)
1959	Introduced in 1966	André Darrigade (FRA) (1/2)	Rik Van Looy (BEL) (1/3)
1960	Introduced in 1966	Jean Graczyk (FRA) (2/2)	Arthur Decabooter (BEL) (1/1)
1961	Introduced in 1966	André Darrigade (FRA) (2/2)	Antonio Suárez (ESP) (1/1)
1962	Introduced in 1966	Rudi Altig (FRG) (1/2)	Rudi Altig (GER) (2/2)
1963	Introduced in 1966	Rik Van Looy (BEL) (2/3)	Bas Maliepaard (NED) (1/1)
1964	Introduced in 1966	Jan Janssen (NED) (1/5)	José Pérez Francés (ESP) (1/1)
1965	Introduced in 1966	Jan Janssen (NED) (2/5)	Rik Van Looy (BEL) (3/3)
1966	Gianni Motta (ITA) (1/1)	Willy Planckaert (BEL) (1/1)	Jos van der Vleuten (NED) (1/1)
1967	Dino Zandegù (ITA) (1/1)	Jan Janssen (NED) (4/5)	Jan Janssen (NED) (3/5)
1968	Eddy Merckx (BEL) (1/6)	Franco Bitossi (ITA) (1/3)	Jan Janssen (NED) (5/5)
1969	Franco Bitossi (ITA) (2/3)	Eddy Merckx (BEL) (2/6)	Raymond Steegmans (BEL) (1/1)
1970	Franco Bitossi (ITA) (3/3)	Walter Godefroot (BEL) (1/1)	Guido Reybrouck (BEL) (1/1)
1971	Marino Basso (ITA) (1/1)	Eddy Merckx (BEL) (3/6)	Cyrille Guimard (FRA) (1/1)
1972	Roger De Vlaeminck (BEL) (1/3)	Eddy Merckx (BEL) (4/6)	Domingo Perurena (ESP) (1/2)
1973	Eddy Merckx (BEL) (6/6)	Herman Van Springel (BEL) (1/1)	Eddy Merckx (BEL) (5/6)
1974	Roger De Vlaeminck (BEL) (2/3)	Patrick Sercu (BEL) (1/1)	Domingo Perurena (ESP) (2/2)
1975	Roger De Vlaeminck (BEL) (3/3)	Rik Van Linden (BEL) (1/1)	Miguel María Lasa (ESP) (1/1)
1976	Francesco Moser (ITA) (1/4)	Freddy Maertens (BEL) (1/4)	Dietrich Thurau (GER) (1/1)
1977	Francesco Moser (ITA) (2/4)	Jacques Esclassan (FRA) (1/1)	Freddy Maertens (BEL) (2/4)
1978	Francesco Moser (ITA) (3/4)	Freddy Maertens (BEL) (3/4)	Ferdi Van Den Haute (BEL) (1/1)
1979	Giuseppe Saronni (ITA) (1/4)	Bernard Hinault (FRA) (1/1)	Alfons De Wolf (BEL) (1/1)
1980	Giuseppe Saronni (ITA) (2/4)	Rudy Pevenage (BEL) (1/1)	Sean Kelly (IRL) (1/8)
1981	Giuseppe Saronni (ITA) (3/4)	Freddy Maertens (BEL) (4/4)	Francisco Javier Cedena (ESP) (1/1)
1982	Francesco Moser (ITA) (4/4)	Sean Kelly (IRL) (2/8)	Stefan Mutter (SUI) (1/1)
1983	Giuseppe Saronni (ITA) (4/4)	Sean Kelly (IRL) (3/8)	Marino Lejarreta (ESP) (1/1)
1984	Urs Freuler (SUI) (1/1)	Frank Hoste (BEL) (1/1)	Guido Van Calster (BEL) (1/1)
1985	Johan van der Velde (NED) (1/3)	Sean Kelly (IRL) (4/8)	Sean Kelly (IRL) (5/8)
1986	Guido Bontempi (ITA) (1/1)	Eric Vanderaerden (BEL) (1/1)	Sean Kelly (IRL) (6/8)
1987	Johan van der Velde (NED) (2/3)	Jean-Paul van Poppel (NED) (1/1)	Alfonso Gutiérrez (ESP) (1/1)
1988	Johan van der Velde (NED) (3/3)	Eddy Planckaert (BEL) (1/1)	Sean Kelly (IRL) (7/8)
1989	Giovanni Fidanza (ITA) (1/1)	Sean Kelly (IRL) (8/8)	Malcolm Elliott (GBR) (1/1)
1990	Gianni Bugno (ITA) (1/1)	Olaf Ludwig (GDR) (1/1)	Uwe Raab (GDR) (1/2)
1991	Claudio Chiappucci (ITA) (1/1)	Djamolidine Abdoujaparov (URS) (1/5)	Uwe Raab (GER) (2/2)
1992	Mario Cipollini (ITA) (1/3)	Laurent Jalabert (FRA) (1/7)	Djamolidine Abdoujaparov (UZB) (2/5)
1993	Adriano Baffi (ITA) (1/1)	Djamolidine Abdoujaparov (UZB) (3/5)	Tony Rominger (SUI) (1/2)
1994	Djamolidine Abdoujaparov (UZB) (4/5)	Djamolidine Abdoujaparov (UZB) (5/5)	Laurent Jalabert (FRA) (2/7)
1995	Tony Rominger (SUI) (2/2)	Laurent Jalabert (FRA) (3/7)	Laurent Jalabert (FRA) (4/7)
1996	Fabrizio Guidi (ITA) (1/2)	Erik Zabel (GER) (1/9)	Laurent Jalabert (FRA) (5/7)
1997	Mario Cipollini (ITA) (2/3)	Erik Zabel (GER) (2/9)	Laurent Jalabert (FRA) (6/7)
1998	Mariano Piccoli (ITA) (1/1)	Erik Zabel (GER) (3/9)	Fabrizio Guidi (ITA) (2/2)
1999	Laurent Jalabert (FRA) (7/7)	Erik Zabel (GER) (4/9)	Frank Vandenbroucke (BEL) (1/1)
2000	Dmitri Konyshev (RUS) (1/1)	Erik Zabel (GER) (5/9)	Roberto Heras (ESP) (1/1)
2001	Massimo Strazzer (ITA) (1/1)	Erik Zabel (GER) (6/9)	José María Jiménez (ESP) (1/1)
2002	Mario Cipollini (ITA) (3/3)	Robbie McEwen (AUS) (1/3)	Erik Zabel (GER) (7/9)
2003	Gilberto Simoni (ITA) (1/1)	Baden Cooke (AUS) (1/1)	Erik Zabel (GER) (8/9)
2004	Alessandro Petacchi (ITA) (1/3)	Robbie McEwen (AUS) (2/3)	Erik Zabel (GER) (9/9)
2005	Paolo Bettini (ITA) (1/2)	Thor Hushovd (NOR) (1/3)	Alessandro Petacchi (ITA) (2/3)
2006	Paolo Bettini (ITA) (2/2)	Robbie McEwen (AUS) (3/3)	Thor Hushovd (NOR) (2/3)
2007	No winner^{[A]}	Tom Boonen (BEL) (1/1)	Daniele Bennati (ITA) (1/2)
2008	Daniele Bennati (ITA) (2/2)	Óscar Freire (ESP) (1/1)	Greg Van Avermaet (BEL) (1/1)
2009	Denis Menchov (RUS) (1/1)	Thor Hushovd (NOR) (3/3)	André Greipel (GER) (1/1)
2010	Cadel Evans (AUS) (1/1)	Alessandro Petacchi (ITA) (3/3)	Mark Cavendish (GBR) (1/4)
2011	Michele Scarponi (ITA) (1/1)	Mark Cavendish (GBR) (2/4)	Bauke Mollema (NED) (1/1)
2012	Joaquim Rodríguez (ESP) (1/1)	Peter Sagan (SVK) (1/8)	Alejandro Valverde (ESP) (1/4)
2013	Mark Cavendish (GBR) (3/4)	Peter Sagan (SVK) (2/8)	Alejandro Valverde (ESP) (2/4)
2014	Nacer Bouhanni (FRA) (1/1)	Peter Sagan (SVK) (3/8)	John Degenkolb (GER) (1/1)
2015	Giacomo Nizzolo (ITA) (1/2)	Peter Sagan (SVK) (4/8)	Alejandro Valverde (ESP) (3/4)
2016	Giacomo Nizzolo (ITA) (2/2)	Peter Sagan (SVK) (5/8)	Fabio Felline (ITA) (1/1)
2017	Fernando Gaviria (COL) (1/1)	Michael Matthews (AUS) (1/1)	Chris Froome (GBR) (1/1)
2018	Elia Viviani (ITA) (1/1)	Peter Sagan (SVK) (6/8)	Alejandro Valverde (ESP) (4/4)
2019	Pascal Ackermann (GER) (1/1)	Peter Sagan (SVK) (7/8)	Primož Roglič (SLO) (1/2)
2020	Arnaud Démare (FRA) (1/2)	Sam Bennett (IRL) (1/1)	Primož Roglič (SLO) (2/2)
2021	Peter Sagan (SVK) (8/8)	Mark Cavendish (GBR) (4/4)	Fabio Jakobsen (NED) (1/1)
2022	Arnaud Démare (FRA) (2/2)	Wout van Aert (BEL) (1/2)	Mads Pedersen (DEN) (1/4)
2023	Jonathan Milan (ITA) (1/3)	Jasper Philipsen (BEL) (1/1)	Kaden Groves (AUS) (1/2)
2024	Jonathan Milan (ITA) (2/3)	Biniam Girmay (ERI) (1/1)	Kaden Groves (AUS) (2/2)
2025	Mads Pedersen (DEN) (2/4)	Jonathan Milan (ITA) (3/3)	Mads Pedersen (DEN) (3/4)
2026	Paul Magnier (FRA) (1/1)	Mads Pedersen (DEN) (4/4)	Wout van Aert (BEL) (2/2)
Year	Giro d'Italia	Tour de France	Vuelta a España

A. ^{a} Alessandro Petacchi was the Points leader but tested positive for elevated levels of salbutamol, resulting in a suspension and forfeiture of all results during the event. No alternate winner was declared.

=== Most points jerseys ===
Rank	Rider	Total	Giro	Tour	Vuelta
1	(Germany) Erik Zabel^{[i]}	9	–	6 (1996, 1997, 1998, 1999, 2000, 2001)	3 (2002, 2003, 2004)
2	(Republic of Ireland) Sean Kelly	8	–	4 (1982, 1983, 1985, 1989)	4 (1980, 1985, 1986, 1988)
2	(Slovakia) Peter Sagan	8	1 (2021)	7 (2012, 2013, 2014, 2015, 2016, 2018, 2019)	–
4	(France) Laurent Jalabert	7	1 (1999)	2 (1992, 1995)	4 (1994, 1995, 1996, 1997)
5	(Belgium) Eddy Merckx	6	2 (1968, 1973)	3 (1969, 1971, 1972)	1 (1973)
6	(Uzbekistan) Djamolidine Abdoujaparov	5	1 (1994)	3 (1991, 1993, 1994)	1 (1992)
6	(Netherlands) Jan Janssen	5	–	3 (1964, 1965, 1967)	2 (1967, 1968)
8	(United Kingdom) Mark Cavendish	4	1 (2013)	2 (2011, 2021)	1 (2010)
8	(Belgium) Freddy Maertens	4	–	3 (1976, 1978, 1981)	1 (1977)
8	(Italy) Francesco Moser	4	4 (1976, 1977, 1978, 1982)	–	–
8	(Italy) Giuseppe Saronni	4	4 (1979, 1980, 1981, 1983)	–	–
8	(Spain) Alejandro Valverde	4	–	–	4 (2012, 2013, 2015, 2018)
8	(Denmark) Mads Pedersen	4	1 (2025)	1 (2026)	2 (2022, 2025)

^{i} In 2013, Zabel admitted to taking banned substances from 1996 to 2003, including EPO and the steroid hormone cortisone.

=== Career triples ===
Winning the points classification in each of the three Grand Tours during a cyclist's career is a significant accomplishment. The Tour/Giro/Vuelta triple has been achieved by six riders:

Rider	Total	Giro	Tour	Vuelta
Eddy Merckx (BEL)	6	2 (1968, 1973)	3 (1969, 1971, 1972)	1 (1973)
Djamolidine Abdoujaparov (UZB)	5	1 (1994)	3 (1991, 1993, 1994)	1 (1992)
Laurent Jalabert (FRA)	7	1 (1999)	2 (1992, 1995)	4 (1994, 1995, 1996, 1997)
Alessandro Petacchi (ITA)	3	1 (2004)	1 (2010)	1 (2005)
Mark Cavendish (GBR)	4	1 (2013)	2 (2011, 2021)	1 (2010)
Mads Pedersen (DEN)	4	1 (2025)	1 (2026)	2 (2022, 2025)

=== Natural doubles ===
Winning the points classification in two Grand Tours in a single year is a rare feat.

Giro d'Italia and Tour de France
1994	(Uzbekistan) Djamolidine Abdoujaparov

Tour de France and Vuelta a España
1962	(Germany) Rudi Altig
1967	(Netherlands) Jan Janssen
1985	(Republic of Ireland) Sean Kelly
1995	(France) Laurent Jalabert

Giro d'Italia and Vuelta a España
1973	(Belgium) Eddy Merckx
2025	(Denmark) Mads Pedersen

== Days leading classification ==
In previous tours, sometimes a stage was broken in two (or three). "Days" column gives the number of times the cyclist was a classification leader at the end of the day. Numbers in brackets include split stages.

after the end of 2026 Tour de France

Legend
Current records
Rider was leading in all Grand Tours

Rank	Rider	Days	Leading span	Giro	Tour	Vuelta
1	(Slovakia) Peter Sagan	149	2011–2021	14	130	5
2	(Republic of Ireland) Sean Kelly	148 ^{(151)}	1979–1989	0	65 ^{(67)}	83 ^{(84)}
3	(Germany) Erik Zabel	141 ^{(142)}	1996–2007	0	88 ^{(89)}	53
4	(France) Laurent Jalabert	105	1990–1999	2	25	78
5	(Belgium) Freddy Maertens	93 ^{(102)}	1976–1981	9 ^{(12)}	65 ^{(70)}	19 ^{(20)}
6	(Belgium) Eddy Merckx	84 ^{(91)}	1968–1974 ^{(1975)}	51 ^{(52)}	30 ^{(35)}	3 ^{(4)}
7	(United Kingdom) Mark Cavendish	81	2009–2021	23	43	15
8	(Belgium) Roger De Vlaeminck	76 ^{(81)}	1969–1984	67 ^{(71)}	8 ^{(9)}	1
9	(Italy) Giuseppe Saronni	74 ^{(76)}	1978–1985	74 ^{(76)}	0	0
10	(Soviet Union) / (Uzbekistan) Djamolidine Abdoujaparov	73	1991–1995	3	54	16
11	(Denmark) Mads Pedersen	71	2022–2026	21	18	32

Six other riders were leading points classification in all three Grand Tours: Rudi Altig, Marino Basso, Francesco Moser, Thierry Marie, Alessandro Petacchi and André Greipel. Petacchi is the sole cyclist that did this in one season (2003).

The rider with the most Grand Tour days at the top of the classification in a single calendar year is Mads Pedersen - 39 in 2025.

== See also ==
- Cycling sprinter
- Points classification in the Tour de France
- Points classification in the Giro d'Italia
- Points classification in the Vuelta a España
- List of Grand Tour points classification winners
