= Royal Dutch Cycling Union =

National governing body of cycle racing in the Netherlands

The Royal Dutch Cycling Union or KNWU (in Dutch: Koninklijke Nederlandsche Wielren Unie) is the national governing body of cycle racing in the Netherlands.

The aim of the KNWU is to give adequate support for all types of cycling in the Netherlands.

The KNWU is a member of the UCI and the UEC.

== Events organized by the KNWU ==
- Dutch Cycling Championships
  - Dutch National Road Race Championships
  - Dutch National Time Trial Championships
  - Dutch National Track Championships
- UCI Road World Championships for professionals in 1938, 1948, 1959, 1967, 1979, 1998 and 2012
- UCI Track World Championships for professionals in 1938, 1948, 1959, 1967, 1979, 2011 and 2018
