= Cycling Ireland =

Sports governing body in Ireland

Cycling Ireland (Irish Cycling Federation)
- Sport: Cycle racing
- Abbreviation: CI
- Founded: 1987
- Affiliation: UCI
- Regional affiliation: UEC

Official website
- www.cyclingireland.ie

Cycling Ireland or CI is the operating name of the national governing body of the sport of cycling in the island of Ireland. Formally the body is a charitable company limited by guarantee, the Irish Cycling Federation.

CI is a member of the UCI and the UEC, often called the European Cycling Union. CI is made up of cycling clubs, whose delegates have full voting rights, and whose members can also register individually. There are four provincial associations within CI, to which individual clubs also affiliate: Cycling Connacht, Cycling Leinster, Cycling Munster and Cycling Ulster.

== History ==
The governance of cycling in Ireland has been profoundly affected by the country's turbulent history, particularly in the post-partition era.

=== Early period, the ICA and the GAA ===
In 1878, competitive and team cycling in Ireland was administered by the Irish Cycling Association (ICA). In 1884 the Gaelic Athletic Association (GAA) was formed to preserve native pastimes, and cycling began to feature at GAA meetings. The ICA was composed mainly of unionists and moderate nationalists from urban areas, whereas the GAA cyclists were mostly from rural areas and tended to hold strong nationalist views. Conflict arose between the two rival groups.

Ireland was partitioned in 1921 and the Irish Free State was established in 1922. The National Athletic and Cycling Association of Ireland (NACA or NACAI) was formed to administer cycling and athletics, retaining strong links with the GAA. The new body suffered disputes between its central council representatives from Northern Ireland and those from the south.

In 1937, administration of cycling was given to the National Cycling Association (NCA), an all-Ireland organisation "carved out" from within the NACA, and like the NACA and the GAA, with a 32-county purview.

In 1947 the world governing sport of cycling, the Union Cycliste Internationale (UCI), decreed that the NCA should confine its area of jurisdiction to the 26 counties of what was to shortly become (in April 1949) the Republic of Ireland. The NCA refused and as a result was expelled from the UCI.

Within Northern Ireland, cyclists were divided largely according to their social and political affiliations.

=== CRÉ and the ICF ===
In 1949, several Irish cycling clubs broke away from the NCA and formed a cycling governing body that would restrict its area of jurisdiction to state of Ireland, as directed by the UCI, Cumann Rothaiochta na hÉireann (CRÉ). In the same year, a breakaway group in Northern Ireland, the Northern Ireland Cycling Federation, successfully applied for official recognition to the UCI and also formed an association with the British Cycling Federation.

In 1955, participation at international events had become a grievance of the nationalists. At the world amateur championships, an unofficial NCA team tried to line up alongside the official (CRÉ/NICF) Irish team, leading to fighting.

CRÉ was replaced by the Irish Cycling Federation (ICF) in 1967. NACA remained in existence, and its cycling branch, the NCA, continued to organise cycling north and south of the border, as well as continuing its association with the GAA.

=== Towards cooperation ===
Since there were now two official national governing bodies north and south of the border, the two bodies co-operated to enter all-Ireland teams in international competitions.

In 1972 the ICF sent a team to represent Ireland at the Munich Olympics. The NCA sent a squad selected from the entire 32 counties who ended up attacking some of the members of the ICF team during the road race.

=== The Tripartite Committee ===
In 1979 the Irish Cycling Tripartite Committee (ICTC) was set up between the ICF, NCA, and NICF as a forum within which differences between the associations could be worked out and joint racing ventures organised. The Northern Ireland Cycling Federation (NICF) continued to affiliate to the world body (now the International Amateur Cycling Federation or FIAC) as an independent entity and to pay its own fees.

Regulations enacted in 1986 stated that only one fee will be accepted from each designated nation, and the NICF's fee was hence rejected, with Irish affiliation to the FIAC passing to the ICTC. This led to proposals for amalgamation of the three governing bodies. This proved acceptable to both the ICF and the NCA, but caused a split within the NICF. A vote to accept the merger was challenged in the High Court where it was overturned.

=== FIC ===
In 1987 the IFC, NCA and Irish Cycling Tripartite Committee formed the Federation of Irish Cyclists (FIC). NICF members who supported the change (nearly 75% of members, and 70% of the clubs) formed a new body, the Ulster Cycling Federation (UCF), which affiliated to the FIC, which was then admitted to the FIAC in September 1988 as the sole governing body for the island of Ireland. In Northern Ireland, cycling continued to be split between two groups. Funding from the Sports Council for Northern Ireland was channelled to the officially recognised UCF, whereas Unionist local councils chose to support the NICF, again illustrating how sport can become bound up in Northern Ireland's political conflict.

==== NICF ====
NICF members felt that, as British citizens, they were entitled to join the BCF. However, for several years the UCI blocked this, stating that the NICF riders should take licences from the FIC. In 1992, the UCI relented and permitted NICF members to race under BCF licences. However, the NICF was not permitted to take any fuller part in the BCF, and has to occupy a semi-detached status. The UCI unsuccessfully attempted to further reconcile the NICF and the FIC.

In 1995 the annual meeting of the BCF granted the NICF the same status as regional governing bodies in Scotland and Wales, and in 2001 the BCF placed the Tour of the North, an Ulster-based race, on its Premier Calendar. This proved too much for the UCI, which resolved at its 2002 congress in Zolder to restrict the actions of the BCF and NICF in Northern Ireland, and to restate that the FIC was the sole body for cycling in the entire island.

An agreement to implement the UCI ruling was reached in 2004 with British Cycling (the new name for the BCF) and Cycling Ireland (the new name for the ICF).

In 2006 the NICF held a special general meeting to amalgamate with Cycling Ulster, starting in 2007, and operating as a promotional group. All NICF clubs would switch affiliation from British Cycling to Cycling Ireland. Cycling Ireland members would still be able to opt for their preferred nationality on the licence, preserving political and cultural identities.

== Regional bodies ==
Cycling Ireland governs the sport on a provincial basis, with four sub bodies affiliating to the national body. These are Cycling Ulster, Cycling Leinster, Cycling Connacht, and Cycling Munster.

== Name ==
Cycling Ireland is the trading and operating name of the body formally known as the Irish Cycling Federation.

=== Sprocket Rocket (launched in 2010) ===
Sprocket Rocket was launched at the end of 2010 with the aim of teaching children better cycling skills, setting them up for a lifetime of enjoyment from their bike.

=== Bike for Life (launched in 2013) ===
This is a cycling programme that caters for all cyclists, from the person who has just rediscovered their bike, to riders who want to take on greater challenges. Delivered by coaches, the 10-week programme brings the cyclist on a journey of learning, where they are educated on the various skills, aspects and components of cycling in a safe environment.

Bike for Life is sponsored by the HSE, the national health authority, under their Get Ireland Active initiative, as well as receiving funding from Women in Sport. One of the aims of Bike for Life is to close the gender gap in cycling through the creation of "Meet and Spin" groups of people of similar speeds and ability. Matt Cooper from Today FM and international cyclist Caroline Ryan are the two ambassadors for the programme. At the Launch of Bike for Life last month Matt Cooper said "Bike for Life should transform how people view cycling. It's a new programme that connects people who want to improve their cycling, no matter what level they are at, and I am really happy to endorse it".

=== Gearing Up Off-Road (launched in 2011) ===
This is a beginner's mountain bike programme that can be delivered in a variety of ways, whether it is a 10-week programme, or run over an intensive weekend. Throughout Gearing Up Off-Road the rider is brought through various steps, learning specific MTB skills from qualified coaches and Trail Cycle Leaders. This programme can be delivered in a range of settings, from secondary school environments to adventure centres. With the main focus of Gearing Up Off-Road being on the acquisition of skills, this can be delivered in any setting, from a mountain bike trail to a field, with props to replicate the off-road environment. Every session includes a ride out after the coaching session.

=== Talent Team 2020 ===
Youth Cycling has a strong tradition in Ireland, with riders being encouraged to participate in all disciplines to ensure they become more rounded riders.

To assist in the development of skills, knowledge and competence in young riders, the Talent Team 2020 was born. The aim of this development training and racing programme is to nurture and develop young talent at this early age, in order to produce medal winning squads at the 2020 Olympic Games.

FBD is the sponsor of the Male Talent Team 2020, which is managed by Martin O'Loughlin. Neenan Travel is the sponsor of the Female Talent Team 2020, which is managed by Orla Hendron.

Two of professional cycling's top riders in the 1980s, Sean Kelly and Stephen Roche, have had a profound effect on Irish cycling. Cycling Ireland's headquarters is called Kelly Roche House in their honour.

=== Previous programmes ===
==== Sean Kelly Cycling Academy (2005) ====
In 2005, Cycling Ireland opened the Sean Kelly Cycling Academy, a facility in Merchtem, Belgium as a base for Irish cyclists on the continent where they can gain experience of racing at a much higher standard than in they would in Ireland. It gives Irish riders access to UCI ranked events where they compete against elite professional riders. This facility was partly funded by the Irish Sports Council.

Sean Kelly remained involved in the promotion of Irish cycling by working in the management of the new Irish continental team, initially known as Sean Kelly ACLVB–M Donnelly and later as An Post–Chain Reaction.

== See also ==
- I BIKE Dublin
