= Colombian Cycling Federation =

National governing body of cycle racing in Colombia

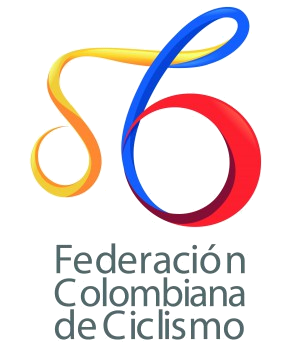
FCC logo

The Colombian Cycling Federation or FCC (Spanish: Federación Colombiana de Ciclismo) is the national governing body of cycle racing in Colombia.

The FCC is a member of the UCI and COPACI.
