= Swiss Cycling =

Swiss cycling organization

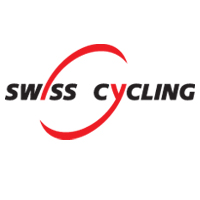
Swiss Cycling logo

Swiss Cycling is the national governing body of cycle racing in Switzerland.

The organisation is a member of the UCI and the UEC.
