= Slovenian Cycling Federation =

National governing body of cycle racing in Slovenia

KZS logo

The Slovenian Cycling Federation or KZS (in Slovenian: Kolesarska Zveza Slovenije) is the national governing body of cycle racing in Slovenia.

The KZS is a member of the UCI and the UEC.
