= French Cycling Federation =

National governing body of cycle racing in France

- Sport: Cycling
- Jurisdiction: France
- Abbreviation: FFC
- Founded: 1881
- Affiliation: UCI
- Regional affiliation: UEC
- Headquarters: Montigny-le-Bretonneux
- President: Michel Callot

Official website
- www.ffc.fr
- (France)

The Fédération Française de Cyclisme (FFC) or French Cycling Federation is the national governing body of cycle racing in France.

The FFC is a member of the UCI and the UEC. In February 2009, David Lappartient was elected for a four-year term as president.

== History ==
The Union Vélocipédique Française (UVF) was the predecessor of the FFC. It was founded on 6 February 1881 in Paris at the Café Le Marengo by delegates of ten cycling clubs, who on the same day decided to create a national championship race of 10 km. The first president was Parisian Paul Devilliers, and from the start the UVF admitted professional riders.

The UVF was reformed on 20 December 1940, becoming the FFC.

== Organisation ==
The executive board is composed of a president, six vice-presidents, a general secretary, and a general treasurer.

=== Executive board ===
- President : David Lapartient
- General secretary : Patrick Roy
- General treasurer : Pierre Pouyet
