= Royal Spanish Cycling Federation =

National governing body of cycle racing in Spain

- Sport: Cycle racing
- Abbreviation: RFEF
- Founded: 1896
- Affiliation: UCI
- Regional affiliation: UEC
- Headquarters: Madrid, Ferraz, 16. 5º. 28008
- President: José Luis López Cerrón

Official website
- rfec.com
- (Spain)

The Royal Spanish Cycling Federation or RFEC (in Spanish: Real Federación Española de Ciclismo) is the national governing body of cycle racing in Spain. As of 2023, the federation has 3,682 registered clubs and 69,805 federated cyclists.

== History ==
The organization was originally founded as the (Spanish: Unión Velocipédica Española or UVE).

At the beginning of 1898, journalist Narciso Masferrer used Los Deportes, which he had founded the year before, to became the main propagandist of the Catalan Cycling Union (Spanish: Unión Velocipédica Catalan or UVC), chaired by the doctor Manuel Duran i Ventosa, who created this entity to compete with the Madrid-based UVE. When the UVC was officially constituted in May 1898, Masferrer was elected its “publicist secretary”. Years later, in 1910, when Masferrer was already an established leader of Spanish cycling, he would make a public confession of his remorse for having supported a dissident entity. At the beginning of 1899, however, both the UVC and the UVE stood on the verge of collapse as a result of Spain's colonial disaster at the end of the Spanish–American War, and when a debacle in the UVE was sensed, Masferrer immediately began to apply for union, promoting the merger between the two federations through the pages of Los Deportes and through negotiations between the leaders of both entities. This campaign reached its peak with a meeting at the restaurant Ca l'Anguilero in Llobregat, convened by Los Deportes on 9 April "to seal the union that exists among all", which was attended by more than 240 cyclists. Despite his best efforts, however, Masferrer was unable to prevent the aforementioned debacle of the UVE (May 1899), which resulted in the annulment of their meeting and the resignation of the Madrid committee from the Spanish union. From this moment on, Masferrer became the leader of the movement to save the UVE, always using the pages of Los Deportes to speak, and following an appeal on 11 June, Masferrer held a negotiation with the president of the UVE, Claudi de Rialp, and the president of the Catalan committee of the Spanish Union, the architect Bonaventura Pollés, which lead to the seizure of federative power by these men and the transfer from the headquarters of the UVE to Barcelona, which materialized at the beginning of July 1899. This entire situation gave Masferrer a triumphant entry into the unionist movement, profiling himself as the true savior of the UVE through his efforts and his journalistic campaigns. At first, he remained in the background, behind Rialp and Pollés, but he soon came to the front. In fact, some of the most important decisions of the UVE congress of December 1899 are the result of Masferrer's proposals, and his growing role within the federation is immediately made clear when he is appointed delegate, that is, the spokesman for the UVE congress held in Barcelona in December 1900, before being elected the president a year later, replacing Claudi de Rialp.

== Scope ==
It covers the disciplines of road racing, track cycling, cyclo-cross, BMX, mountain biking and cycle speedway.

The Federation is a member of the Union Cycliste Internationale and the Union Européenne de Cyclisme. It is based in Madrid.

== See also ==
- List of cycling races in Spain
