= Italian Cycling Federation =

National governing body of cycle racing in Italy

Federazione Ciclistica Italiana
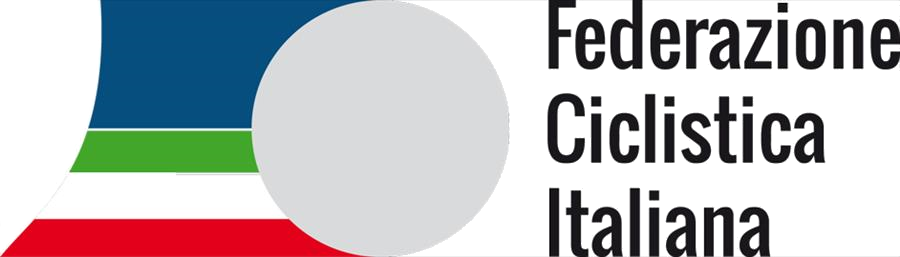
- Sport: Cycling
- Jurisdiction: Italy
- Abbreviation: FCI
- Founded: 1894
- Affiliation: UCI
- Affiliation date: 1900
- Headquarters: Rome
- Location: Italy
- President: Cordiano Dagnoni
- Coach: Davide Cassani

Official website
- www.federciclismo.it

The Italian Cycling Federation or FCI (in Italian: Federazione Ciclistica Italiana) is the national governing body of cycle racing in Italy.

The FCI is a member of the UCI and the UEC.

== History ==
The Italian Cycling Federation was founded, under the name Unione Velocipedistica Italiana, in Pavia on December 6, 1885 through the union of 17 cycling clubs that had previously operated independently in Italy. In the second half of 1884, a year before the birth of the FCI, there were 25 regularly established cycling societies: the oldest of these was the Veloce Club Fiorentino in Florence, established in 1870, while Milan and Turin each hosted three cycling societies.

An initial attempt to unite and coordinate the activities of these sports clubs was made on the occasion of the competitions staged by the Sports Committee of the Italian General Exhibition in Turin, scheduled for August 23–25, 1884. At the initiative of lawyer Brignone, secretary of the VC Torino, representatives of twelve societies met and, after a complex and contentious meeting, signed minutes specifying, among other things, that the Unione Velocipedistica Italiana had been founded on August 26, 1884. This organization, however, never operated, having failed to resolve certain issues then detriments, such as issues related to professionalism, amateur activity and the headquarters of the fledgling organization.

In 1992 the Organisation stopped many riders from turning professional before the Olympic games road race as only amateurs could compete.

== See also ==
- Italy national cycling team
