= Babylon (disambiguation) =

Babylon was the capital city of Babylonia in ancient Mesopotamia, Middle East.

Babylon or Babylone may also refer to:

== Places ==
- Babil Governorate (or Babylon Province), Iraq
- Babylon University, in Al Hillah, Iraq
- Babylon (Egypt), an ancient city and Roman legion camp in Egypt
  - Cairo, often referred to as Babylon in Medieval literature
- Babylon (Domažlice District), a municipality and village in the Czech Republic
- Babylon, Illinois, a community in the US state of Illinois
- Babylon, New York, a town in the US
  - Babylon (village), New York, a village in the town of Babylon
    - Babylon station, Long Island Railroad station in village of Babylon
- Babylon Istanbul, a music venue in Istanbul, Turkey
- Sèvres–Babylone station, a station on lines 10 and 12 of the Paris Metro

== Religion ==
- Babylon, in rabbinic literature often used to refer to the Jewish diaspora, especially the historic Babylonian captivity
- Diocese of Babylon (disambiguation)
  - Patriarch of Babylon of the Church of the East
- Babylon, a literal and figurative term used to refer to the city of Babylon, to Rome or the Roman Empire, or to evil
  - Whore of Babylon or "Babylon the Great", a Christian allegorical figure from the Book of Revelation in the Bible
  - Babylon, a term used in the Rastafari movement for any politically or economically oppressive society

== People ==
- Brian Babylon, American comedian and radio personality
- Babylon (singer), a South Korean R&B singer

== Arts and entertainment ==
=== Film and television ===
==== Film ====
- Babylon (1980 film), a British film by Franco Rosso
- Babylon (1986 film), a British TV animated short in the Sweet Disaster series
- Babylon (1998 film), a Dutch film by Eddy Terstall
- Babylon (2022 film), an American film by Damien Chazelle

==== Television ====
===== Episodes =====
- "Babylon" (Carnivàle)
- "Babylon" (Mad Men)
- "Babylon" (Stargate SG-1)
- "Babylon" (The X-Files)

===== Other uses in television =====
- Babylon (TV series), a 2014 British comedy-drama
- Babylon (anime), a 2019–2020 Japanese series based on the novel series (see below)
- Babylon, a nightclub in the American version of Queer as Folk
- Babylon, a nightclub in the British version of Queer as Folk

=== Literature ===
- Babylon (novel series), a 2015–2017 Japanese novel series by Mado Nozaki and Zain
- Babylon (Pelevin novel), or Generation "П", a 1999 novel by Viktor Pelevin
- Babylon, part one of the 2009 limited series Herogasm as part of The Boys comic book franchise
- Babylon (Babylone), a 2016 novel by Yasmina Reza

=== Music ===
==== Albums ====
- Babylon (Dr. John album) or the title song, 1969
- Babylon (Skindred album) or the title song, 2002
- Babylon (Ten album), 2000
- Babylon (W.A.S.P. album), 2009
- Babylon (William Control album), 2014
- Babylon, by Die Amigos, 2019
- Babylon, by OBK, 2003

==== Songs ====
- "Babylon" (ballad), a Child (traditional) ballad
- "Babylon" (David Gray song), 1999
- "Babylon" (Lady Gaga song), 2020
- "Babylon" (Taylor Swift song), 2026
- "Babylon", by 5 Seconds of Summer from Youngblood, 2018
- "Babylon", by Adam Again from Ten Songs by Adam Again, 1988
- "Babylon", by Angus and Julia Stone from Chocolates and Cigarettes, 2006
- "Babylon", by Aphrodite's Child from 666, 1972
- "Babylon", by Backyard Babies from Total 13, 1998
- "Babylon", by Bizzy Bone and Baby Phil from For the Fans Vol. 1, 2005
- "Babylon", by Circle of Dust from Disengage, 1998
- "Babylon", by Deathstars from Night Electric Night, 2009
- "Babylon", by Delain from We Are the Others, 2012
- "Babylon", by DJ Quik, Bizzy Bone, and BlaKKazz K.K. from The Book of David, 2011
- "Babylon", by Don McLean from American Pie, 1971
- "Babylon", by Edguy from Theater of Salvation, 1999
- "Babylon", by Faster Pussycat from Faster Pussycat, 1987
- "Babylon", by Haste the Day from Dreamer, 2008
- "Babylon", by Ill Bill from The Hour of Reprisal, 2008
- "Babylon", by Joey Bada$$ from All-Amerikkkan Badass, 2017
- "Babylon", by the New York Dolls from Too Much Too Soon, 1974
- "Babylon", by Oneohtrix Point Never from Age Of, 2018
- "Babylon", by Outkast from ATLiens, 1996
- "Babylon", by Pop Will Eat Itself from Dos Dedos Mis Amigos, 1994
- "Babylon", by Prince Ital Joe and Marky Mark from Life in the Streets, 1994
- "Babylon", by Riot from Nightbreaker, 1993
- "Babylon", by RX Bandits from Progress, 2001
- "Babylon", by Scars on Broadway from Scars on Broadway, 2008
- "Babylon", by Soulfly from Dark Ages, 2005
- "Babylon", by Starship from No Protection, 1987
- "Babylon", by Stratovarius from Episode, 1996
- "Babylon", by SZA from Z, 2014
- "Babylon", by the Tea Party from Transmission, 1997

==== Other uses in music ====
- Babylon (opera), 2012, by Jörg Widmann
- Babylon (band), an American progressive rock band
- Babylone (band), an Algerian pop band

== Brands and enterprises ==
- Babylon (software), a translation program, including the Babylon Toolbar, a browser hijacker
- Babylon Health, a British provider of health apps
- Babylon.js, a real time 3D-engine for web browsers
- Kino Babylon, a cinema in Berlin
- Babylon, a darknet market seized by law enforcement in July 2015

== Other uses ==
- Project Babylon, a former Iraqi project for the construction of superguns

== See also ==
- Babel (disambiguation), the name used in the Arabic Qur'an and the Hebrew Bible for the city of Babylon
- Babylonia (disambiguation)
- Rivers of Babylon (disambiguation)
