= Diego Ulissi =

Italian road bicycle racer

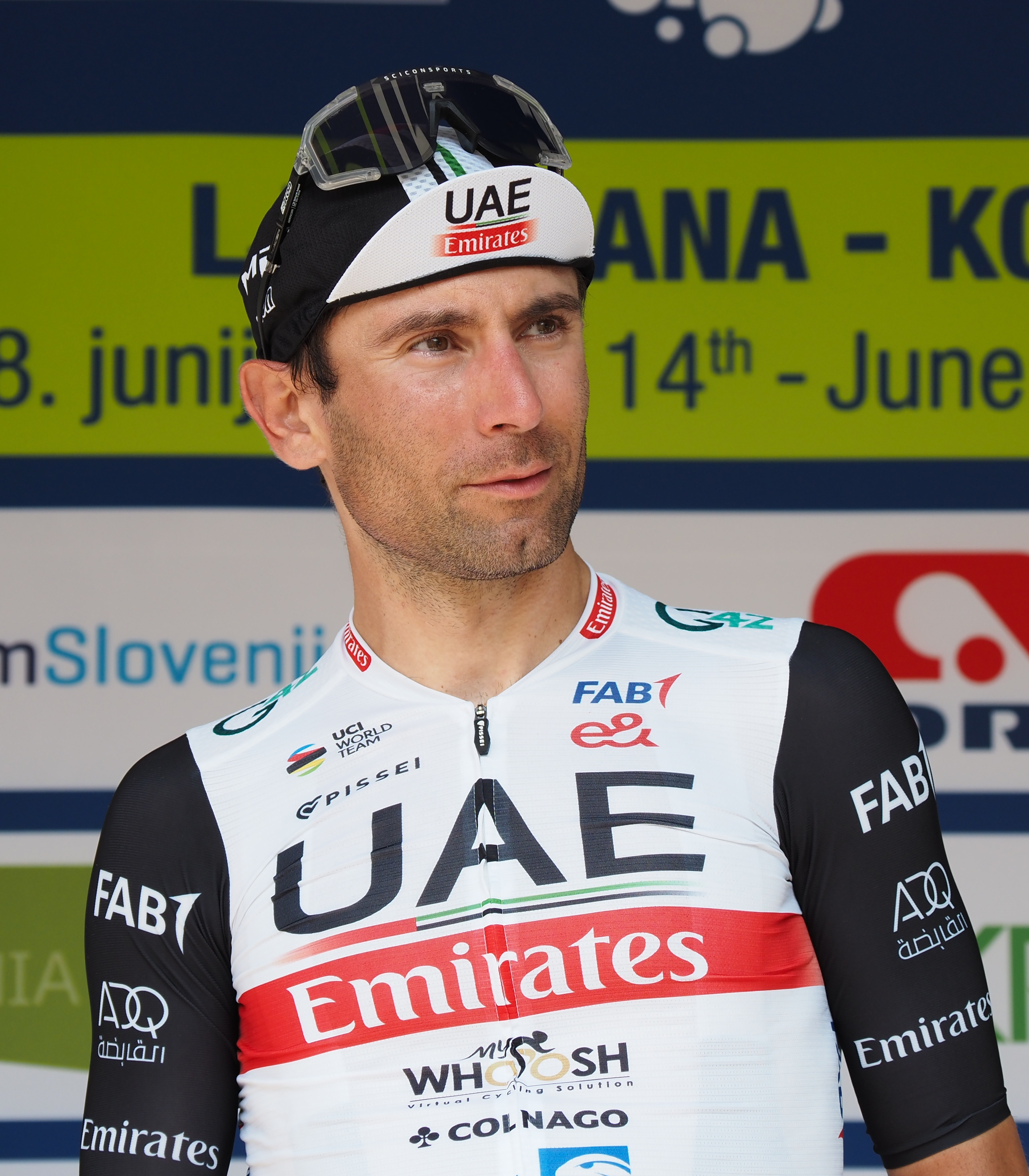
- Ulissi at the 2023 Tour of Slovenia

Personal information
- Full name: Diego Ulissi
- Born: 15 July 1989 (age 37) Cecina, Italy
- Height: 1.75 m (5 ft 9 in)
- Weight: 61 kg (134 lb)

Cycling career
- Sport: Cycling
- Current team: XDS Astana Team
- Discipline: Road
- Role: Rider
- Rider type: Puncheur; All-rounder

Amateur teams
- 2008: Seano Vangi-Molino di Ferro
- 2009: Hopplà-Seano-Bellissima

Professional teams
- 2010–2024: Lampre–Farnese Vini
- 2025–: XDS Astana Team

Major wins
- Grand Tours Giro d'Italia 8 individual stages (2011, 2014, 2015, 2016, 2020) Stage races Tour de Luxembourg (2020) Tour of Slovenia (2019) Tour of Turkey (2017) Single-day races and Classics GP de Montréal (2017) GP Industria & Artigianato (2022) Milano–Torino (2013) Giro dell'Emilia (2013)

Diego Ulissi (born 15 July 1989) is an Italian road bicycle racer, who currently rides for UCI WorldTeam XDS Astana Team.

== Career ==
Ulissi is an all-round cyclist who often wins stages and one-day races from breakaways and over hilly terrain.

Born in Cecina, Ulissi won the Junior World Road Race Championships in 2006 and 2007. He is the second cyclist ever – after Giuseppe Palumbo – to achieve two consecutive World Junior Road titles. He was awarded stage 17 of the 2011 Giro d'Italia after Giovanni Visconti was relegated for improper sprinting.

=== Lampre–Farnese Vini (2010–present) ===
In June 2011, he recorded his first major professional victories. He won Stage 17 in his first appearance at the Giro d'Italia after Giovanni Visconti was relegated for improper sprinting. Ulissi and Visconti were part of a breakaway that survived to the end of the hilly stage, and Visconti shoved Ulissi during their sprint to the finish line. Ulissi later won the queen stage and the overall classification in that year's Tour of Slovenia.

During the 2012 season, Ulissi again raced the Giro d'Italia, placing fourth in the young rider competition.

Ulissi took his second World Tour-level win during the first stage of the 2013 Tour de Pologne, out-sprinting Darwin Atapuma and Rafał Majka from a breakaway group of 15 riders. He then won three Italian classic races in the fall. In Milano–Torino, Ulissi attacked away from a small group of favourites, including defending champion Alberto Contador, on the final climb to take victory. He won an uphill sprint in Coppa Sabatini a week later. Finally, days after, Ulissi again jumped away from the leading group in the closing metres of the Giro dell'Emilia to take victory.

Ulissi took more stage victories in 2014, despite underperforming during the spring classics. He won the second stage of the Tour Down Under, launching an early sprint to beat stage favourite Simon Gerrans. Ulissi won two stages in the Giro d'Italia. On Stage 5, he launched a late attack against a group of stage and general classification favourites, and he narrowly beat the Giro's overall contenders to the finish of the race's first major mountain stage.

After serving a doping-related suspension that ended in March 2015, Ulissi came back to win Stage 7 of the Giro d'Italia in Fiuggi. In 2016, Ulissi returned to the Giro d'Italia and won two stages. On Stage 4, Ulissi broke away from the leading group to beat Tom Dumoulin by five seconds. On Stage 11, he out-sprinted race leader Bob Jungels in the closing metres of the stage. Ulissi won the first individual time trial of his professional career on Stage 2 of the Tour of Slovenia, beating eventual general classification winner Rein Taaramäe over a short and hilly parcours. That August, Ulissi took the third stage and the overall classification at the Czech Cycling Tour.

In June 2017, he was named in the startlist for the Tour de France. He out-sprinted Jesús Herrada and Tom-Jelte Slagter to win the Grand Prix Cycliste de Montréal, his first World Tour-level win in the 2017 season. Ulissi won the general classification in the Presidential Tour of Turkey, his first overall victory in a World Tour stage race. In that race, he took the leader's jersey in a solo hilltop stage victory on Stage 4.

Ulissi won Stage 5 of the 2018 Tour de Suisse, overpowering Enric Mas in a sprint to the line.

In 2019, Ulissi took victory in the Gran Premio di Lugano in Switzerland. He also won Stage 3 and the general classification in the Tour of Slovenia and the test event for the road race at the 2020 Summer Olympics in Tokyo.

== Doping ==
In June 2014 it was announced that Ulissi had failed a drug test on Stage 11 of that year's Giro d'Italia. He tested positive for the asthma drug salbutamol, which is found in Ventolin. Ulissi had received permission to use Ventolin to treat a bronchospasm. However, the test indicated that he had almost twice the permitted concentration of salbutamol in his urine. He had also received paracetamol from a race doctor after he was involved in a crash during the stage.

Both Ulissi and the Lampre–Merida team doctor denied using his inhaler to gain a competitive advantage, claiming that Ulissi had taken only two puffs before the start of the stage. Lampre–Merida and the head coach of Italy's national team, Davide Cassani, expressed support for Ulissi. Nevertheless, he was provisionally suspended from Lampre–Merida and did not attend the Italian national team's training camp after the positive test was announced.

Ulissi appealed to the Union Cycliste Internationale (UCI) for a controlled excretion study, as he could face a two-year suspension from racing. After some delay, the UCI passed Ulissi's case to Swiss Cycling (Ulissi resides outside of Lugano) to conduct a disciplinary hearing. Ulissi argued that his crash during the Giro's Stage 11 could have caused higher-than-expected levels of salbutamol. After briefly suspending Ulissi when news of his positive test broke, Lampre–Merida announced that Ulissi could return to race in time for a string of Italian one-day races, including Tre Valli Varesine and Coppa Ugo Agostoni. But when Ulissi's case was passed to Swiss Cycling, the team backtracked, citing "internal sanitary rules of the team and the rules of the Mouvement pour un cyclisme crédible (MPCC)." The Swiss Olympic Association agreed with Ulissi's defence, that he used salbutamol negligently and not in order to cheat. He therefore received a reduced nine-month suspension, ending in March 2015.

The suspension created a potential conflict between Lampre–Merida and Ulissi over the rider's contract. The team was a member of the Mouvement pour un cyclisme crédible (MPCC), a voluntary association of teams working to promote clean cycling. MPCC rules prohibited a member team from signing a rider within two years of that rider serving a doping-related suspension of longer than six months. The rules could have prevented Lampre–Merida from allowing Ulissi to return to racing after his suspension; however, because Ulissi already had a contract with the team, he could sue if Lampre–Merida ended his contract early. The MPCC at first allowed Lampre–Merida to keep its contract with Ulissi to avoid legal difficulties, and Ulissi returned to racing for the Tour of the Basque Country. However, the MPCC and Lampre–Merida continued sparring over Ulissi's participation in races, prompting the team to withdraw from the MPCC in March 2015.

== Personal life ==
Ulissi was born in Cecina in 1989. He was named Diego Armando after Diego Maradona, his father's favourite football player. Ulissi's mother, Donatella, works at a winery, while his father was a mountain bike racer. His father encouraged his passion for cycling, and Ulissi entered his first race in 1996.

Ulissi lives outside of Lugano, Switzerland with his wife, Arianna, and daughters, Lia and Anna. He missed Anna's birth in March 2020 while in quarantine at the UAE Tour after four riders on UAE Team Emirates tested positive for COVID-19.

== Major results ==
2006
1st Road race, UCI Junior World Championships
2nd Overall Giro della Lunigiana

1st Stage 3

2007
1st Road race, UCI Junior World Championships
3rd Time trial, National Junior Road Championships
4th Overall Giro della Lunigiana
8th Time trial, UEC European Junior Road Championships
2009
3rd GP Capodarco
2010 (1 pro win)
1st Gran Premio Industria e Commercio di Prato
4th Overall Brixia Tour
9th Giro di Toscana
2011 (3)
1st Overall Tour of Slovenia

1st Stage 2

1st Stage 17 Giro d'Italia
2nd Overall Settimana Internazionale di Coppi e Bartali

1st Young rider classification

3rd Overall Brixia Tour
2012 (3)
1st Gran Premio Industria e Commercio Artigianato Carnaghese
2nd Milano–Torino
3rd Overall Settimana Internazionale di Coppi e Bartali

1st Points classification
1st Young rider classification
1st Stages 3 & 4

6th Grand Prix Cycliste de Québec
9th La Flèche Wallonne
10th Clásica de San Sebastián
2013 (6)
1st Overall Settimana Internazionale di Coppi e Bartali

1st Stage 2

1st Milano–Torino
1st Coppa Sabatini
1st Giro dell'Emilia
1st Stage 1 Tour de Pologne
2nd Gran Premio Città di Camaiore
2nd Gran Premio della Costa Etruschi
4th Trofeo Laigueglia
6th Overall Bayern Rundfahrt

1st Young rider classification

7th Overall Paris–Nice
2014 (4)
1st Gran Premio Città di Camaiore
Giro d'Italia

1st Stages 5 & 8

3rd Overall Tour Down Under

1st Stage 2

3rd Gran Premio di Lugano
5th Trofeo Laigueglia
2015 (2)
1st Memorial Marco Pantani
1st Stage 7 Giro d'Italia
2nd Japan Cup
3rd Road race, National Road Championships
5th Overall Tour of Slovenia
5th Overall Abu Dhabi Tour
5th Grand Prix Cycliste de Québec
6th Overall Tour de Pologne
2016 (6)
1st Overall Czech Cycling Tour

1st Stage 3

1st Circuito de Getxo
Giro d'Italia

1st Stages 4 & 11

1st Stage 3 (ITT) Tour of Slovenia
2nd Coppa Ugo Agostoni
2nd Gran Premio di Lugano
2nd Tre Valli Varesine
3rd Overall Tour du Haut Var
3rd Overall Abu Dhabi Tour
3rd Gran Premio della Costa Etruschi
3rd Grand Prix Cycliste de Montréal
5th Milano–Torino
6th Trofeo Laigueglia
7th Strade Bianche
7th Amstel Gold Race
7th Grand Prix Cycliste de Québec
8th La Flèche Wallonne
8th Giro dell'Emilia
9th Road race, UEC European Road Championships
2017 (4)
1st Overall Tour of Turkey

1st Stage 4

1st Grand Prix Cycliste de Montréal
1st Gran Premio della Costa Etruschi
2nd Road race, National Road Championships
2nd Memorial Marco Pantani
4th Coppa Sabatini
4th Tre Valli Varesine
5th Overall Tour Down Under
7th Giro dell'Emilia
10th La Flèche Wallonne
2018 (1)
4th Overall Tour Down Under
4th Overall Tour of Turkey
4th Gran Premio di Lugano
7th Overall Abu Dhabi Tour
7th Grand Prix Cycliste de Montréal
9th Overall Tour de Suisse

1st Stage 5

10th Giro della Toscana
2019 (3)
1st Overall Tour of Slovenia

1st Stage 3

1st Gran Premio di Lugano
1st Tokyo 2020 Test Event
2nd Grand Prix Cycliste de Montréal
3rd Overall Tour de Pologne
3rd La Flèche Wallonne
4th Road race, National Road Championships
4th Grand Prix Cycliste de Québec
5th Overall Deutschland Tour
6th Giro dell'Emilia
9th Overall Tour Down Under
2020 (5)
1st Overall Tour de Luxembourg

1st Points classification
1st Stages 1 & 4

Giro d'Italia

1st Stages 2 & 13
Held after Stages 2–3

2nd Overall Tour Down Under
2nd Gran Piemonte
3rd Giro dell'Emilia
4th Overall Settimana Internazionale di Coppi e Bartali
5th Overall Tour de Pologne
8th Giro di Lombardia
9th Overall UAE Tour
2021 (4)
1st Overall Settimana Ciclistica Italiana

1st Stages 1 & 4

2nd Overall Tour of Slovenia

1st Stage 4

3rd Giro della Toscana
4th Overall Tour de Pologne
5th Gran Premio di Lugano
6th Veneto Classic
7th Milano–Torino
7th Giro dell'Appennino
8th Giro dell'Emilia
2022 (2)
1st GP Industria & Artigianato di Larciano
2nd Overall Tour du Limousin

1st Stage 3

6th Overall Étoile de Bessèges
6th Overall Settimana Internazionale di Coppi e Bartali
6th Giro del Veneto
7th Trofeo Laigueglia
8th Grand Prix La Marseillaise
9th Overall Tour de Pologne
9th Grand Prix Cycliste de Québec
10th Grand Prix of Aargau Canton
10th Veneto Classic
2023 (1)
3rd Overall Tour of Slovenia
5th Overall Tour de Luxembourg
5th Overall Tour of Oman

1st Stage 4

5th GP Industria & Artigianato di Larciano
6th Prueba Villafranca de Ordizia
6th Muscat Classic
6th Coppa Agostoni
9th Trofeo Laigueglia
9th Circuito de Getxo
2024 (3)
1st Overall Tour of Austria

1st Points classification
1st Stage 3

2nd Overall Tour de Pologne

1st Sprints classification

2nd Overall Czech Tour
3rd Overall Settimana Internazionale di Coppi e Bartali

1st Stage 2

3rd GP Industria & Artigianato di Larciano
3rd Giro dell'Appennino
4th Overall Tour of Oman
4th Overall Tour de Hongrie
4th Milano–Torino
6th Overall Giro d'Abruzzo
8th Giro della Toscana
2025 (1)
1st Giro dell'Appennino
3rd Veneto Classic
4th Overall International Tour of Hellas

1st Points classification

4th Prueba Villafranca de Ordizia
4th Muscat Classic
6th Memorial Marco Pantani
7th Trofeo Serra Tramuntana
8th GP Gippingen
9th Clásica Terres de l'Ebre
Giro d'Italia

Held after Stage 8

2026
4th Trofeo Laigueglia
8th Overall Giro d'Abruzzo
9th Veneto Classic
10th Overall Settimana Internazionale di Coppi e Bartali

=== Grand Tour general classification results timeline ===
Grand Tour	2011	2012	2013	2014	2015	2016	2017	2018	2019	2020	2021	2022	2023
Giro d'Italia	41	21	—	DNF	64	21	—	28	42	38	17	37	28
Tour de France	—	—	—	—	—	—	39	—	—	—	—	—	—
Vuelta a España	—	—	32	—	—	—	—	—	—	—	—	—	—

=== Classics results timeline ===
Monument	2010	2011	2012	2013	2014	2015	2016	2017	2018	2019	2020	2021	2022	2023	2024
Milan–San Remo	—	140	DNF	DNF	DNF	—	58	40	103	72	—	—	24	72	—
Tour of Flanders	Has not contested during his career														
Paris–Roubaix	Has not contested during his career														
Liège–Bastogne–Liège	—	76	78	20	66	DNF	55	30	28	39	—	—	22	—	DNF
Giro di Lombardia	DNF	DNF	41	28	—	74	22	21	—	60	8	23	26	41	
Classic	2010	2011	2012	2013	2014	2015	2016	2017	2018	2019	2020	2021	2022	2023	2024
Strade Bianche	DNF	—	—	—	21	—	7	—	44	—	16	—	23	14	—
Milano–Torino	Not held		2	1	—	—	5	—	—	—	—	7	46	—	4
Amstel Gold Race	—	DNF	DNF	25	34	49	7	27	50	22	NH	—	—	—	—
La Flèche Wallonne	—	DNF	9	13	17	50	8	10	14	3	—	DNS	29	71	DNF
Grand Prix Cycliste de Québec	70	—	6	—	—	5	7	11	11	4	Not held		9	18	
Grand Prix Cycliste de Montréal	58	—	67	—	—	DNF	3	1	7	2	Not held		17	DNF	

Legend
—	Did not compete
DNF	Did not finish
DNS	Did not start
NH	Not held

== See also ==
- List of doping cases in cycling
