= Babylonian =

Babylonian may refer to:

- Babylon, a Semitic Akkadian city/state of ancient Mesopotamia founded in 1894 BC
- Babylonia, an ancient Akkadian-speaking Semitic nation-state and cultural region based in central-southern Mesopotamia (present-day Iraq)
- Babylonian language, a dialect of the Akkadian language

== See also ==
- Babylonia (disambiguation)
- Babylonian astronomy
- Babylonian calendar
- Babylonian captivity or Babylonian exile, a period in Jewish history
- Babylonian Jews, Jews of the area of modern-day Iraq and north Syria
- Babylonian literature
- Babylonian mathematics, also known as Assyro-Babylonian mathematics
- Babylonian religion
- First Babylonian dynasty, the first dynasty of Babylonia
- Neo-Babylonian Empire (626–539 BC)
