= Babilonia (disambiguation) =

Babilonia may refer to:

- Babilonia, a 1987 Argentine drama film directed by Jorge Salvador
- "Babilonia" (song), a 2014 song by Diodato
- Brian Babilonia (born 1994), Puerto Rican cyclist
- Gido Babilonia (1966–2007), Filipino basketball player
- Tai Babilonia, American figure skater

== See also ==
- Babilônia (disambiguation)
- Babylonia (disambiguation)
