= 2013 Milano–Torino =

94th edition of the Milano–Torino single-day cycling race

Milano–Torino
2013 UCI Europe Tour

Race details
- Dates: October 2
- Stages: 1
- Distance: 193.5 km (120.2 mi)
- Winning time: 4 hr 21 min 02 sec

Results
	Winner	Diego Ulissi (Italy)	(Lampre–Merida)
	Second	Rafał Majka (Poland)	(Saxo–Tinkoff)
	Third	Daniel Moreno (Spain)	(Team Katusha)

The 2013 Milano–Torino was the 94th edition of the Milano–Torino single-day cycling race. It was held on 2 October 2013, over a distance of 193 km, starting near Milan in Settimo Milanese and ending near Turin on the Colle di Superga ("Superga Hill").

Diego Ulissi of Lampre-Merida, who was second in the 2012 edition, won the race, Team Saxo-Tinkoff's Rafał Majka was second and Daniel Moreno (Team Katusha) completed the podium. The Italian rider attacked on the final climb together with Alberto Contador (2012 winner), Alejandro Valverde, Rafał Majka, Domenico Pozzovivo and Daniel Moreno, waiting the last 250 m to sprint to victory.

== Teams ==
A total of 21 teams and more than 150 riders were invited to the race. Among the riders, there favourites were Alberto Contador, Alejandro Valverde, Joaquim Rodríguez, Jan Bakelants, Carlos Betancur and Diego Ulissi

UCI ProTeams
- Saxo–Tinkoff
- Astana
- Lampre–Merida
- Garmin–Sharp
- Movistar Team
- RadioShack–Leopard
- Ag2r–La Mondiale
- Team Katusha
- Vacansoleil–DCM
- Argos–Shimano
UCI Professional Continental Teams
- Vini Fantini–Selle Italia
- Androni Giocattoli–Venezuela
- Bardiani Valvole–CSF Inox
- Colombia
- NetApp–Endura
- CCC–Polsat–Polkowice
- MTN–Qhubeka
- IAM Cycling
- Team Europcar
- RusVelo
UCI Continental Teams
- Ceramica Flaminia–Fondriest

== Results ==
	Cyclist	Team	Time
1	Diego Ulissi (ITA)	Lampre–Merida	4h 21' 02"
2	Rafał Majka (POL)	Saxo–Tinkoff	+ 3"
3	Daniel Moreno (ESP)	Team Katusha	+ 5"
4	Domenico Pozzovivo (ITA)	Ag2r–La Mondiale	+ 7"
5	Alberto Contador (ESP)	Saxo–Tinkoff	+ 11"
6	Alejandro Valverde (ESP)	Movistar Team	+ 15"
7	Mauro Finetto (ITA)	Vini Fantini–Selle Italia	+ 15"
8	Thomas Voeckler (FRA)	Team Europcar	+ 15"
9	Matteo Rabottini (ITA)	Vini Fantini–Selle Italia	+ 15"
10	Franco Pellizotti (ITA)	Androni Giocattoli–Venezuela	+ 15"
