= Babylonia (disambiguation) =

Babylonia was a region in Mesopotamia, and a kingdom up to 539 BC.

Babylonia may also refer to:

- The region called Babylonia by Talmudic scholars between c. 589-1038 CE; see Talmudic Academies in Babylonia
- Babylonia (gastropod), a genus of sea snails
- "Babylónia", a 1990 rock-pop song by Marika Gombitová
- Fate/Grand Order - Absolute Demonic Front: Babylonia, a 2019 anime set in Babylonia
- Babylonia (exoplanet), an extrasolar planet in the Uruk exoplanetary system

== See also ==
- Babilonia (disambiguation)
- Babilônia (disambiguation)
- Babilon (disambiguation)
- Babylon, the capital city of Babylonia in ancient Mesopotamia
- Babylon (disambiguation)
