= Franco Pellizotti =

Italian cyclist

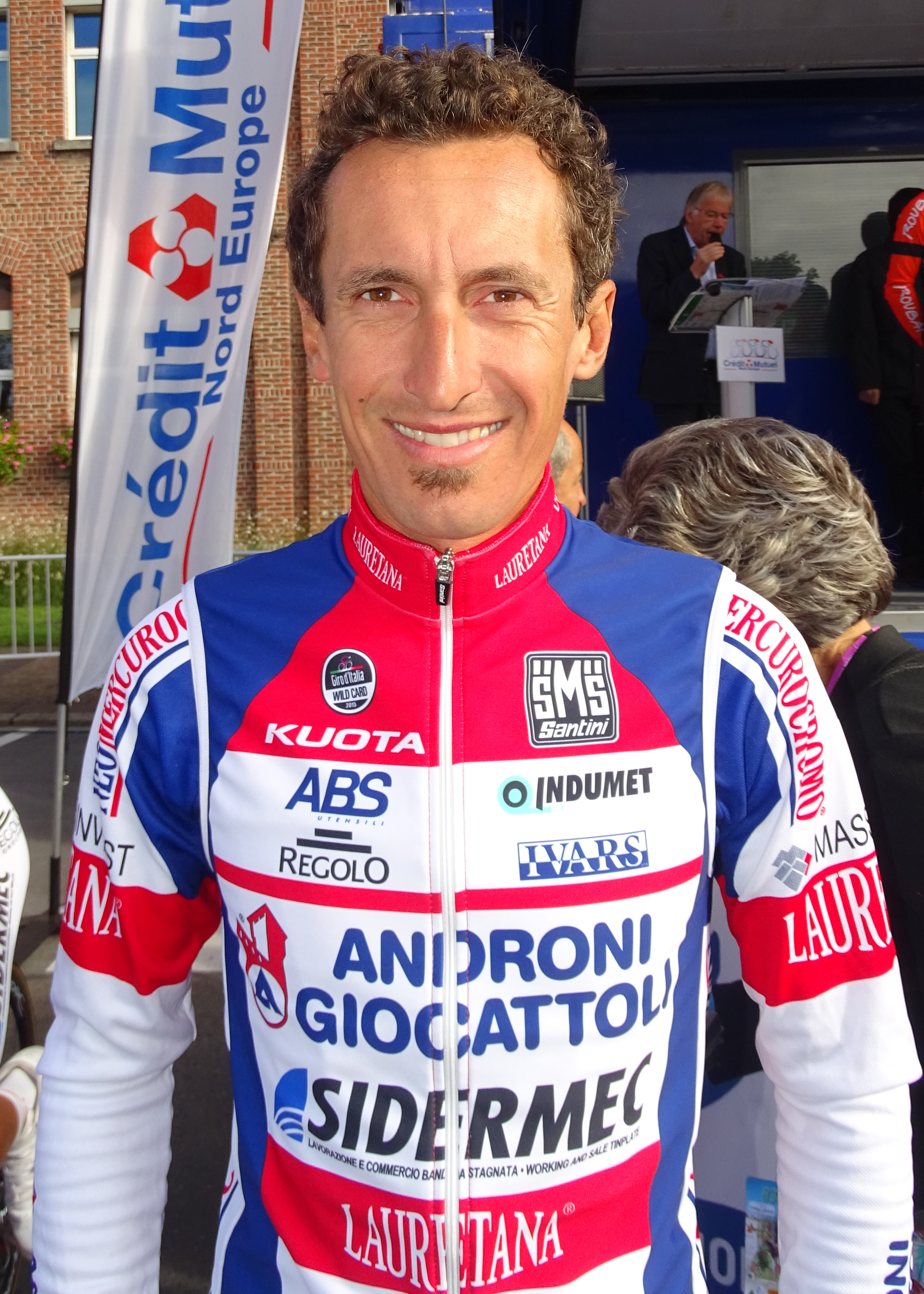
- Pellizotti in 2015

Personal information
- Full name: Franco Pellizotti
- Nicknames: Pello, Delfino di Bibione
- Born: 15 January 1978 (age 48) Latisana, Italy
- Height: 1.75 m (5 ft 9 in)
- Weight: 64 kg (141 lb; 10 st 1 lb)

Cycling career
- Sport: Cycling
- Current team: Team Bahrain Victorious
- Discipline: Road
- Role: Rider (retired); Directeur sportif
- Rider type: Climber

Professional teams
- 2001–2004: Alessio
- 2005–2010: Liquigas–Bianchi
- 2012–2016: Androni Giocattoli–Venezuela
- 2017–2018: Bahrain–Merida

Managerial team
- 2019–: Bahrain–Merida (directeur sportif)

Major wins
- Grand Tours Giro d'Italia 2 individual stages (2006, 2008) One-day races and Classics National Road Race Championships (2012)

Franco Pellizotti (born 15 January 1978) is an Italian former professional road bicycle racer, who rode professionally between 2001 and 2018 for the Alessio, Liquigas–Doimo, Androni Giocattoli–Sidermec and Bahrain–Merida teams. Pellizotti now works as a directeur sportif for the Team Bahrain Victorious team.

== Career ==
=== Early career ===
Pellizotti was born in Latisana, Udine, Friuli-Venezia Giulia. During his career, Pellizotti was known as a climbing specialist and won Stage 10 in the 2006 Giro d'Italia, Stage 16 in the 2008 Giro d'Italia and Stage 17 in the 2009 Giro d'Italia.

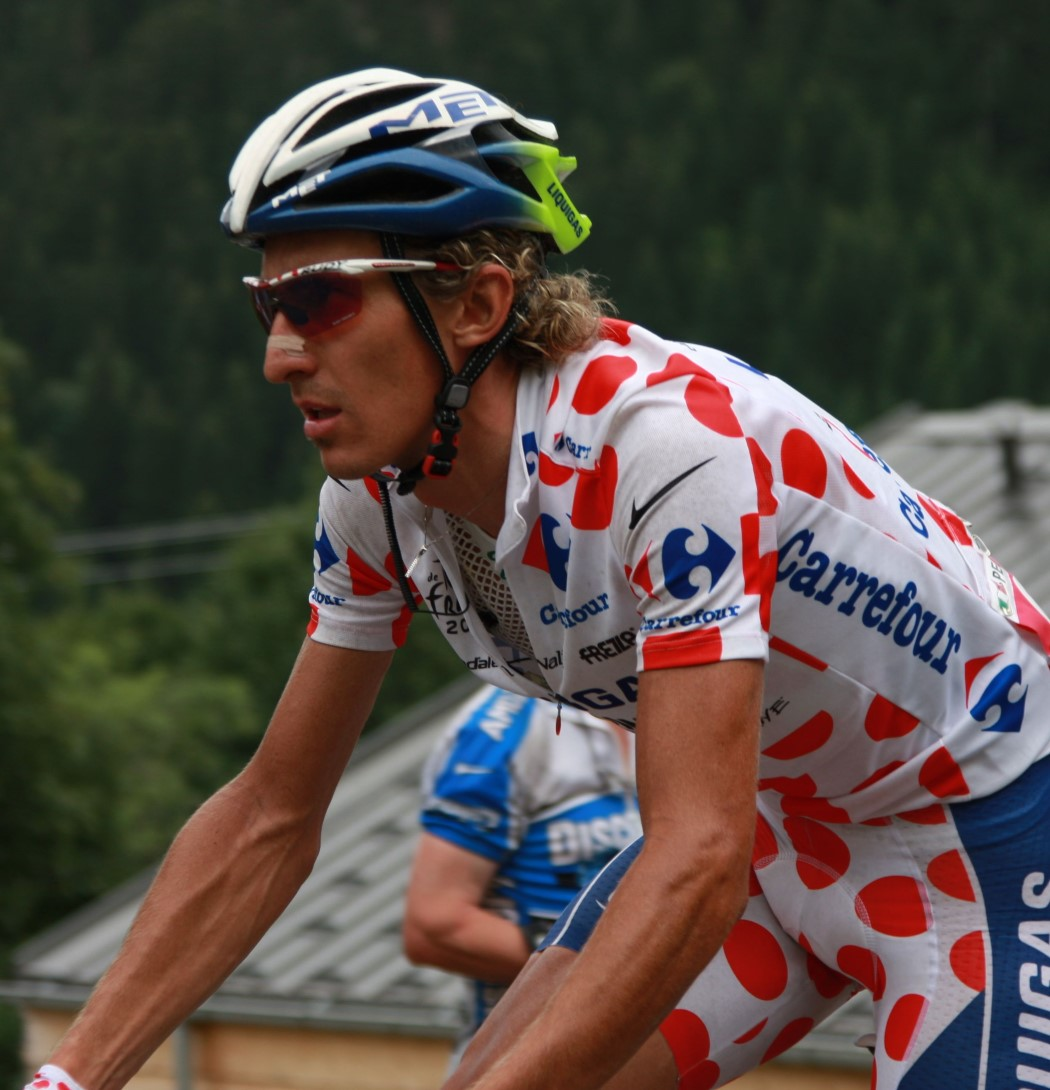
Pellizotti at the 2009 Tour de France

After finishing third overall in the 2009 Giro, he won the polka dot jersey in Paris as the best climber of the 2009 Tour de France (which has been cancelled), as well as named the Most Combative (Aggressive) Rider on Stages 9 and 17. At the start of each race, Pellizotti was seen making the sign of the cross and kissing a crucifix around his neck.

=== Doping ban ===
On 3 May 2010, Pellizotti's name was released by La Gazzetta dello Sport as being one of several riders under investigation by the Union Cycliste Internationale (UCI) for "irregular blood values". Pellizotti was reported to have had "suspicious values" on the eve of the 2009 Tour de France and request has been made by the UCI for investigation. This was confirmed later that day in a UCI press release. He was due to be one of Liquigas–Doimo' team leaders at the 2010 Giro d'Italia, but was immediately pulled from the squad and replaced with Vincenzo Nibali. His team said they have faith in the explanation put forward by Pellizotti and are conducting a further investigation. Shortly after the end of the season, the suspension was lifted on the grounds of lack of evidence, and Pellizotti declared a wish to seek financial redress from the UCI. Liquigas–Doimo declined to re-sign Pellizotti after the 2010 season. Pellizotti's case reached the Court of Arbitration for Sport in March 2011. After asking the court for a speedy verdict, he was suspended for two years after it upheld the UCI's appeal. His ban lasted until May 2012. The Court also annulled all results from 17 May 2009, meaning that Pellizotti lost a stage win and third place overall in the Giro d'Italia and a stage win and overall victory in the mountains and combativity classifications in the Tour de France.

=== Return ===
Following the conclusion of his ban, Pellizotti signed with the Androni Giocattoli–Venezuela team.

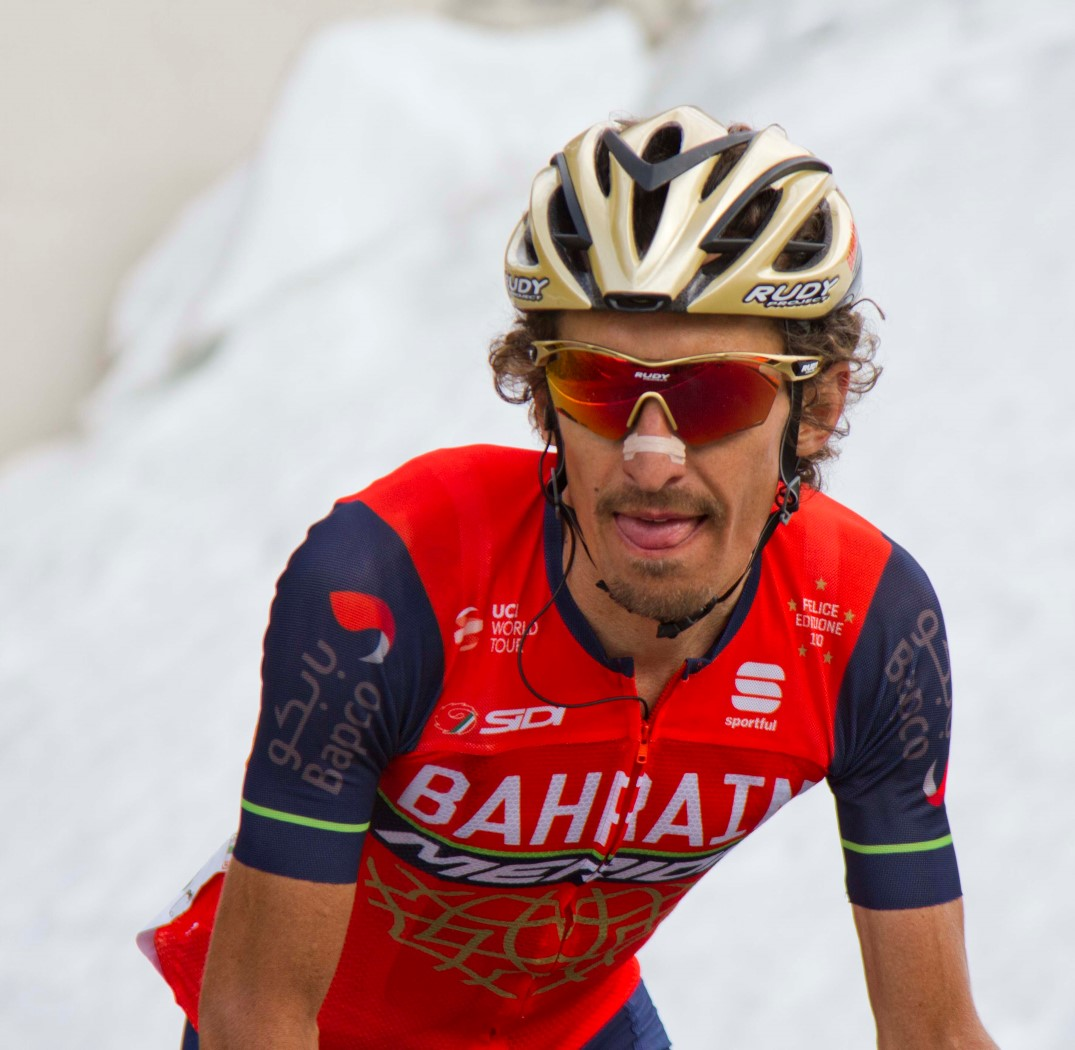
Pellizotti at the 2017 Giro d'Italia

In August 2013, it was announced that after two years with Androni Giocattoli–Venezuela, Pellizotti was to join Astana for the 2014 season. However, Pellizotti would have only been able to compete from May 2014 due to Astana being a member of the Mouvement pour un cyclisme crédible (MPCC), and that Pellizotti had previously served a two-year ban for a UCI biological passport violation. Further talks between Pellizotti and Astana resulted in his contract with the squad being nullified, and Pellizotti was able to return to Androni Giocattoli–Venezuela for a third season, in 2014.

== Major results ==
2000
1st Coppa Città di Asti
2nd Overall Giro Ciclistico d'Italia

1st Stage 6

2nd Gran Premio Palio del Recioto
2nd Trofeo Alcide Degasperi
3rd Trofeo Zsšdi
5th Overall Grand Prix Guillaume Tell
2001
1st Points classification Tour of Austria
8th Giro di Campania
10th Overall Deutschland Tour
10th Giro dell'Appennino
2002
1st Giro del Friuli
1st Stage 4 Tour of the Basque Country
1st Stage 5 Tour de Pologne
5th Trofeo Melinda
6th Giro dell'Emilia
9th Overall Tirreno–Adriatico

1st Stage 6

2003
3rd Overall Settimana Internazionale di Coppi e Bartali
6th Trofeo Melinda
8th Overall Giro d'Italia
2004
1st Gran Premio di Chiasso
2nd Giro del Friuli
2nd Coppa Sabatini
3rd Overall Tour de Pologne
5th Giro del Veneto
6th Giro dell'Emilia
7th Overall Settimana Internazionale di Coppi e Bartali
9th Giro di Lombardia
2005
1st Overall Settimana Internazionale di Coppi e Bartali

1st Stage 2

2nd Trofeo Laigueglia
2nd Gran Premio Città di Camaiore
3rd Overall Tour Méditerranéen
4th Overall Volta a la Comunitat Valenciana
6th Overall Paris–Nice
8th Giro del Veneto
9th Milan–San Remo
2006
2nd Milano–Torino
3rd GP Industria & Artigianato di Larciano
3rd Coppa Ugo Agostoni
5th Gran Premio Nobili Rubinetterie
7th Trofeo Sóller
8th Overall Giro d'Italia

1st Stage 10

10th Clásica de San Sebastián
2007
1st Memorial Marco Pantani
2nd GP Industria & Artigianato di Larciano
5th Overall Paris–Nice

1st Points classification
1st Stage 3

5th Overall Giro del Trentino
6th Giro di Toscana
9th Overall Tour of California
9th Overall Giro d'Italia

1st Stage 1 (TTT)

2008
2nd Overall Tour of Slovenia
3rd Overall Tour de Pologne
3rd Giro d'Oro
4th Overall Giro d'Italia

1st Stage 16 (ITT)

5th Clásica de San Sebastián
2009
7th GP Industria & Artigianato di Larciano

Voided results from 9 May 2009 to April 2012.

2009
~~Tour de France~~

~~1st Mountains classification~~
~~Combativity award Overall~~

~~3rd Overall Giro d'Italia~~

~~1st Stage 17~~

2010
~~3rd GP Industria & Artigianato di Larciano~~

2012
1st Road race, National Road Championships
3rd Overall Giro di Padania
3rd Gran Premio Città di Camaiore
3rd Giro dell'Emilia
4th Overall Vuelta a Burgos
5th Trofeo Melinda
5th Circuito de Getxo
9th Gran Premio Nobili Rubinetterie
10th Milano–Torino
2013
2nd Overall Route du Sud
4th Overall Settimana Ciclistica Lombarda
4th Coppa Sabatini
4th Giro dell'Emilia
5th Gran Premio Industria e Commercio di Prato
6th GP Industria & Artigianato di Larciano
6th Tre Valli Varesine
8th Giro di Lombardia
8th Coppa Ugo Agostoni
10th Milano–Torino
2014
3rd Coppa Sabatini
3rd Giro dell'Emilia
6th Overall Settimana Internazionale di Coppi e Bartali
9th Overall Giro del Trentino
10th Trofeo Laigueglia
2015
4th Giro dell'Appennino
6th Gran Premio di Lugano
7th Overall Settimana Internazionale di Coppi e Bartali
7th Giro dell'Emilia
9th Overall Herald Sun Tour
2016
7th Coppa Sabatini
10th Overall Tour of Slovenia
2018
6th Memorial Marco Pantani

=== Grand Tour general classification results timeline ===
Grand Tour	2001	2002	2003	2004	2005	2006	2007	2008	2009	2010	2011	2012	2013	2014	2015	2016	2017	2018
Giro d'Italia	—	16	8	11	—	8	9	4	~~3~~	—	—	—	11	12	24	—	21	—
Tour de France	—	—	75	—	47	—	—	—	~~37~~	—	—	—	—	—	—	—	—	60
Vuelta a España	20	—	—	—	—	—	37	—	—	—	—	—	—	—	—	—	25	50

Legend
—	Did not compete
DNF	Did not finish
~~No.~~	Results expunged
