= Cycling at the 2016 Summer Olympics – Men's individual road race =

Men's cycling road race at the Games of the XXXI Olympiad
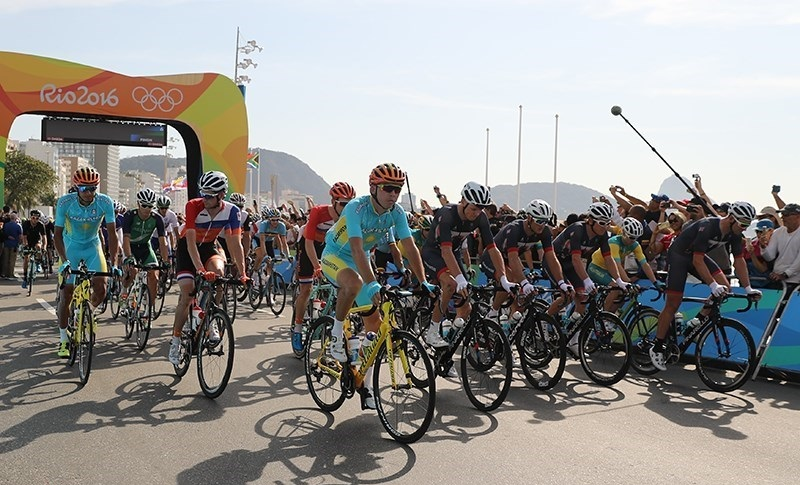
- View of the start of the Men's road race.
- Venue: Fort Copacabana; 241.5 km (150.1 mi)
- Date: 6 August 2016
- Competitors: 144 from 63 nations
- Winning time: 6:10:05

Medalists
1st place, gold medalist(s)		Greg Van Avermaet; Belgium
2nd place, silver medalist(s)		Jakob Fuglsang; Denmark
3rd place, bronze medalist(s)		Rafał Majka; Poland

The men's road race was one of 18 cycling events of the 2016 Olympic Games in Rio de Janeiro. The race started and finished on 6 August at Fort Copacabana and was won by Greg Van Avermaet of Belgium. It was Belgium's first victory in the men's individual road race since 1952 and second overall, tying France and the Soviet Union for second-most behind Italy (five). Belgium matched Italy for most total medals, at seven. Jakob Fuglsang won Denmark's fourth silver medal in the event; the nation had yet to win gold. Rafał Majka's bronze was Poland's first medal in the event since 1980.

== Qualification ==
Nations could earn qualification spots primarily through UCI tours. The top five nations at the UCI World Tour earned five quota places, with nations further down the rankings earning progressively fewer quota places. There were also up to three places per nation available through continental tours and championships. Individuals could also earn places if their nation's ranking was insufficient. A few places were reserved for the host nation and Tripartite Commission invitations.

== Background ==
This was the 20th appearance of the event, previously held in 1896 and then at every Summer Olympics since 1936. It replaced the individual time trial event that had been held from 1912 to 1932; the time trial had been re-introduced in 1996 alongside the road race. Azerbaijan, the Dominican Republic, Kosovo, and Laos each made their debut in the men's individual road race. Great Britain made its 20th appearance in the event, the only nation to have competed in each appearance to date.

=== Pre-race favourites ===
Due to the grueling nature of the course, the riders expected to finish with a medal were all known for their climbing and descending skills. Favorites heading into the race were Alejandro Valverde, Vincenzo Nibali, Chris Froome, Joaquim Rodríguez and Julian Alaphilippe. If Froome had won gold, he would have become the first person to ever win Tour de France and the cycling road race in the same season.

== Course ==
The men's course was 241.5 km (150.1 mi) long. Starting at Fort Copacabana, the peloton headed west to pass through Ipanema, Barra, and Reserva Maripendi Beaches via the coastal road leading to the 24.8 km (15.4 mi) Pontal / Grumari circuit loop. After four laps of the Grumari sector (99.2 km of 241.5 km), the course returned east via the same coastal road to enter the 25.7 km (16.0 mi) Vista Chinesa Circuit loop at Gávea for three laps (77.1 km (47.9 mi) of 241.5 km (150.1 mi)) before finishing back at Fort Copacabana. As with all road races in the Olympic Games, the athletes are escorted by law enforcement to keep traffic and bystanders out of harm's way. For the 2016 Olympics, escort for the riders is done by the Brazilian Federal Highway Police (PRF).

== 2016 Olympic cycling road course maps ==
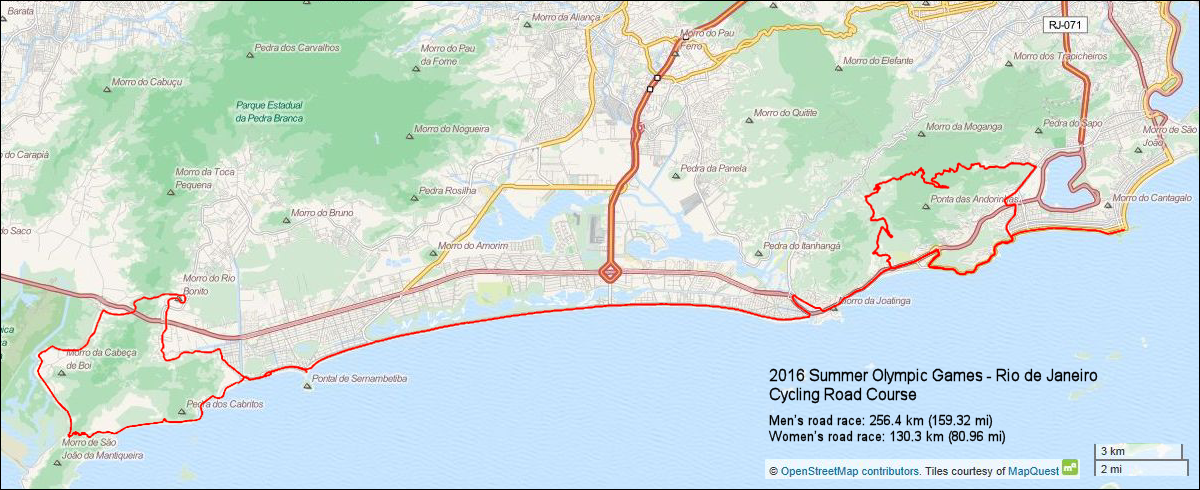
2016 Olympic Cycling Men's Road Course: 241.5 km

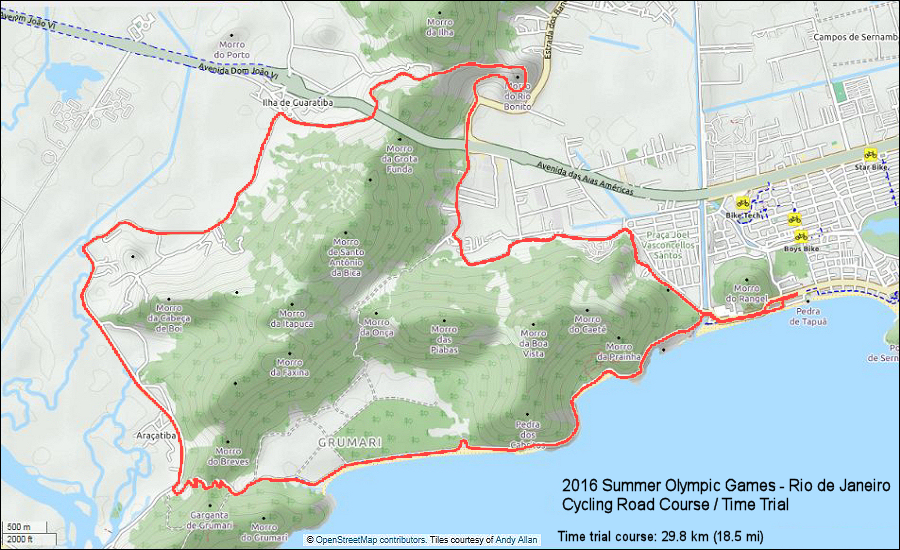
2016 Olympic Cycling Grumari Circuit: 24.8 km

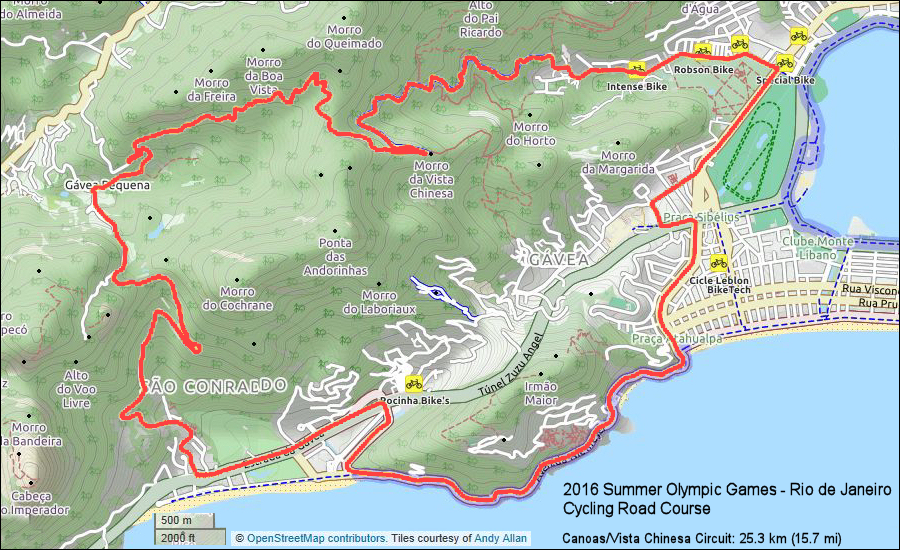
2016 Olympic Cycling Vista Chinesa Circuit: 25.7 km

== Schedule ==
All times are Brasília Time (UTC−3).

Date	Time	Round
Saturday, 6 August 2016	9:30	Final

== Start list ==
The following NOCs had qualified riders to compete in the road race event. The following riders were confirmed by their respective NOCs.

NOC	Number	Athletes	Ref
Algeria	2	Abderrahmane Mansouri; Youcef Reguigui	
Argentina	3	Daniel Díaz; Maximiliano Richeze; Eduardo Sepúlveda	
Australia	4	Rohan Dennis; Simon Clarke; Richie Porte; Scott Bowden	
Austria	2	Stefan Denifl; Georg Preidler	
Azerbaijan	1	Maksym Averin	
Belarus	2	Vasil Kiryienka; Kanstantsin Sivtsov	
Belgium	5	Philippe Gilbert; Serge Pauwels; Greg van Avermaet; Tim Wellens; Laurens De Plus	
Bolivia	1	Óscar Soliz	
Brazil	2	Murilo Fischer; Kléber Ramos	
Bulgaria	1	Stefan Hristov	
Canada	3	Antoine Duchesne; Hugo Houle; Michael Woods	
Chile	1	José Luis Rodríguez	
Colombia	5	Esteban Chaves; Sergio Henao; Miguel Ángel López; Jarlinson Pantano; Rigoberto Urán	
Costa Rica	1	Andrey Amador	
Croatia	2	Kristijan Đurasek; Matija Kvasina	
Czech Republic	4	Jan Bárta; Leopold König; Zdeněk Štybar; Petr Vakoč	
Denmark	3	Jakob Fuglsang; Christopher Juul-Jensen; Chris Anker Sørensen	
Dominican Republic	1	Diego Milán	
Ecuador	1	Byron Guamá	
Eritrea	1	Daniel Teklehaimanot	
Estonia	2	Tanel Kangert; Rein Taaramäe	
Ethiopia	1	Tsgabu Grmay	
France	4	Julian Alaphilippe; Romain Bardet; Warren Barguil; Alexis Vuillermoz	
Germany	4	Emanuel Buchmann; Simon Geschke; Maximilian Levy; Tony Martin	
Great Britain	5	Chris Froome; Steve Cummings; Ian Stannard; Geraint Thomas; Adam Yates	
Greece	1	Ioannis Tamouridis	
Guatemala	1	Manuel Rodas	
Hong Kong	1	Cheung King Lok	
Iran	3	Ghader Mizbani; Arvin Moazemi; Samad Pourseyedi	
Ireland	2	Dan Martin; Nicolas Roche	
Italy	5	Fabio Aru; Vincenzo Nibali; Damiano Caruso; Alessandro De Marchi; Diego Rosa	

NOC	Number	Athletes	Ref
Japan	2	Yukiya Arashiro; Kohei Uchima	
Kazakhstan	2	Bakhtiyar Kozhatayev; Andrey Zeits	
Kosovo	1	Qëndrim Guri	
Laos	1	Ariya Phounsavath	
Latvia	2	Toms Skujiņš; Aleksejs Saramotins	
Lithuania	2	Ramūnas Navardauskas; Ignatas Konovalovas	
Luxembourg	1	Fränk Schleck	
Morocco	3	Anass Aït El Abdia; Soufiane Haddi; Mouhssine Lahsaini	
Mexico	1	Luis Lemus	
Namibia	1	Dan Craven	
Netherlands	4	Tom Dumoulin; Steven Kruijswijk; Bauke Mollema; Wout Poels	
New Zealand	2	George Bennett; Zac Williams	
Norway	4	Edvald Boasson Hagen; Sven Erik Bystrøm; Vegard Stake Laengen; Lars Petter Nordhaug	
Poland	4	Maciej Bodnar; Michał Gołaś; Michał Kwiatkowski; Rafał Majka	
Portugal	4	André Cardoso; Rui Costa; José Mendes; Nelson Oliveira	
Puerto Rico	1	Brian Babilonia	
Romania	1	Serghei Țvetcov	
Russia	3	Sergey Chernetskiy; Alexey Kurbatov; Pavel Kochetkov	
Rwanda	1	Adrien Niyonshuti	
Serbia	1	Ivan Stević	
Slovakia	1	Patrik Tybor	
Slovenia	4	Matej Mohorič; Jan Polanc; Primož Roglič; Simon Špilak	
South Africa	2	Daryl Impey; Louis Meintjes	
South Korea	2	Kim Ok-cheol; Seo Joon-yong	
Spain	5	Jonathan Castroviejo; Imanol Erviti; Ion Izagirre; Joaquim Rodríguez; Alejandro Valverde	
Switzerland	4	Michael Albasini; Fabian Cancellara; Steve Morabito; Sébastien Reichenbach	
Tunisia	1	Ali Nouisri	
Turkey	2	Ahmet Örken; Onur Balkan	
Ukraine	3	Andriy Hrivko; Denys Kostyuk; Andriy Khripta	
United Arab Emirates	1	Yousif Mirza	
United States	2	Brent Bookwalter; Taylor Phinney	
Venezuela	2	Miguel Ubeto; Jonathan Monsalve	

== Results ==
In the table below, "s.t." indicates that the rider crossed the finish line in the same group as the cyclist before him, and was therefore credited with the same finishing time.

Rank	Cyclist	Nation	Time
1st place, gold medalist(s)	Greg Van Avermaet	Belgium	6h 10' 05"
2nd place, silver medalist(s)	Jakob Fuglsang	Denmark	s.t.
3rd place, bronze medalist(s)	Rafał Majka	Poland	+ 5"
4	Julian Alaphilippe	France	+ 22"
5	Joaquim Rodríguez	Spain	s.t.
6	Fabio Aru	Italy	s.t.
7	Louis Meintjes	South Africa	s.t.
8	Andrey Zeits	Kazakhstan	+ 25"
9	Tanel Kangert	Estonia	+ 1' 47"
10	Rui Costa	Portugal	+ 2' 29"
11	Geraint Thomas	Great Britain	s.t.
12	Chris Froome	Great Britain	+ 2' 58"
13	Dan Martin	Ireland	s.t.
14	Emanuel Buchmann	Germany	s.t.
15	Adam Yates	Great Britain	+ 3' 03"
16	Brent Bookwalter	United States	+ 3' 31"
17	Bauke Mollema	Netherlands	s.t.
18	Kristijan Đurasek	Croatia	s.t.
19	Sébastien Reichenbach	Switzerland	s.t.
20	Fränk Schleck	Luxembourg	s.t.
21	Esteban Chaves	Colombia	+ 3' 34"
22	Serge Pauwels	Belgium	+ 6' 12"
23	Alexis Vuillermoz	France	s.t.
24	Romain Bardet	France	s.t.
25	Simon Clarke	Australia	s.t.
26	Primož Roglič	Slovenia	+ 9' 38"
27	Yukiya Arashiro	Japan	s.t.
28	Daryl Impey	South Africa	s.t.
29	Nicolas Roche	Ireland	s.t.
30	Alejandro Valverde	Spain	s.t.
31	Sergey Chernetskiy	Russia	s.t.
32	Christopher Juul-Jensen	Denmark	s.t.
33	George Bennett	New Zealand	+ 11' 49"
34	Fabian Cancellara	Switzerland	s.t.
35	Ramūnas Navardauskas	Lithuania	+ 12' 18"
36	André Cardoso	Portugal	s.t.
37	Eduardo Sepúlveda	Argentina	s.t.
38	Pavel Kochetkov	Russia	s.t.
39	Steven Kruijswijk	Netherlands	s.t.
40	Damiano Caruso	Italy	s.t.
41	Andriy Hrivko	Ukraine	+ 13' 18"
42	Philippe Gilbert	Belgium	s.t.
43	Daniel Teklehaimanot	Eritrea	+ 19' 20"
44	Georg Preidler	Austria	+ 19' 37"
45	Patrik Tybor	Slovakia	+ 20' 00"
46	Aleksejs Saramotins	Latvia	s.t.
47	Anass Aït El Abdia	Morocco	s.t.
48	Lars Petter Nordhaug	Norway	s.t.
49	Kanstantsin Sivtsov	Belarus	s.t.
50	Vegard Stake Laengen	Norway	s.t.
51	Ioannis Tamouridis	Greece	s.t.
52	Jan Polanc	Slovenia	s.t.
53	José Mendes	Portugal	s.t.
54	Andrey Amador	Costa Rica	s.t.
55	Michael Woods	Canada	s.t.
56	Michał Gołaś	Poland	s.t.
57	Simon Špilak	Slovenia	s.t.
58	Petr Vakoč	Czech Republic	s.t.
59	Toms Skujiņš	Latvia	s.t.
60	Chris Anker Sørensen	Denmark	s.t.
61	Bakhtiyar Kozhatayev	Kazakhstan	s.t.
62	Michał Kwiatkowski	Poland	s.t.
63	Alessandro De Marchi	Italy	+ 20' 05"
—	Murilo Fischer	Brazil	+ 31' 47"
—	Ignatas Konovalovas	Lithuania	s.t.
—	Jonathan Castroviejo	Spain	DNF
—	Imanol Erviti	Spain	DNF
—	Ion Izagirre	Spain	DNF
—	Sergio Henao	Colombia	DNF
—	Miguel Ángel López	Colombia	DNF
—	Jarlinson Pantano	Colombia	DNF
—	Rigoberto Urán	Colombia	DNF
—	Warren Barguil	France	DNF
—	Steve Cummings	Great Britain	DNF
—	Ian Stannard	Great Britain	DNF
—	Rohan Dennis	Australia	DNF
—	Scott Bowden	Australia	DNF
—	Richie Porte	Australia	DNF
—	Laurens De Plus	Belgium	DNF
—	Tim Wellens	Belgium	DNF
—	Tom Dumoulin	Netherlands	DNF
—	Wout Poels	Netherlands	DNF
—	Vincenzo Nibali	Italy	DNF
—	Diego Rosa	Italy	DNF
—	Michael Albasini	Switzerland	DNF
—	Steve Morabito	Switzerland	DNF
—	Simon Geschke	Germany	DNF
—	Maximilian Levy	Germany	DNF
—	Tony Martin	Germany	DNF
—	Edvald Boasson Hagen	Norway	DNF
—	Sven Erik Bystrøm	Norway	DNF
—	Maciej Bodnar	Poland	DNF
—	Jan Bárta	Czech Republic	DNF
—	Leopold König	Czech Republic	DNF
—	Zdeněk Štybar	Czech Republic	DNF
—	Denys Kostyuk	Ukraine	DNF
—	Andriy Khripta	Ukraine	DNF
—	Matej Mohorič	Slovenia	DNF
—	Ghader Mizbani	Iran	DNF
—	Arvin Moazzami	Iran	DNF
—	Samad Pourseyedi	Iran	DNF
—	Nelson Oliveira	Portugal	DNF
—	Abderrahmane Mansouri	Algeria	DNF
—	Youcef Reguigui	Algeria	DNF
—	Stefan Denifl	Austria	DNF
—	Soufiane Haddi	Morocco	DNF
—	Mouhssine Lahsaini	Morocco	DNF
—	Taylor Phinney	United States	DNF
—	Rein Taaramäe	Estonia	DNF
—	Zac Williams	New Zealand	DNF
—	Antoine Duchesne	Canada	DNF
—	Hugo Houle	Canada	DNF
—	Vasil Kiryienka	Belarus	DNF
—	Kohei Uchima	Japan	DNF
—	Kim Ok-cheol	South Korea	DNF
—	Seo Joon-yong	South Korea	DNF
—	Jonathan Monsalve	Venezuela	DNF
—	Miguel Ubeto	Venezuela	DNF
—	Matija Kvasina	Croatia	DNF
—	Daniel Díaz	Argentina	DNF
—	Maximiliano Richeze	Argentina	DNF
—	Cheung King Lok	Hong Kong	DNF
—	José Luis Rodríguez Aguilar	Chile	DNF
—	Adrien Niyonshuti	Rwanda	DNF
—	Maksym Averin	Azerbaijan	DNF
—	Serghei Țvetcov	Romania	DNF
—	Luis Lemus	Mexico	DNF
—	Onur Balkan	Turkey	DNF
—	Ahmet Örken	Turkey	DNF
—	Kléber Ramos	Brazil	DNF
—	Ali Nouisri	Tunisia	DNF
—	Stefan Hristov	Bulgaria	DNF
—	Manuel Rodas	Guatemala	DNF
—	Byron Guamá	Ecuador	DNF
—	Ivan Stević	Serbia	DNF
—	Tsgabu Grmay	Ethiopia	DNF
—	Diego Milán	Dominican Republic	DNF
—	Dan Craven	Namibia	DNF
—	Óscar Soliz	Bolivia	DNF
—	Qëndrim Guri	Kosovo	DNF
—	Brian Babilonia	Puerto Rico	DNF
—	Yousif Mirza	United Arab Emirates	DNF
—	Ariya Phounsavath	Laos	DNF
—	Alexey Kurbatov	Russia	DNF
