= 2016 Tour of Slovenia =

2016 UCI Europe Tour (2.1 race)

Race details
- Dates: 16–19 June
- Stages: 4
- Distance: 588.8 km (365.9 mi)
- Winning time: 15hr 10' 29"

Results
Jersey awarded to the overall winner	Winner	(Estonia) Rein Taaramäe	(Team Katusha)
	Second	(Australia) Jack Haig	(Orica–GreenEDGE)
	Third	(Czech Republic) Jan Bárta	(Bora–Argon 18)
Jersey awarded to the points classification winner	Points	(Australia) Jack Haig	(Orica–GreenEDGE)
Jersey awarded to the mountains classification winner	Mountains	(Slovenia) Jan Tratnik	(Amplatz–BMC)
Jersey awarded to the young rider classification winner	Young rider	(Colombia) Egan Bernal	(Androni Giocattoli–Sidermec)
	Team	(Italy) Androni Giocattoli–Sidermec	

The 2016 Tour of Slovenia (Slovene: Dirka po Sloveniji) was the 23rd edition of the Tour of Slovenia, categorized as 2.1 stage race (UCI Europe Tour) held between 16 and 19 June 2016.

The race consisted of 4 stages with 588.8 km (365.9 mi) in total.

== Teams ==
Total 140 riders (124 finished it) from 19 teams started the race.

UCI WorldTeams (18/6)

- Team Sky
- Tinkoff
- Lampre–Merida
- Team Dimension Data
- Team Katusha
- Orica–GreenEDGE

UCI Professional Continental teams

- Bora–Argon 18
- Bardiani–CSF
- Androni Giocattoli–Sidermec
- Topsport Vlaanderen–Baloise
- Gazprom–RusVelo
- Nippo–Vini Fantini

UCI Continental teams

- Adria Mobil
- Amplatz–BMC
- Norda–MG.K Vis Vega
- Radenska–Ljubljana
- SKC TUFO Prostějov
- Meridiana–Kamen

National team

- Slovenia

== Route and stages ==
Stage characteristics and winners
Stage	Date	Course	Distance	Type	Winner
1	16 June	Ljubljana – Koper	175.7 km (109 mi)	Intermediate stage	(Belgium) Jens Keukeleire
2	17 June	Nova Gorica – Golte	217.2 km (135 mi)	Mountain stage	(Estonia) Rein Taaramäe
3	18 June	Celje – Celjska koča	16.8 km (10 mi)	Individual time trial	(Italy) Diego Ulissi
4	19 June	Rogaška Slatina – Novo mesto	179.1 km (111 mi)	Intermediate stage	(Russia) Alexander Porsev
Total		588.8 km (365.9 mi)			

=== Stage 1 ===
16 June 2016 — Ljubljana to Koper, 175.7 km (109.2 mi)

Rank	Rider	Team	Time
Official results
1	(Belgium) Jens Keukeleire	Orica–GreenEDGE	4h 27' 33"
2	(Italy) Diego Ulissi	Lampre–Merida	s.t.
3	(United Kingdom) Scott Thwaites	Bora–Argon 18	s.t.
4	(Australia) Jack Haig	Orica–GreenEDGE	+ 3"
5	(Italy) Francesco Gavazzi	Androni Giocattoli–Sidermec	+ 3"
6	(Italy) Sacha Modolo	Lampre–Merida	+ 3"
7	(Spain) Omar Fraile	Team Dimension Data	+ 3"
8	(Italy) Enrico Barbin	Bardiani–CSF	+ 3"
9	(Italy) Kristian Sbaragli	Team Dimension Data	+ 3"
10	(Italy) Luca Chirico	Bardiani–CSF	+ 3"

=== Stage 2 ===
17 June 2016 — Nova Gorica to Golte, 217.2 km (135.0 mi)

Rank	Rider	Team	Time
Official results
1	(Estonia) Rein Taaramäe	Team Katusha	5h 46' 40"
2	(Australia) Jack Haig	Orica–GreenEDGE	+ 36"
3	(Colombia) Egan Bernal	Androni Giocattoli–Sidermec	+ 50"
4	(Russia) Pavel Kochetkov	Team Katusha	+ 58"
5	(Slovenia) Jure Golčer	Adria Mobil	+ 1' 01"
6	(Slovenia) Janez Brajkovič	Slovenia	+ 1' 03"
7	(Italy) Antonio Santoro	Meridiana–Kamen	+ 1' 08"
8	(Belgium) Floris De Tier	Topsport Vlaanderen–Baloise	+ 1' 14"
9	(Colombia) Rodolfo Torres	Androni Giocattoli–Sidermec	+ 1' 18"
10	(Portugal) José Mendes	Bora–Argon 18	+ 1' 20"
General classification after the stage
1	(Estonia) Rein Taaramäe	Team Katusha	10h 14' 16"
2	(Australia) Jack Haig	Orica–GreenEDGE	+ 36"
3	(Colombia) Egan Bernal	Androni Giocattoli–Sidermec	+ 50"
4	(Russia) Pavel Kochetkov	Team Katusha	+ 58"
5	(Slovenia) Jure Golčer	Adria Mobil	+ 1' 01"
6	(Italy) Antonio Santoro	Meridiana–Kamen	+ 1' 08"
7	(Belgium) Floris De Tier	Topsport Vlaanderen–Baloise	+ 1' 14"
8	(Italy) Michele Gazzara	Norda–MG.K Vis Vega	+ 1' 28"
9	(Czech Republic) Jan Bárta	Bora–Argon 18	+ 1' 28"
10	(Slovenia) Janez Brajkovič	Slovenia	+ 1' 30"

=== Stage 3 ===
18 June 2016 — Celje to Celjska Koča, 16.8 km (10.4 mi), individual time trial (ITT)

Rank	Rider	Team	Time
Official results
1	(Italy) Diego Ulissi	Lampre–Merida	28' 23"
2	(Estonia) Rein Taaramäe	Team Katusha	+ 4"
3	(Spain) Omar Fraile	Team Dimension Data	+ 52"
4	(Russia) Alexander Foliforov	Gazprom–RusVelo	+ 1' 10"
5	(Australia) Jack Haig	Orica–GreenEDGE	+ 1' 10"
6	(Czech Republic) Jan Bárta	Bora–Argon 18	+ 1' 14"
7	(Russia) Artem Ovechkin	Gazprom–RusVelo	+ 1' 22"
8	(Portugal) José Mendes	Bora–Argon 18	+ 1' 23"
9	(Italy) Gianni Moscon	Team Sky	+ 1' 24"
10	(Slovenia) Jan Tratnik	Amplatz–BMC	+ 1' 28"
General classification after the stage
1	(Estonia) Rein Taaramäe	Team Katusha	10h 42' 43"
2	(Australia) Jack Haig	Orica–GreenEDGE	+ 1' 42"
3	(Czech Republic) Jan Bárta	Bora–Argon 18	+ 2' 38"
4	(Colombia) Egan Bernal	Androni Giocattoli–Sidermec	+ 2' 47"
5	(Slovenia) Jure Golčer	Adria Mobil	+ 2' 48"
6	(Belgium) Eliot Lietaer	Topsport Vlaanderen–Baloise	+ 2' 57"
7	(Portugal) José Mendes	Bora–Argon 18	+ 3' 00"
8	(Russia) Pavel Kochetkov	Team Katusha	+ 3' 14"
9	(Italy) Gianni Moscon	Team Sky	+ 3' 15"
10	(Slovenia) Janez Brajkovič	Slovenia	+ 3' 15"

=== Stage 4 ===
19 June 2016 — Rogaška Slatina to Novo mesto, 179.1 km (111.3 mi)

Rank	Rider	Team	Time
Official results
1	(Russia) Alexander Porsev	Team Katusha	4h 27' 46"
2	(Germany) Rüdiger Selig	Bora–Argon 18	s.t.
3	(Italy) Kristian Sbaragli	Team Dimension Data	s.t.
4	(Belgium) Bert Van Lerberghe	Topsport Vlaanderen–Baloise	s.t.
5	(United Kingdom) Andrew Fenn	Team Sky	s.t.
6	(Slovenia) David Per	Adria Mobil	s.t.
7	(Russia) Roman Maikin	Gazprom–RusVelo	s.t.
8	(Italy) Sacha Modolo	Lampre–Merida	s.t.
9	(Italy) Michele Viola	Meridiana–Kamen	s.t.
10	(Italy) Elia Viviani	Team Sky	s.t.

== Classification leadership ==
Classification leadership by stage
Stage	Winner	General classification	Points classification	Mountains classification	Young rider classification	Team classification
1	Jens Keukeleire	Jens Keukeleire	Jens Keukeleire	Marek Čanecký	Lorenzo Rota	Lampre–Merida
2	Rein Taaramäe	Rein Taaramäe	Jack Haig	Jan Tratnik	Egan Bernal	Androni Giocattoli–Sidermec
3	Diego Ulissi	Rein Taaramäe	Jack Haig	Jan Tratnik	Egan Bernal	Androni Giocattoli–Sidermec
4	Alexander Porsev	Rein Taaramäe	Jack Haig	Jan Tratnik	Egan Bernal	Androni Giocattoli–Sidermec
Final		Rein Taaramäe	Jack Haig	Jan Tratnik	Egan Bernal	Androni Giocattoli–Sidermec

== Final classification standings ==
Legend
General classification	Denotes the winner of the General classification	Points classification	Denotes the winner of the Points classification
Mountains classification	Denotes the winner of the Mountains classification	Young rider classification	Denotes the winner of the Young rider classification

=== General classification ===
Rank	Rider	Team	Time
1	(Estonia) Rein Taaramäe	Team Katusha	15h 10' 29"
2	(Australia) Jack Haig	Orica–GreenEDGE	+ 1' 42"
3	(Czech Republic) Jan Bárta	Bora–Argon 18	+ 2' 38"
4	(Colombia) Egan Bernal	Androni Giocattoli–Sidermec	+ 2' 47"
5	(Slovenia) Jure Golčer	Adria Mobil	+ 2' 48"
6	(Belgium) Eliot Lietaer	Topsport Vlaanderen–Baloise	+ 2' 57"
7	(Portugal) José Mendes	Bora–Argon 18	+ 3' 00"
8	(Russia) Pavel Kochetkov	Team Katusha	+ 3' 14"
9	(Slovenia) Janez Brajkovič	Slovenia (national)	+ 3' 15"
10	(Italy) Franco Pellizotti	Androni Giocattoli–Sidermec	+ 3' 27"

=== Points classification ===
Rank	Rider	Team	Points
1	(Australia) Jack Haig	Orica–GreenEDGE	46
2	(Italy) Diego Ulissi	Lampre–Merida	45
3	(Estonia) Rein Taaramäe	Team Katusha	45
4	(Belgium) Jens Keukeleire	Orica–GreenEDGE	28
5	(Russia) Alexander Porsev	Team Katusha	25
6	(Spain) Omar Fraile	Team Dimension Data	25
7	(Italy) Kristian Sbaragli	Team Dimension Data	23
8	(Germany) Rüdiger Selig	Bora–Argon 18	20
9	(Slovenia) Jon Božič	Adria Mobil	19
10	(Italy) Michele Viola	Meridiana–Kamen	18

=== Mountains classification ===
Rank	Rider	Team	Points
1	(Slovenia) Jan Tratnik	Amplatz–BMC	17
2	(Belgium) Preben Van Hecke	Topsport Vlaanderen–Baloise	16
3	(Estonia) Rein Taaramäe	Team Katusha	12
4	(Italy) Iuri Filosi	Nippo–Vini Fantini	10
5	(Italy) Michele Gazzara	Norda–MG.K Vis Vega	9
6	(Australia) Jack Haig	Orica–GreenEDGE	8
7	(Belgium) Kenny De Ketele	Topsport Vlaanderen–Baloise	8
8	(Slovenia) Jon Božič	Adria Mobil	7
9	(Colombia) Egan Bernal	Androni Giocattoli–Sidermec	6
10	(Belgium) Jens Wallays	Topsport Vlaanderen–Baloise	6

=== Young rider classification ===
Rank	Rider	Team	Time
1	(Colombia) Egan Bernal	Androni Giocattoli–Sidermec	15h 13' 16"
2	(Italy) Gianni Moscon	Team Sky	+ 1' 17"
3	(Italy) Lorenzo Rota	Bardiani–CSF	+ 2' 17"
4	(Slovenia) Žiga Ručigaj	Radenska–Ljubljana	+ 14' 52"
5	(Germany) Nils Politt	Team Katusha	+ 18' 17"
6	(Slovenia) Matej Mohorič	Lampre–Merida	+ 18' 19"
7	(Croatia) Bruno Maltar	Radenska–Ljubljana	+ 21' 05"
8	(Slovenia) David Per	Adria Mobil	+ 22' 42"
9	(Austria) Gregor Mühlberger	Bora–Argon 18	+ 23' 50"
10	(Italy) Simone Velasco	Bardiani–CSF	+ 23' 53"

=== Team classification ===
Rank	Team	Time
1	(Italy) Androni Giocattoli–Sidermec	45h 40' 44"
2	(Germany) Bora–Argon 18	+ 2' 51"
3	(Italy) Norda–MG.K Vis Vega	+ 8' 26"
4	(Belgium) Topsport Vlaanderen–Baloise	+ 9' 39"
5	(Russia) Team Katusha	+ 11' 12"
6	(Slovenia) Adria Mobil	+ 12' 55"
7	(Italy) Bardiani–CSF	+ 14' 05"
8	(Russia) Tinkoff	+ 14' 34"
9	(Austria) Amplatz–BMC	+ 20' 27"
10	(Italy) Lampre–Merida	+ 24' 57"
