= 2019 Tour of Slovenia =

2019 UCI Europe Tour (2.HC)
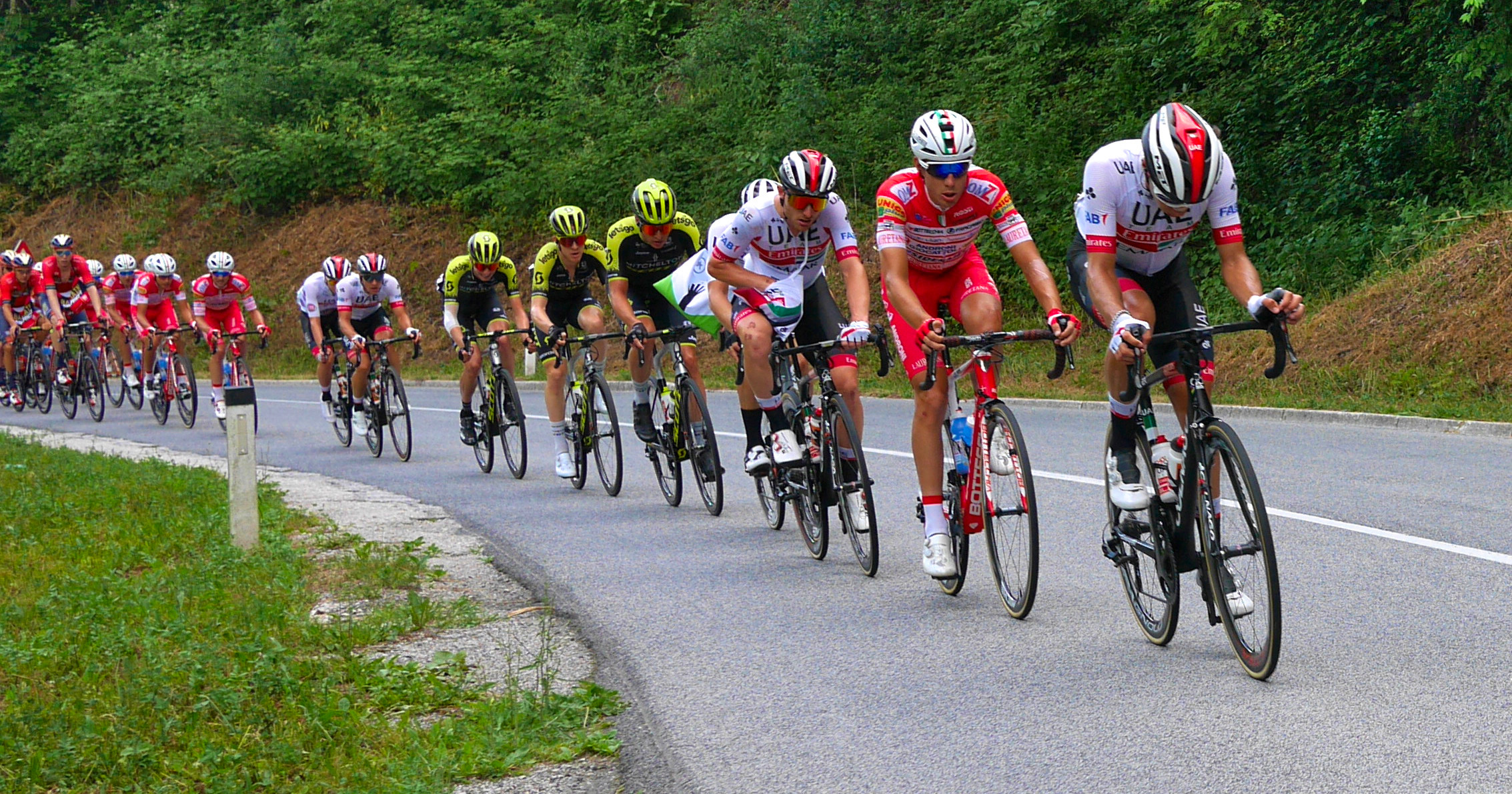
- Peloton on Stage 3

Race details
- Dates: 19–23 June
- Stages: 5
- Distance: 808.5 km (502.4 mi)
- Winning time: 19h 41' 23"

Results
Jersey awarded to the overall winner	Winner	(Italy) Diego Ulissi	(UAE Team Emirates)
	Second	(Italy) Giovanni Visconti	(Neri Sottoli–Selle Italia–KTM)
	Third	(Russia) Aleksandr Vlasov	(Gazprom–RusVelo)
Jersey awarded to the points classification winner	Points	(Slovenia) Luka Mezgec	(Mitchelton–Scott)
Jersey awarded to the mountains classification winner	Mountains	(Russia) Aleksandr Vlasov	(Gazprom–RusVelo)
Jersey awarded to the youth classification winner	Youth	(Slovenia) Tadej Pogačar	(UAE Team Emirates)
	Team	(United Arab Emirates) UAE Team Emirates	

The 2019 Tour of Slovenia (Slovene: Dirka po Sloveniji) was the 26th edition of the Tour of Slovenia cycling stage race, held between 19 and 23 June 2019.It was organised as a 2.HC race on the UCI Europe Tour, consisted of 5 stages in total.

The race andvanced from 2.1 into the higher class of competition.

After attacking on the climb to Dole on stage 3, Diego Ulissi (UAE Team Emirates) won this race for the second time, with his first overall victory coming in 2011.

== Teams ==
18 teams, which consisted of five UCI WorldTour teams, eight UCI Professional Continental teams, five UCI Continental teams, and one national team, participated in the race. Each team entered seven riders, except for Bahrain–Merida, Meridiana–Kamen, Nippo–Vini Fantini–Faizanè, and UAE Team Emirates (each with six riders).

Of the 129 riders who began the race, only 109 riders finished the race.

UCI WorldTeams

- Bahrain–Merida
- Bora–Hansgrohe
- Mitchelton–Scott
- Team Dimension Data
- UAE Team Emirates

UCI Professional Continental Teams

- Androni Giocattoli–Sidermec
- Bardiani–CSF
- Delko–Marseille Provence
- Gazprom–RusVelo
- Israel Cycling Academy
- Neri Sottoli–Selle Italia–KTM
- Nippo–Vini Fantini–Faizanè
- Team Novo Nordisk

UCI Continental Teams

- AC Sparta Praha
- Adria Mobil
- Team Felbermayr–Simplon Wels
- Ljubljana Gusto Santic
- Meridiana–Kamen

National Teams

- Slovenia

== Route and stages ==
Stage	Date	Course	Distance	Type	Winner
1	19 June	Ljubljana – Rogaška Slatina	171 km (106 mi)	Flat stage	(Germany) Pascal Ackermann
2	20 June	Maribor – Celje	146.3 km (90.9 mi)	Hilly stage	(Slovenia) Luka Mezgec
3	21 June	Žalec – Idrija	169.8 km (105.5 mi)	Hilly stage	(Italy) Diego Ulissi
4	22 June	Nova Gorica – Ajdovščina	153.9 km (95.6 mi)	Mountain stage	(Italy) Giovanni Visconti
5	23 June	Trebnje – Novo mesto	167.5 km (104.1 mi)	Hilly stage	(Italy) Giacomo Nizzolo
Total		808.5 km (502.4 mi)			

=== Stage 1 ===
19 June 2019 — Ljubljana to Rogaška Slatina, 171 km (106 mi)

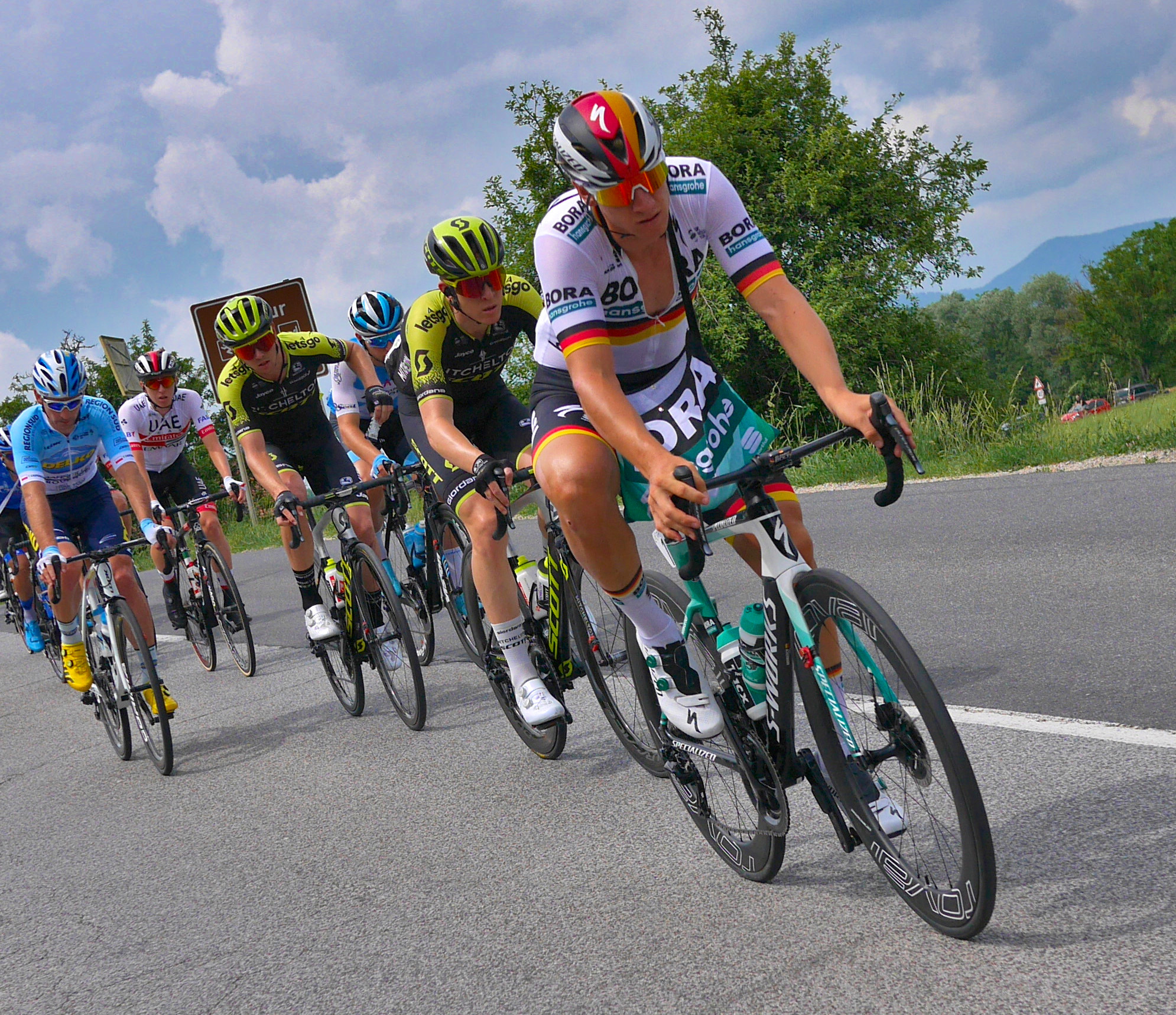
Pascal Ackermann (Bora–Hansgrohe, pictured on Stage 1) winner of Stage 1

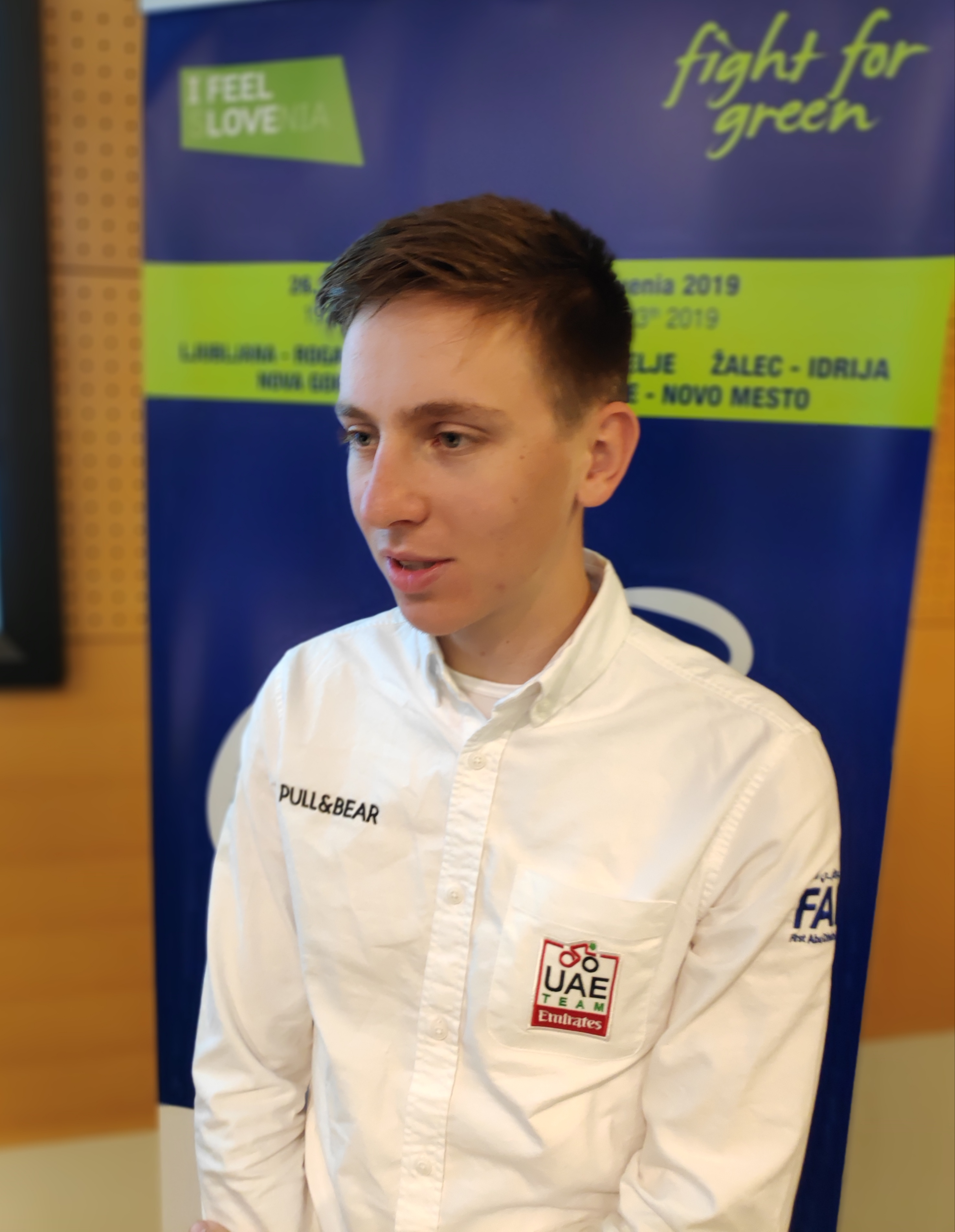
Tadej Pogačar was one of the favourites to win, but finished in 4th place helping teammate Diego Ulissi win his 2nd race here.

Rank	Rider	Team	Time
Official results
1	(Germany) Pascal Ackermann	Bora–Hansgrohe	4h 04' 58"
2	(Italy) Giacomo Nizzolo	Team Dimension Data	+ 0"
3	(Italy) Simone Consonni	UAE Team Emirates	+ 0"
4	(Slovenia) Luka Mezgec	Mitchelton–Scott	+ 0"
5	(Italy) Andrea Vendrame	Androni Giocattoli–Sidermec	+ 0"
6	(Portugal) Rui Oliveira	UAE Team Emirates	+ 0"
7	(Slovenia) Grega Bole	Bahrain–Merida	+ 0"
8	(France) Jérémy Leveau	Delko–Marseille Provence	+ 0"
9	(Italy) Kristian Sbaragli	Israel Cycling Academy	+ 0"
10	(Italy) Umberto Marengo	Neri Sottoli–Selle Italia–KTM	+ 0"
General classification after the stage
1	(Germany) Pascal Ackermann	Bora–Hansgrohe	4h 04' 48"
2	(Italy) Giacomo Nizzolo	Team Dimension Data	+ 4"
3	(Italy) Simone Consonni	UAE Team Emirates	+ 6"
4	(Italy) Diego Ulissi	UAE Team Emirates	+ 7"
5	(Slovenia) Aljaž Jarc	Adria Mobil	+ 7"
6	(Italy) Matteo Busato	Androni Giocattoli–Sidermec	+ 8"
7	(Austria) Matthias Krizek	Team Felbermayr–Simplon Wels	+ 9"
8	(Slovenia) Luka Mezgec	Mitchelton–Scott	+ 10"
9	(Italy) Andrea Vendrame	Androni Giocattoli–Sidermec	+ 10"
10	(Portugal) Rui Oliveira	UAE Team Emirates	+ 10"

=== Stage 2 ===
20 June 2019 — Maribor to Celje, 146.3 km (90.9 mi)

Rank	Rider	Team	Time
Official results
1	(Slovenia) Luka Mezgec	Mitchelton–Scott	3h 35' 55"
2	(Slovenia) Grega Bole	Bahrain–Merida	+ 0"
3	(Italy) Andrea Vendrame	Androni Giocattoli–Sidermec	+ 0"
4	(Italy) Giovanni Visconti	Neri Sottoli–Selle Italia–KTM	+ 0"
5	(Italy) Diego Ulissi	UAE Team Emirates	+ 0"
6	(Russia) Aleksandr Vlasov	Gazprom–RusVelo	+ 0"
7	(Belgium) Ben Hermans	Israel Cycling Academy	+ 0"
8	(Russia) Ivan Rovny	Gazprom–RusVelo	+ 0"
9	(Slovenia) Tadej Pogačar	UAE Team Emirates	+ 0"
10	(Australia) Jay McCarthy	Bora–Hansgrohe	+ 0"
General classification after the stage
1	(Slovenia) Luka Mezgec	Mitchelton–Scott	7h 40' 43"
2	(Slovenia) Grega Bole	Bahrain–Merida	+ 4"
3	(Italy) Andrea Vendrame	Androni Giocattoli–Sidermec	+ 6"
4	(Italy) Diego Ulissi	UAE Team Emirates	+ 7"
5	(Belgium) Ben Hermans	Israel Cycling Academy	+ 10"
6	(Russia) Aleksandr Vlasov	Gazprom–RusVelo	+ 10"
7	(Russia) Ivan Rovny	Gazprom–RusVelo	+ 10"
8	(Slovenia) Tadej Pogačar	UAE Team Emirates	+ 10"
9	(Italy) Iuri Filosi	Delko–Marseille Provence	+ 10"
10	(Slovenia) Jan Polanc	UAE Team Emirates	+ 10"

=== Stage 3 ===
21 June 2019 — Žalec to Idrija, 169.8 km (105.5 mi)

Rank	Rider	Team	Time
Official results
1	(Italy) Diego Ulissi	UAE Team Emirates	3h 58' 01"
2	(Russia) Aleksandr Vlasov	Gazprom–RusVelo	+ 12"
3	(Italy) Giovanni Visconti	Neri Sottoli–Selle Italia–KTM	+ 17"
4	(Italy) Andrea Vendrame	Androni Giocattoli–Sidermec	+ 17"
5	(Slovenia) Tadej Pogačar	UAE Team Emirates	+ 17"
6	(Slovenia) Jan Polanc	UAE Team Emirates	+ 17"
7	(Colombia) Esteban Chaves	Mitchelton–Scott	+ 17"
8	(Belgium) Ben Hermans	Israel Cycling Academy	+ 17"
9	(Italy) Fausto Masnada	Androni Giocattoli–Sidermec	+ 19"
10	(Slovenia) Luka Mezgec	Mitchelton–Scott	+ 2' 08"
General classification after the stage
1	(Italy) Diego Ulissi	UAE Team Emirates	11h 38' 41"
2	(Russia) Aleksandr Vlasov	Gazprom–RusVelo	+ 19"
3	(Italy) Andrea Vendrame	Androni Giocattoli–Sidermec	+ 26"
4	(Italy) Giovanni Visconti	Neri Sottoli–Selle Italia–KTM	+ 26"
5	(Belgium) Ben Hermans	Israel Cycling Academy	+ 30"
6	(Slovenia) Tadej Pogačar	UAE Team Emirates	+ 30"
7	(Slovenia) Jan Polanc	UAE Team Emirates	+ 30"
8	(Colombia) Esteban Chaves	Mitchelton–Scott	+ 30"
9	(Italy) Fausto Masnada	Androni Giocattoli–Sidermec	+ 36"
10	(Slovenia) Luka Mezgec	Mitchelton–Scott	+ 2' 11"

=== Stage 4 ===
22 June 2019 — Nova Gorica to Ajdovščina, 153.9 km (95.6 mi)

Rank	Rider	Team	Time
Official results
1	(Italy) Giovanni Visconti	Neri Sottoli–Selle Italia–KTM	4h 00' 53"
2	(Italy) Diego Ulissi	UAE Team Emirates	+ 0"
3	(Slovenia) Tadej Pogačar	UAE Team Emirates	+ 0"
4	(Russia) Aleksandr Vlasov	Gazprom–RusVelo	+ 0"
5	(Italy) Andrea Vendrame	Androni Giocattoli–Sidermec	+ 32"
6	(Colombia) Esteban Chaves	Mitchelton–Scott	+ 32"
7	(Italy) Fausto Masnada	Androni Giocattoli–Sidermec	+ 32"
8	(Belgium) Ben Hermans	Israel Cycling Academy	+ 1' 38"
9	(Australia) Cameron Meyer	Mitchelton–Scott	+ 2' 22"
10	(Italy) Lorenzo Rota	Bardiani–CSF	+ 2' 22"
General classification after the stage
1	(Italy) Diego Ulissi	UAE Team Emirates	15h 39' 28"
2	(Italy) Giovanni Visconti	Neri Sottoli–Selle Italia–KTM	+ 22"
3	(Russia) Aleksandr Vlasov	Gazprom–RusVelo	+ 25"
4	(Slovenia) Tadej Pogačar	UAE Team Emirates	+ 30"
5	(Italy) Andrea Vendrame	Androni Giocattoli–Sidermec	+ 1' 04"
6	(Colombia) Esteban Chaves	Mitchelton–Scott	+ 1' 08"
7	(Italy) Fausto Masnada	Androni Giocattoli–Sidermec	+ 1' 14"
8	(Belgium) Ben Hermans	Israel Cycling Academy	+ 2' 14"
9	(Slovenia) Jan Polanc	UAE Team Emirates	+ 2' 58"
10	(Croatia) Radoslav Rogina	Adria Mobil	+ 4' 49"

=== Stage 5 ===
23 June 2019 — Trebnje to Novo Mesto, 167.5 km (104.1 mi)

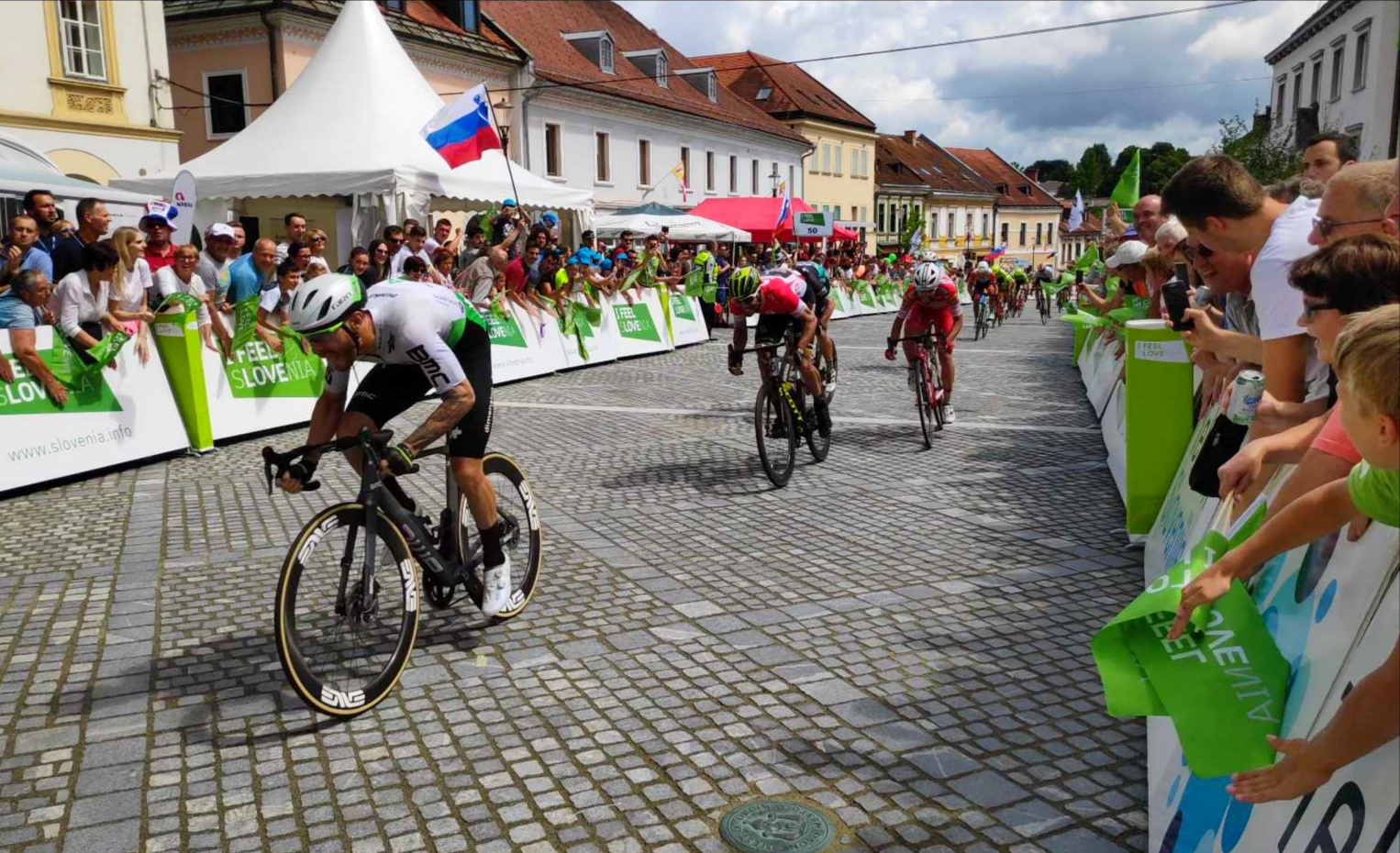
Giacomo Nizzolo (Team Dimension Data) sprinting for the Stage 5 victory ahead of Luka Mezgec (Mitchelton–Scott), winner of Stage 2 and overall winner of the points classification (red jersey)

Rank	Rider	Team	Time
Official results
1	(Italy) Giacomo Nizzolo	Team Dimension Data	4h 01' 55"
2	(Slovenia) Luka Mezgec	Mitchelton–Scott	+ 0"
3	(New Zealand) Shane Archbold	Bora–Hansgrohe	+ 0"
4	(Italy) Andrea Vendrame	Androni Giocattoli–Sidermec	+ 0"
5	(Italy) Davide Cimolai	Israel Cycling Academy	+ 0"
6	(Italy) Vincenzo Albanese	Bardiani–CSF	+ 0"
7	(Italy) Umberto Marengo	Neri Sottoli–Selle Italia–KTM	+ 0"
8	(Slovenia) Tadej Pogačar	UAE Team Emirates	+ 0"
9	(Italy) Simone Velasco	Neri Sottoli–Selle Italia–KTM	+ 0"
10	(Italy) Giovanni Visconti	Neri Sottoli–Selle Italia–KTM	+ 0"
General classification after the stage
1	(Italy) Diego Ulissi	UAE Team Emirates	19h 41' 23"
2	(Italy) Giovanni Visconti	Neri Sottoli–Selle Italia–KTM	+ 22"
3	(Russia) Aleksandr Vlasov	Gazprom–RusVelo	+ 25"
4	(Slovenia) Tadej Pogačar	UAE Team Emirates	+ 30"
5	(Italy) Andrea Vendrame	Androni Giocattoli–Sidermec	+ 1' 04"
6	(Colombia) Esteban Chaves	Mitchelton–Scott	+ 1' 08"
7	(Italy) Fausto Masnada	Androni Giocattoli–Sidermec	+ 1' 21"
8	(Belgium) Ben Hermans	Israel Cycling Academy	+ 2' 21"
9	(Slovenia) Jan Polanc	UAE Team Emirates	+ 3' 17"
10	(Italy) Lorenzo Rota	Bardiani–CSF	+ 4' 49"

== Classification leadership ==
Classification leadership by stage
Stage	Winner	General classification	Points classification	Mountains classification	Young rider classification	Team classification
1	Pascal Ackermann	Pascal Ackermann	Pascal Ackermann	Aljaž Jarc	Aljaž Jarc	UAE Team Emirates
2	Luka Mezgec	Luka Mezgec	Luka Mezgec	Aleksandr Vlasov	Tadej Pogačar	UAE Team Emirates
3	Diego Ulissi	Diego Ulissi	Luka Mezgec	Aleksandr Vlasov	Tadej Pogačar	UAE Team Emirates
4	Giovanni Visconti	Diego Ulissi	Diego Ulissi	Aleksandr Vlasov	Tadej Pogačar	UAE Team Emirates
5	Giacomo Nizzolo	Diego Ulissi	Luka Mezgec	Aleksandr Vlasov	Tadej Pogačar	UAE Team Emirates
Final		Diego Ulissi	Luka Mezgec	Aleksandr Vlasov	Tadej Pogačar	UAE Team Emirates

== Final classification standings ==
Legend
Denotes the winner of the general classification	Denotes the winner of the mountains classification
Denotes the winner of the points classification	Denotes the winner of the young rider classification

=== General classification ===
Rank	Rider	Team	Time
1	(Italy) Diego Ulissi	UAE Team Emirates	19h 41' 23"
2	(Italy) Giovanni Visconti	Neri Sottoli–Selle Italia–KTM	+ 22"
3	(Russia) Aleksandr Vlasov	Gazprom–RusVelo	+ 25"
4	(Slovenia) Tadej Pogačar	UAE Team Emirates	+ 30"
5	(Italy) Andrea Vendrame	Androni Giocattoli–Sidermec	+ 1' 04"
6	(Colombia) Esteban Chaves	Mitchelton–Scott	+ 1' 08"
7	(Italy) Fausto Masnada	Androni Giocattoli–Sidermec	+ 1' 21"
8	(Belgium) Ben Hermans	Israel Cycling Academy	+ 2' 21"
9	(Slovenia) Jan Polanc	UAE Team Emirates	+ 3' 17"
10	(Italy) Lorenzo Rota	Bardiani–CSF	+ 4' 49"

=== Points classification ===
Rank	Rider	Team	Points
1	(Slovenia) Luka Mezgec	Mitchelton–Scott	80
2	(Italy) Andrea Vendrame	Androni Giocattoli–Sidermec	68
3	(Italy) Diego Ulissi	UAE Team Emirates	67
4	(Italy) Giovanni Visconti	Neri Sottoli–Selle Italia–KTM	61
5	(Russia) Aleksandr Vlasov	Gazprom–RusVelo	47
6	(Slovenia) Tadej Pogačar	UAE Team Emirates	46
7	(Italy) Giacomo Nizzolo	Team Dimension Data	45
8	(Slovenia) Grega Bole	Bahrain–Merida	34
9	(Belgium) Ben Hermans	Israel Cycling Academy	26
10	(Colombia) Esteban Chaves	Mitchelton–Scott	25

=== Mountains classification ===
Rank	Rider	Team	Points
1	(Russia) Aleksandr Vlasov	Gazprom–RusVelo	24
2	(Italy) Diego Ulissi	UAE Team Emirates	16
3	(Australia) Benjamin Hill	Ljubljana Gusto Santic	14
4	(Slovenia) Tadej Pogačar	UAE Team Emirates	13
5	(Colombia) Esteban Chaves	Mitchelton–Scott	5
6	(Italy) Matteo Montaguti	Androni Giocattoli–Sidermec	5
7	(Italy) Giovanni Visconti	Neri Sottoli–Selle Italia–KTM	4
8	(Italy) Lorenzo Fortunato	Neri Sottoli–Selle Italia–KTM	4
9	(Slovenia) Aljaž Jarc	Adria Mobil	3
10	(Slovenia) Rok Korošec	Ljubljana Gusto Santic	3

=== Young rider classification ===
Rank	Rider	Team	Time
1	(Slovenia) Tadej Pogačar	UAE Team Emirates	19h 41' 53"
2	(Italy) Daniel Savini	Bardiani–CSF	+ 10' 52"
3	(Spain) Joan Bou	Nippo–Vini Fantini–Faizanè	+ 18' 28"
4	(Slovenia) Kristjan Hočevar	Slovenia	+ 19' 01"
5	(Slovenia) Martin Lavrič	Slovenia	+ 24' 42"
6	(Slovenia) Aljaž Jarc	Adria Mobil	+ 42' 21"
7	(Slovenia) Aljaž Prah	Ljubljana Gusto Santic	+ 48' 38"
8	(Slovenia) Tilen Finkšt	Ljubljana Gusto Santic	+ 49' 16"
9	(Austria) Florian Kierner	Team Felbermayr–Simplon Wels	+ 1h 02' 03"
10	(Czech Republic) František Honsa	AC Sparta Praha	+ 1h 04' 36"

=== Teams classification ===
Rank	Team	Time
1	(United Arab Emirates) UAE Team Emirates	59h 08' 02"
2	(Italy) Androni Giocattoli–Sidermec	+ 3' 34"
3	(Italy) Neri Sottoli–Selle Italia–KTM	+ 11' 32"
4	Israel Cycling Academy	+ 17' 31"
5	(Russia) Gazprom–RusVelo	+ 18' 45"
6	(Australia) Mitchelton–Scott	+ 33' 02"
7	(Italy) Bardiani–CSF	+ 44' 21"
8	Bahrain–Merida	+ 47' 12"
9	(United States) Team Novo Nordisk	+ 1h 04' 52"
10	Slovenia	+ 1h 17' 27"
