= Babilon =

Babilon refers to the following places in Poland:

- Babilon, Masovian Voivodeship
- Babilon, Pomeranian Voivodeship

== See also ==
- Babylon (disambiguation)
