= Zac Williams (cyclist) =

New Zealand cyclist (born 1995)

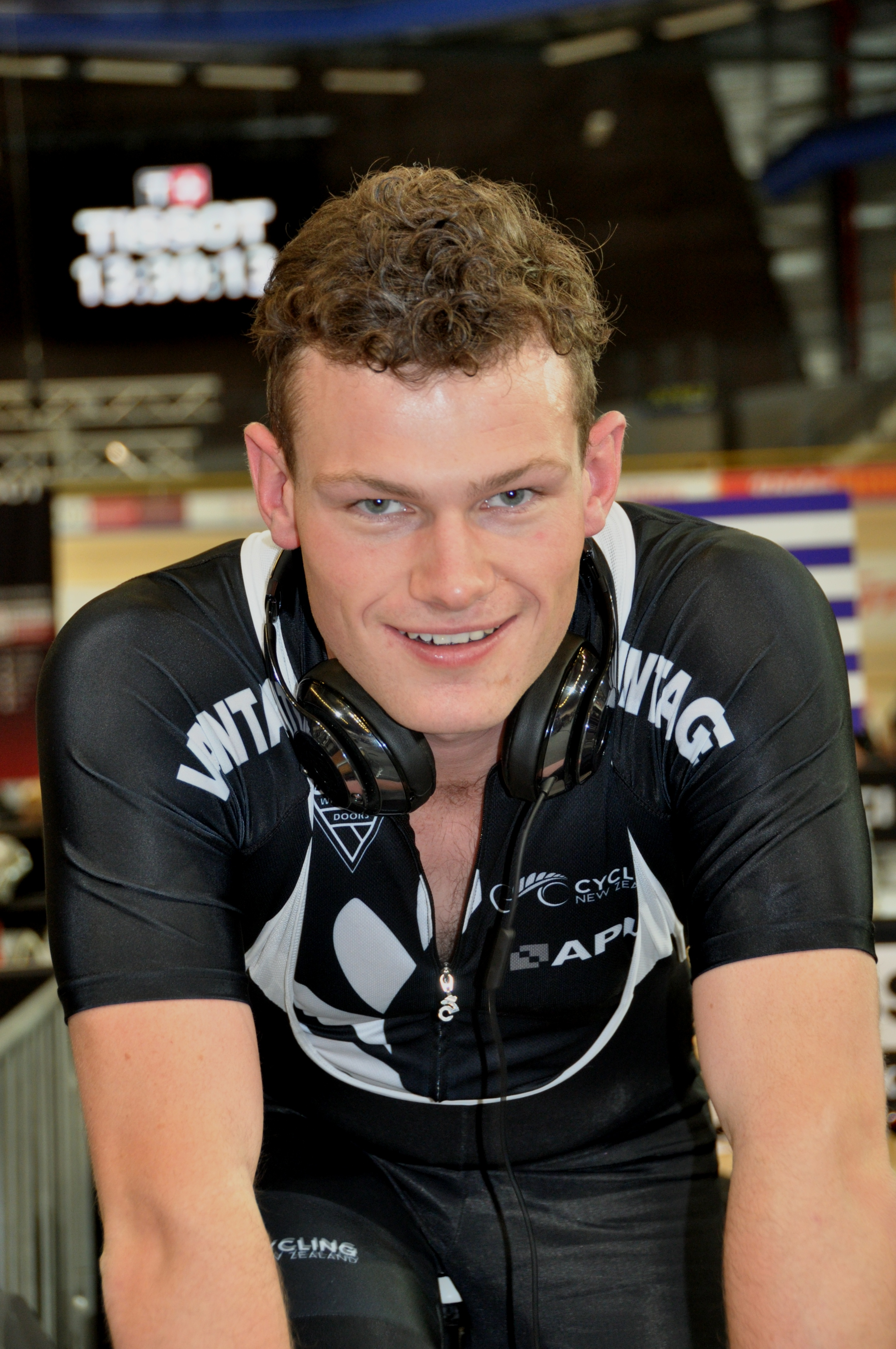

Personal information
- Nationality: New Zealand
- Born: 21 July 1995 (age 30) Auckland, New Zealand
- Height: 1.80 m (5 ft 11 in)
- Weight: 89 kg (196 lb)

Zachary Williams (born 21 July 1995) is a New Zealand cyclist.

Williams was educated at St Peter's College, Auckland.

Williams won the 1000 m time trial at the 2016 Oceania Championships and was fourth in the keirin at the World Cup in Hong Kong. He was selected for the team sprint at the 2016 Summer Olympics in Rio de Janeiro, and filled New Zealand's second place in the men's road race but dropped out of the road race after 40 km.
