= Qëndrim Guri =

Kosovan cyclist

Personal information
- Born: 27 November 1993 (age 32) Ferizaj, FR Yugoslavia
- Height: 1.75 m (5 ft 9 in)
- Weight: 69 kg (152 lb)

Cycling career
- Sport: Cycling
- Discipline: Road
- Role: Rider

Qëndrim Guri (born 27 November 1993) is a Kosovan cyclist. He competed in the road race at the 2016 Summer Olympics as well as the road race at the 2015 European Games.

== Major results ==
2011
3rd Overall Tour of Kosovo
2014
1st Road race, National Road Championships
2015
1st Road race, National Road Championships
2016
National Road Championships

2nd Time trial
3rd Road race
