= Diocese of Babylon =

Diocese/Archidocese/Province/Patriarchate of Babylon (the office and area) or Bishop/Archbishop/Patriarch of Babylon (the person) may refer to:

Babylon, Mesopotamia

- Abdias of Babylon, first bishop of Babylon, one of the Seventy Apostles
- Polychronius, bishop of Babylon; July 30 (Eastern Orthodox liturgics) commemorates his martyrdom in AD 251
- Patriarch of the Church of the East or Patriarch of Babylon
  - List of patriarchs of the Church of the East
  - Patriarchal Province of Seleucia-Ctesiphon, or the diocese of Seleucia-Ctesiphon within the province
  - Chaldean Catholic Patriarchate of Baghdad, established after the 1552 schism, based in Baghdad (formerly Babylon)
    - List of Chaldean Catholic patriarchs of Baghdad (formerly Babylon)
- Latin Catholic Diocese of Babylon, 1632–1848; subsequently the Archdiocese of Baghdad

Babylon, Egypt

- Diocese of Babylon, at Babylon Fortress in Coptic Cairo, Egypt; an Early Christian suffragan of Leontopolis, now a titular see
  - Bishop Babylonos, title since 2009 of the hegumen of the Monastery of St George under the Greek Orthodox Patriarchate of Alexandria
