= Pavel Kochetkov =

Russian cyclist (born 1986)

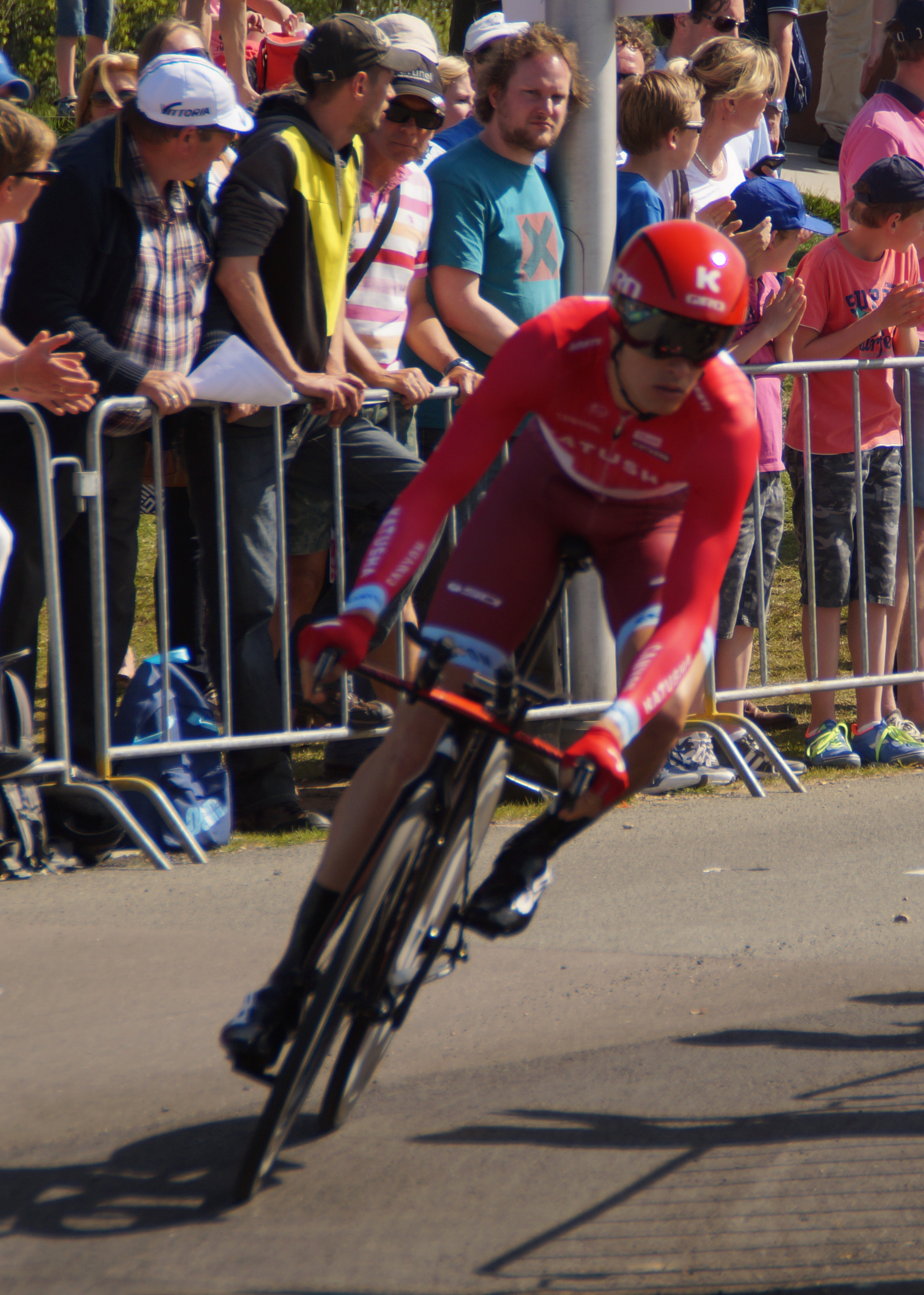
- Kochetkov at the 2016 Giro d'Italia

Personal information
- Full name: Pavel Sergeyevich Kochetkov
- Born: 7 March 1986 (age 40) Kamensk-Uralsky, Russian SFSR, Soviet Union
- Height: 1.84 m (6 ft 1/2 in)
- Weight: 72 kg (159 lb; 11 st 5 lb)

Cycling career
- Sport: Cycling
- Current team: Gazprom–RusVelo
- Discipline: Road
- Role: Rider
- Rider type: All-rounder

Amateur teams
- 2010: Zheroquadro–Radenska
- 2011–2012: Itera–Katusha

Professional teams
- 2013: RusVelo
- 2014–2019: Team Katusha
- 2020: CCC Team
- 2021–: Gazprom–RusVelo

Pavel Sergeyevich Kochetkov (Russian: Павел Сергеевич Кочетков; born 7 March 1986 in Kamensk-Uralsky) is a Russian former professional cyclist, who rode for UCI ProTeam Gazprom–RusVelo.

On 5 March 2014, he fractured his collarbone after a low-flying helicopter knocked him off his bike during the Stage 7 of the Tour de Langkawi. He was named in the start list for the 2015 Vuelta a España. In July 2018, he was named in the start list for the 2018 Tour de France.

== Major results ==
2007
1st Circuito Internazionale di Caneva
1st Stage 4 Giro delle Regioni
2nd Giro Ciclistico del Pinerolese
3rd Gran Premio di Poggiana
6th Coppa della Pace
8th Ruota d'Oro
2008
1st Trofeo Marco Rusconi
3rd Gran Premio di Poggiana
3rd Trofeo Alcide Degasperi
3rd Trofeo Salvatore Morucci
4th La Côte Picarde
5th GP Capodarco
6th Ronde van Vlaanderen U23
7th Lombardia Tour
8th Coppa della Pace
2009
1st Trofeo Città di San Vendemiano
1st Trofeo Alcide Degasperi
1st Freccia dei Vini
1st GP Inda
2nd Overall Giro della Regione Friuli Venezia Giulia
2nd Coppa della Pace
6th Gara Ciclistica Millionaria
9th Overall Giro della Valle d'Aosta
2010
4th Grand Prix Südkärnten
2011
1st Stage 1 Tour of Bulgaria
7th Overall Tour des Pays de Savoie

1st Stage 1

9th Overall Grand Prix of Sochi
2012
2nd Overall Czech Cycling Tour

1st Points classification

2nd Memorial Oleg Dyachenko
3rd Central European Tour Košice–Miskolc
4th Overall Tour du Loir-et-Cher
7th Overall Circuit des Ardennes

1st Stage 3 (TTT)

10th Duo Normand (with Vyacheslav Kuznetsov)
2014
10th Overall Tour de Wallonie
2015
3rd Tour of Almaty
Giro d'Italia

Held after Stages 3–4

2016
1st Road race, National Road Championships
8th Overall Tour of Slovenia

=== Grand Tour general classification results timeline ===
Grand Tour	2015	2016	2017	2018	2019	2020
Giro d'Italia	37	32	DNF	—	—	DNF
Tour de France	—	—	—	61	—	—
Vuelta a España	76	39	—	53	98	—

Legend
—	Did not compete
DNF	Did not finish
