= Babilônia =

Babilônia may refer to:

- Babilônia (album), a 1978 album by Rita Lee & Tutti Frutti
- Babilônia (TV series), a 2015 Brazilian telenovela
- Morro da Babilônia, a favela in the Leme neighbourhood of Rio de Janeiro

== See also ==
- Babilonia (disambiguation)
