= Babylon (Domažlice District) =

- Municipality
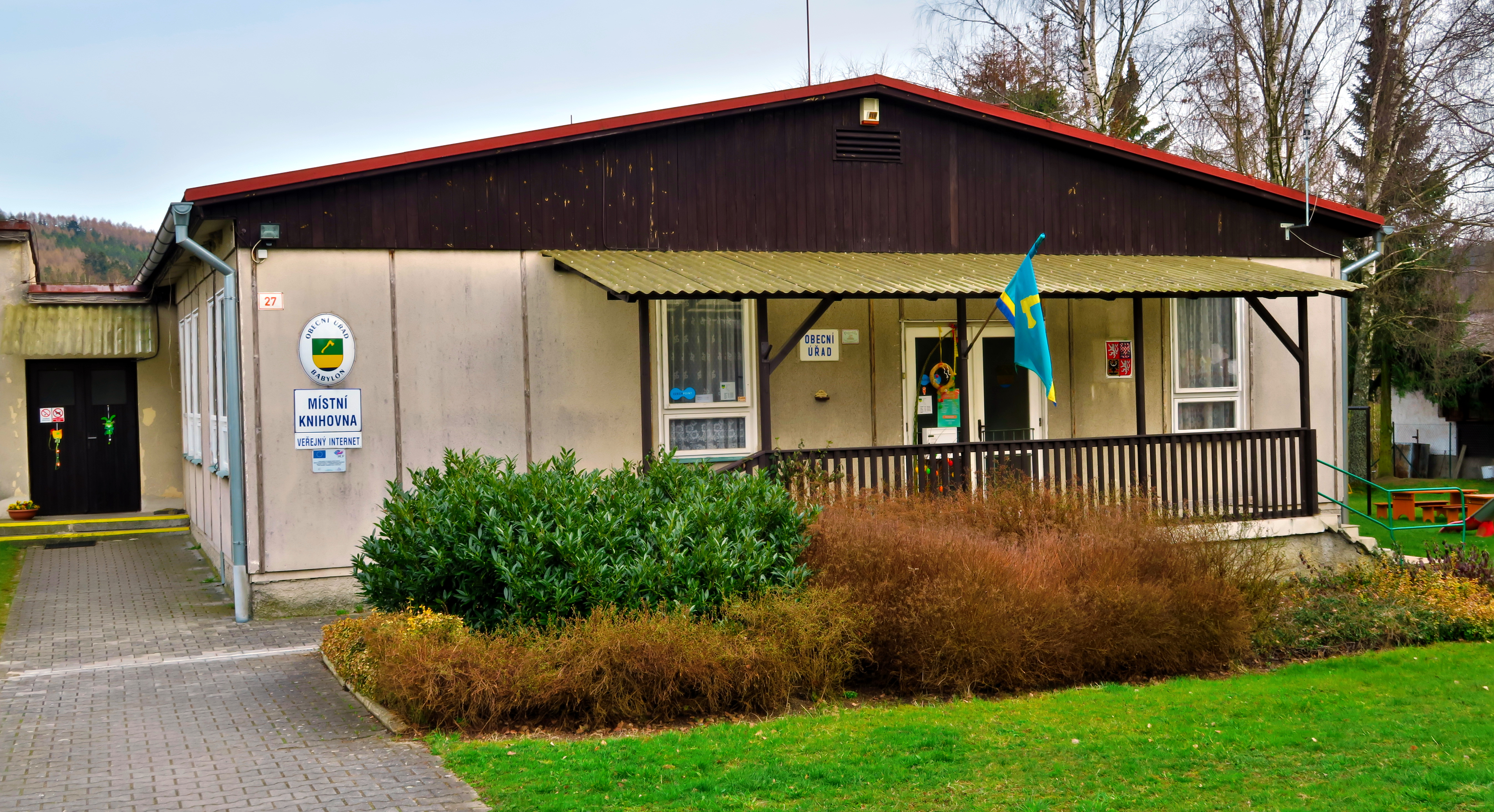
- Municipal office

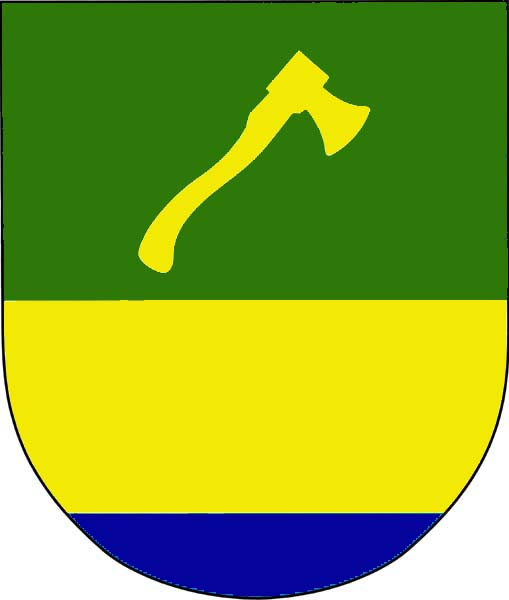
- Flag Coat of arms

- Location in the Czech Republic
- Coordinates: 49°23′56″N 12°51′46″E
- Country: Czech Republic
- Region: Plzeň
- District: Domažlice
- First mentioned: 1587

Area
  - Total: 6.65 km^{2} (2.57 sq mi)
- Elevation: 473 m (1,552 ft)

Population (2026-01-01)
  - Total: 377
  - Density: 56.7/km^{2} (147/sq mi)
- Time zone: UTC+1 (CET)
  - Summer (DST): UTC+2 (CEST)
- Postal code: 344 01
- Website: www.babylon-obec.cz

Babylon (German: Babilon) is a municipality and village in Domažlice District in the Plzeň Region of the Czech Republic. It has about 400 inhabitants.

Babylon lies approximately 8 kilometres (5 mi) south-west of Domažlice, 55 km (34 mi) south-west of Plzeň, and 137 km (85 mi) south-west of Prague.

== Demographics ==
Historical population
Year	Pop.	±%
1869	177	—
1880	170	−4.0%
1890	160	−5.9%
1900	182	+13.7%
1910	194	+6.6%
1921	201	+3.6%
1930	192	−4.5%
1950	318	+65.6%
1961	236	−25.8%
1970	213	−9.7%
1980	205	−3.8%
1991	242	+18.0%
2001	279	+15.3%
2011	296	+6.1%
2021	317	+7.1%
Source: Censuses
