= Babylon (band) =

- Origin: Florida, USA
- Genre: Progressive rock
- Years active: 1976–1978
- Labels: Mehum Music, Syn-Phonic

Babylon was a progressive rock band from St. Petersburg, Florida. Babylon was formed in 1976 by Rick Leonard, Rodney Best, Doroccas, J. David Boyko, and Gary Chambers.

== Style ==
Babylon has been compared to Marillion, Gentle Giant, Rush, and Nursery Cryme period Genesis. The members state their main influences as Gentle Giant, Van der Graaf Generator, Happy the Man, Genesis, and others.

== Discography ==
- Babylon (LP, first issue, January 1978; LP, second issue, August 1978; reissued on CD in 1999 and 2010)
- Night Over Never: Live at the Empty Keg 1 (LP, 1989) (Live at The Empty Keg, University of South Florida, Tampa, Florida, USA, 18 May 1978)
- Better Conditions for the Dead: Live at the Empty Keg 2 (LP, 1989) (Live at The Empty Keg, University of South Florida, Tampa, Florida, USA, 18 May 1978)
- Live in Concert: Better Conditions for the Dead (CDr, 2002) (Live in concert, 1977)
