= Brian Babilonia =

Puerto Rican Olympic cyclist

Personal information
- Full name: Brian Babilonia Figueroa
- Born: 16 September 1994 (age 32) Mayagüez, Puerto Rico

Cycling career
- Sport: Cycling
- Discipline: Road
- Role: Rider

Amateur teams
- 2015–2016: Ciudad de Oviedo
- 2018: CDS–LPC
- 2021: Top West
- 2022: DCN Cycling

Brian Babilonia Figueroa (born 16 September 1994) is a Puerto Rican cyclist, who represented Puerto Rico in the road race at the 2016 Rio Olympics. At that moment, he was without a professional contract, and was the first Puerto Rican cyclist to join the road race since 1996. He has previously finished third in the Puerto Rico National Road Race Championships in 2015, and third in the Puerto Rico National Time Trial Championships in 2022.

== Major results ==
2015
National Road Championships

3rd Road race

2022
National Road Championships

3rd Time Trial
