= 2012 Milano–Torino =

93rd edition of the Milano–Torino single-day cycling race

Milano–Torino
2012 UCI Europe Tour

Race details
- Dates: September 26
- Stages: 1
- Distance: 193.5 km (120.2 mi)
- Winning time: 4 hr 32 min 12 sec

Results
	Winner	Alberto Contador (Spain)	(Saxo Bank–Tinkoff Bank)
	Second	Diego Ulissi (Italy)	(Lampre–ISD)
	Third	Fredrik Kessiakoff (Sweden)	(Astana)

The 2012 Milano–Torino was the 93rd edition of the Milano–Torino single-day cycling race. It was held on 26 September 2012, over a distance of 193 km, starting near Milan in Novate Milanese and ending near Turin on the Colle di Superga ("Superga Hill").

Team Saxo Bank–Tinkoff Bank rider Alberto Contador (winner of 2012 Vuelta a España) won the race, having attacked on the final climb to Basilica di Superga, winning a "classic" for the first time in his professional career. Diego Ulissi of Lampre–ISD was second and Astana's Fredrik Kessiakoff completed the podium.

== Teams ==
The start list included 18 teams, with 11 ProTour teams, and more than 150 riders.

- Acqua & Sapone
- Ag2r–La Mondiale
- Androni Giocattoli–Venezuela
- Astana
- Colnago–CSF Bardiani
- Farnese Vini–Selle Italia
- FDJ–BigMat
- Garmin–Sharp
- RadioShack–Nissan
- Lampre–ISD
- Liquigas–Cannondale
- Omega Pharma–Quick-Step
- Saxo Bank–Tinkoff Bank
- Team Katusha
- Colombia–Coldeportes
- Utensilnord–Named
- Argos–Shimano
- Team Idea

== Results ==
	Cyclist	Team	Time
1	Alberto Contador (ESP)	Saxo Bank–Tinkoff Bank	4h 32' 12"
2	Diego Ulissi (ITA)	Lampre–ISD	+ 15"
3	Fredrik Kessiakoff (SWE)	Astana	+ 24"
4	Joaquim Rodríguez (ESP)	Team Katusha	+ 36"
5	Carlos Betancur (COL)	Acqua & Sapone	+ 43"
6	Fabio Taborre (ITA)	Acqua & Sapone	+ 43"
7	Domenico Pozzovivo (ITA)	Colnago–CSF Bardiani	+ 45"
8	Chris Anker Sørensen (DEN)	Saxo Bank–Tinkoff Bank	+ 53"
9	Vincenzo Nibali (ITA)	Liquigas–Cannondale	+ 53"
10	Franco Pellizotti (ITA)	Androni Giocattoli–Venezuela	+ 53"
