= Mouvement pour un cyclisme crédible =

Mouvement pour un Cyclisme Crédible or Movement For Credible Cycling (MPCC) is a union created on July 24, 2007 by seven sponsored teams of professional road cyclists : AG2R Prévoyance, Agritubel, Bouygues Télécom, Cofidis, Crédit Agricole, Française des Jeux and Gerolsteiner. The MPCC was created to defend the idea of a clean cycling, in particular according to the strict code of ethics established by UCI. The president of the organisation is former cyclist and team manager Roger Legeay who himself tested positive for amphetamines during his career.

March 2015 - Lampre–Merida withdraws from MPCC

July 2015 - LottoNL–Jumbo withdraws from MPCC

Sept 2015 -Astana excluded from the MPCC

Feb 2016 - Orica–GreenEDGE and Team Katusha withdraws from MPCC,

As of December 2021, the members were:

- 10 (of 19) WorldTeams: Decathlon CMA CGM Team, Red Bull–Bora–Hansgrohe, Cofidis, EF Education–EasyPost, Groupama–FDJ United, Intermarché–Wanty, NSN Cycling Team, Lotto–Intermarché, Team Qhubeka NextHash, Team Picnic–PostNL
- 16 ProTeams: Alpecin–Premier Tech, GW Erco SportFitness, Arkéa–B&B Hotels, B&B Hotels p/b KTM, Bardiani–CSF 7 Saber, Wagner Bazin WB,Burgos Burpellet BH, Caja Rural–Seguros RGA, Delko, Euskaltel–Euskadi, Gazprom–RusVelo, Equipo Kern Pharma, Team Novo Nordisk, Human Powered Health, Team Flanders–Baloise, Team TotalEnergies
- 18 Continental Teams
- 7 Women's Teams
- 7 race organisers
- 10 federations: UEC, NCF, FFC, Swiss Cycling, CI, KBWB/RLVB, F.R.M.C, ICF
- 8 sponsors
- Approx 300 individual riders (since May 2018)
