= List of Grand Tour mountains classification winners =

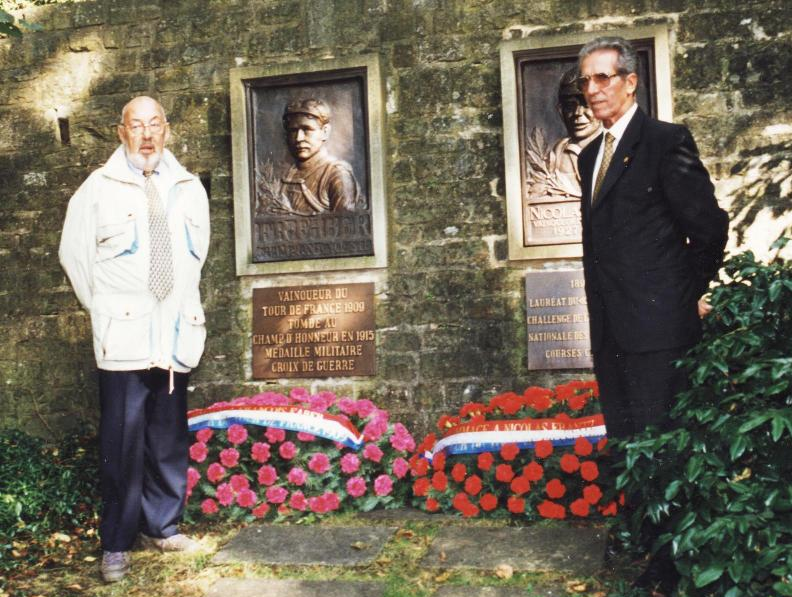
Charly Gaul (left) and Federico Bahamontes (right) have won thirteen mountains classifications at the Grand Tours between each other.

The Grand Tours are the three most prestigious multi-week stage races in professional road bicycle racing. The competitions are the Giro d'Italia, Tour de France and Vuelta a España, contested annually in that order. They are the only stage races permitted to last longer than 14 days. No cyclist has won all three Grand Tours's mountains classifications in the same year; the only cyclists to win all three Grand Tours's mountains classifications in their career are Federico Bahamontes and Luis Herrera. It is rare for cyclists to ride all Grand Tours in the same year; in 2004, 474 cyclists started in one of the Grand Tours, 68 rode two and two cyclists started all three.

Cyclists are ranked on the basis of their total wins in the three Grand Tours. When there is a tie between cyclists they are listed chronologically by the last Grand Tour they won. The majority of winners have come from Europe, however there have been a few notable victories for cyclists from other continents. Colombia, Australia, Mexico, the United States, and Venezuela are the only non-European countries to have a rider win a mountains classification, with twenty-two victories shared between the five countries.

Bahamontes and Gino Bartali, with 9 victories, have won the most mountains classifications at the Grand Tours. Lucien Van Impe is third with 8 and Richard Virenque is fourth with seven. Virenque has won the most mountains classifications at the Tour, with seven. Bartali, with seven, holds the record mountains classifications at the Giro. While, José Luis Laguía both have five victories in the mountains classification at the Vuelta.

== Winners ==
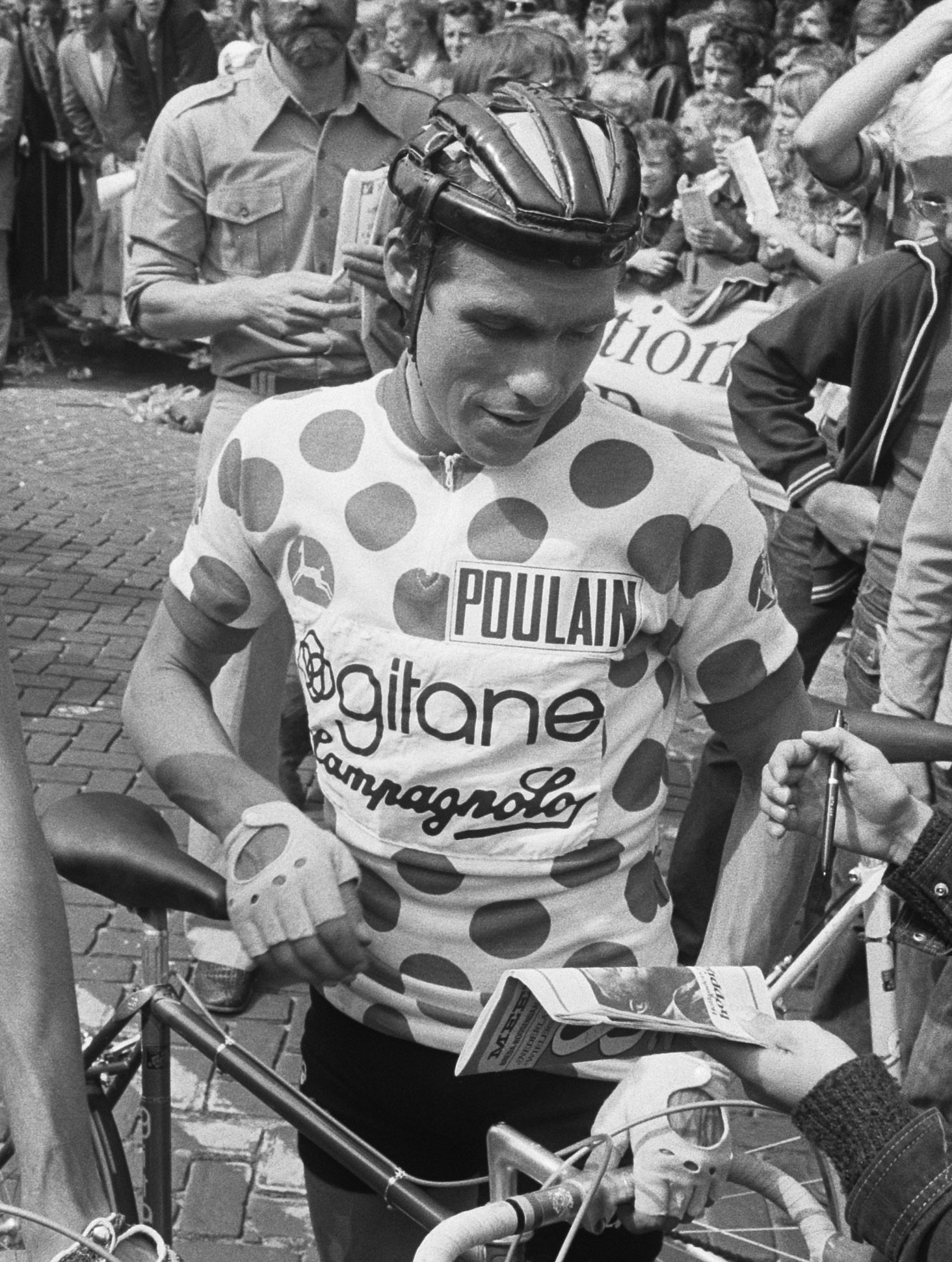
Lucien Van Impe won a total of eight mountains classifications at the Grand Tours during his career.

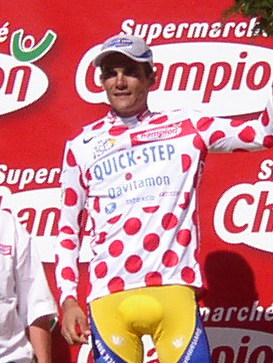
Richard Virenque won seven mountains classifications at the Grand Tour races he competed in, all in the Tour.

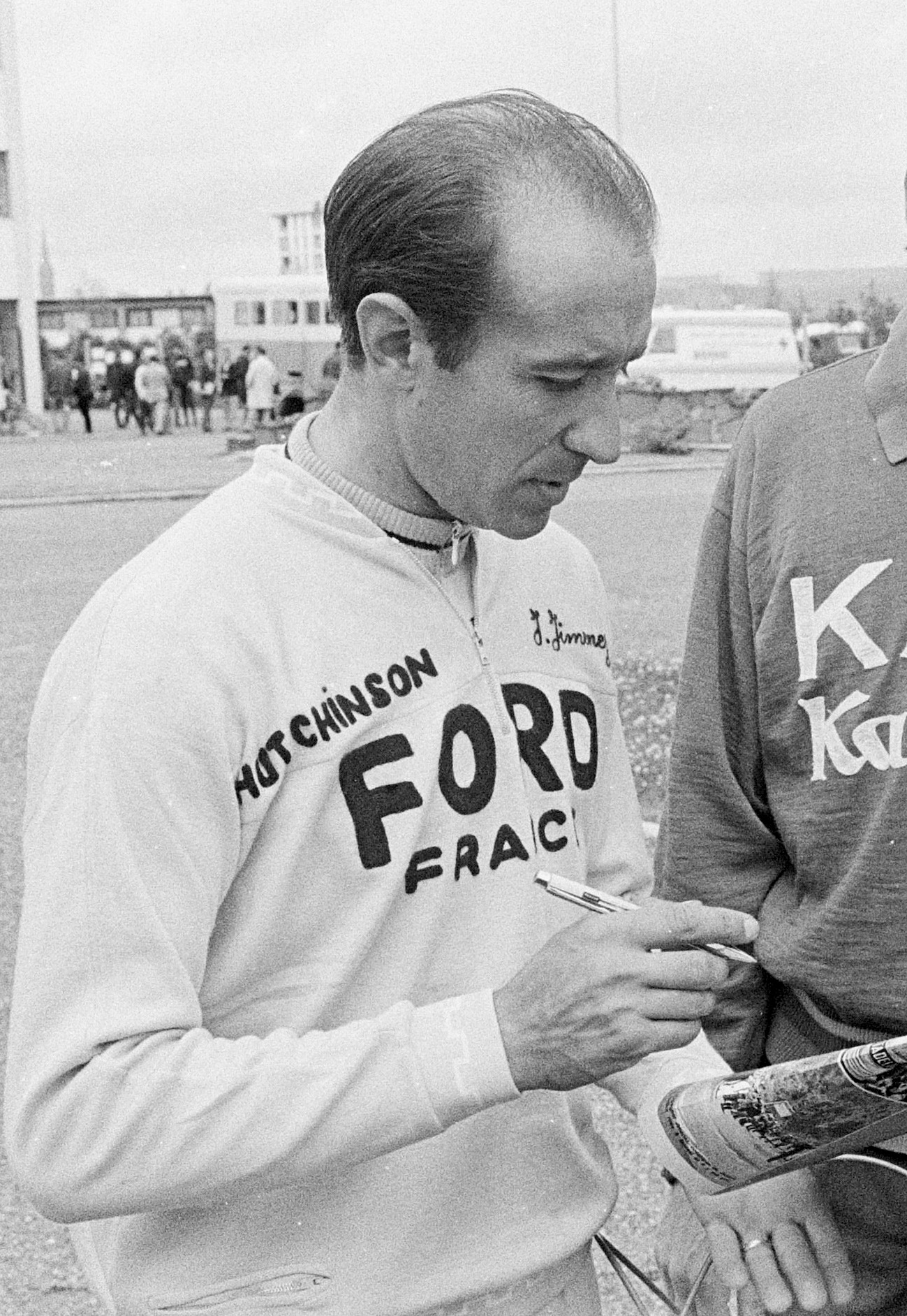
Julio Jiménez won six Grand Tour mountains classifications.

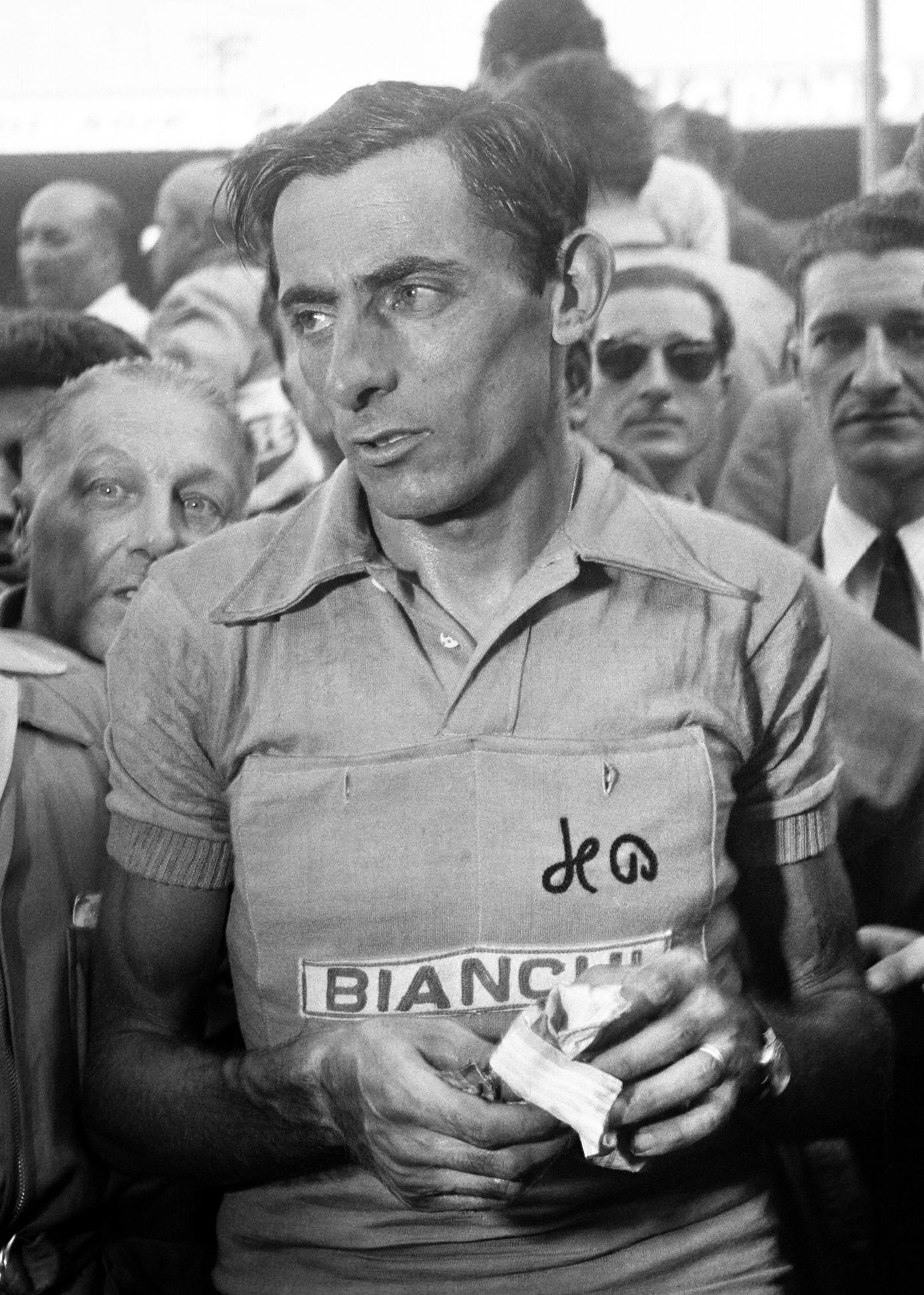
Fausto Coppi won five mountains classification at Grand Tour races in his career.

=== By cyclist ===
Riders in bold are still active. Number of wins in gold indicates the current record holder(s).

Grand Tour mountains classification winners
Rank	Cyclist	Country	Winning span	Giro	Tour	Vuelta	Total
1	Gino Bartali	Italy	1935–1948	**7**	2	0	9
1	Federico Bahamontes	Spain	1954–1964	1	6	2	9
3	Lucien Van Impe	Belgium	1971–1983	2	6	0	8
4	Richard Virenque	France	1994–2004	0	**7**	0	7
5	Julio Jiménez	Spain	1963–1967	0	3	3	6
6	Fausto Coppi	Italy	1948–1954	3	2	0	5
6	José Manuel Fuente	Spain	1971–1974	4	0	1	5
6	Andrés Oliva	Spain	1975–1978	2	0	3	5
6	José Luis Laguía	Spain	1981–1986	0	0	**5**	5
6	Luis Herrera	Colombia	1985–1991	1	2	2	5
6	Claudio Chiappucci	Italy	1990–1993	3	2	0	5
12	Charly Gaul	Luxembourg	1955–1959	2	2	0	4
12	José María Jiménez	Spain	1997–2001	0	0	4	4
12	David Moncoutié	France	2008–2011	0	0	4	4
12	**Tadej Pogačar**	Slovenia	2020–2025	1	3	0	4
16	Julián Berrendero	Spain	1936–1945	0	1	2	3
16	Emilio Rodríguez	Spain	1946–1950	0	0	3	3
16	Raphaël Géminiani	France	1951–1957	2	1	0	3
16	Antonio Karmany	Spain	1960–1962	0	0	3	3
16	Franco Bitossi	Italy	1964–1966	3	0	0	3
16	Eddy Merckx	Belgium	1968–1970	1	2	0	3
16	Claudio Bortolotto	Italy	1979–1981	3	0	0	3
16	Tony Rominger	Switzerland	1993–1996	0	1	2	3
16	Laurent Jalabert	France	1995–2002	0	2	1	3
16	**Giulio Ciccone**	Italy	2019–2026	2	1	0	3
16	**Richard Carapaz**	Ecuador	2022–2026	0	2	1	3
27	Félicien Vervaecke	Belgium	1935–1937	0	2	0	2
27	Louison Bobet	France	1950–1951	1	1	0	2
27	Gastone Nencini	Italy	1955–1957	1	1	0	2
27	Imerio Massignan	Italy	1960–1961	0	2	0	2
27	Vito Taccone	Italy	1961–1963	2	0	0	2
27	Aurelio González Puente	Spain	1967–1968	1	1	0	2
27	José Luis Abilleira	Spain	1973–1974	0	0	2	2
27	Pedro Torres	Spain	1973–1977	0	1	1	2
27	Felipe Yáñez	Spain	1979–1984	0	0	2	2
27	Robert Millar	(United Kingdom) Great Britain	1984–1987	1	1	0	2
27	Mariano Piccoli	Italy	1995–1996	2	0	0	2
27	Chepe González	Colombia	1997–1999	2	0	0	2
27	Fredy González	Colombia	2001–2003	2	0	0	2
27	Félix Cárdenas	Colombia	2003–2004	0	0	2	2
27	Michael Rasmussen	Denmark	2005–2006	0	2	0	2
27	Carlos Sastre	Spain	2000–2008	0	1	1	2
27	Egoi Martínez	Spain	2006–2009	0	1	1	2
27	Stefano Garzelli	Italy	2009–2011	2	0	0	2
27	Rafał Majka	Poland	2014–2016	0	2	0	2
27	Omar Fraile	Spain	2015–2016	0	0	2	2
27	Chris Froome	(United Kingdom) Great Britain	2015–2018	1	1	0	2
27	**Geoffrey Bouchard**	France	2019–2021	1	0	1	2
27	**Jay Vine**	Australia	2024–2025	0	0	2	2
50	Alfredo Binda	Italy	1933	1	0	0	1
50	Vicente Trueba	Spain	1933	0	1	0	1
50	Remo Bertoni	Italy	1934	1	0	0	1
50	René Vietto	France	1934	0	1	0	1
50	Edoardo Molinar	Italy	1935	0	0	1	1
50	Salvador Molina	Spain	1936	0	0	1	1
50	Giovanni Valetti	Italy	1938	1	0	0	1
50	Sylvère Maes	Belgium	1939	0	1	0	1
50	Fermín Trueba	Spain	1941	0	0	1	1
50	Pierre Brambilla	Italy	1947	0	1	0	1
50	Bernardo Ruiz	Spain	1948	0	0	1	1
50	Hugo Koblet	Switzerland	1950	1	0	0	1
50	Pasquale Fornara	Italy	1953	1	0	0	1
50	Jesús Loroño	Spain	1953	0	1	0	1
50	Giuseppe Buratti	Italy	1955	0	0	1	1
50	Nino Defilippis	Italy	1956	0	0	1	1
50	Jean Brankart	Belgium	1958	1	0	0	1
50	Antonio Suárez	Spain	1959	0	0	1	1
50	Rik Van Looy	Belgium	1960	1	0	0	1
50	Angelino Soler	Spain	1962	1	0	0	1
50	Gregorio San Miguel	Spain	1966	0	0	1	1
50	Mariano Díaz	Spain	1967	0	0	1	1
50	Francisco Gabica	Spain	1968	0	0	1	1
50	Luis Ocaña	Spain	1969	0	0	1	1
50	Claudio Michelotto	Italy	1969	1	0	0	1
50	Agustín Tamames	Spain	1970	0	0	1	1
50	Martin Van Den Bossche	Belgium	1970	1	0	0	1
50	Joop Zoetemelk	Netherlands	1971	0	0	1	1
50	Domingo Perurena	Spain	1974	0	1	0	1
50	Francisco Galdós	Spain	1975	1	0	0	1
50	Giancarlo Bellini	Italy	1976	0	1	0	1
50	Faustino Fernández Ovies	Spain	1977	1	0	0	1
50	Ueli Sutter	Switzerland	1978	1	0	0	1
50	Mariano Martínez	France	1978	0	1	0	1
50	Giovanni Battaglin	Italy	1979	0	1	0	1
50	Juan Fernández	Spain	1980	0	0	1	1
50	Raymond Martin	France	1980	0	1	0	1
50	Bernard Vallet	France	1982	0	1	0	1
50	Laurent Fignon	France	1984	1	0	0	1
50	José Luis Navarro	Spain	1985	1	0	0	1
50	Pedro Muñoz	Spain	1986	1	0	0	1
50	Bernard Hinault	France	1986	0	1	0	1
50	Álvaro Pino	Spain	1988	0	0	1	1
50	Andrew Hampsten	United States	1988	1	0	0	1
50	Steven Rooks	Netherlands	1988	0	1	0	1
50	Óscar Vargas	Colombia	1989	0	0	1	1
50	Gert-Jan Theunisse	Netherlands	1989	0	1	0	1
50	José Martín Farfán	Colombia	1990	0	0	1	1
50	Thierry Claveyrolat	France	1990	0	1	0	1
50	Iñaki Gastón	Spain	1991	1	0	0	1
50	Carlos Hernández Bailo	Spain	1992	0	0	1	1
50	Luc Leblanc	France	1994	0	0	1	1
50	Pascal Richard	Switzerland	1994	1	0	0	1
50	Marco Pantani	Italy	1998	1	0	0	1
50	Christophe Rinero	France	1998	0	1	0	1
50	Francesco Casagrande	Italy	2000	1	0	0	1
50	Santiago Botero	Colombia	2000	0	1	0	1
50	Julio Alberto Pérez	Mexico	2002	1	0	0	1
50	Aitor Osa	Spain	2002	0	0	1	1
50	Fabian Wegmann	Germany	2004	1	0	0	1
50	José Rujano	Venezuela	2005	1	0	0	1
50	Joaquim Rodríguez	Spain	2005	0	0	1	1
50	Juan Manuel Gárate	Spain	2006	1	0	0	1
50	Leonardo Piepoli	Italy	2007	1	0	0	1
50	Mauricio Soler	Colombia	2007	0	1	0	1
50	Denis Menchov	Russia	2007	0	0	1	1
50	Emanuele Sella	Italy	2008	1	0	0	1
50	Matthew Lloyd	Australia	2010	1	0	0	1
50	Anthony Charteau	France	2010	0	1	0	1
50	Samuel Sánchez	Spain	2011	0	1	0	1
50	Matteo Rabottini	Italy	2012	1	0	0	1
50	Thomas Voeckler	France	2012	0	1	0	1
50	**Simon Clarke**	Australia	2012	0	0	1	1
50	**Stefano Pirazzi**	Italy	2013	1	0	0	1
50	**Nairo Quintana**	Colombia	2013	0	1	0	1
50	**Nicolas Edet**	France	2013	0	0	1	1
50	Julián Arredondo	Colombia	2014	1	0	0	1
50	Luis León Sánchez	Spain	2014	0	0	1	1
50	Giovanni Visconti	Italy	2015	1	0	0	1
50	Mikel Nieve	Spain	2016	1	0	0	1
50	**Mikel Landa**	Spain	2017	1	0	0	1
50	**Warren Barguil**	France	2017	0	1	0	1
50	Davide Villella	Italy	2017	0	0	1	1
50	**Julian Alaphilippe**	France	2018	0	1	0	1
50	**Thomas De Gendt**	Belgium	2018	0	0	1	1
50	**Romain Bardet**	France	2019	0	1	0	1
50	**Ruben Guerreiro**	Portugal	2020	1	0	0	1
50	**Guillaume Martin**	France	2020	0	0	1	1
50	**Michael Storer**	Australia	2021	0	0	1	1
50	**Koen Bouwman**	Netherlands	2022	1	0	0	1
50	**Jonas Vingegaard**	Denmark	2022	0	1	0	1
50	Thibaut Pinot	France	2023	1	0	0	1
50	**Remco Evenepoel**	Belgium	2023	0	0	1	1
50	**Lorenzo Fortunato**	Italy	2025	1	0	0	1
50	**Santiago Buitrago**	Colombia	2026	0	0	1	1

=== By country ===
Grand Tour mountains classification winners by country
Country	Giro	Tour	Vuelta	Total
Spain	17	18	50	85
Italy	41	13	4	58
France	6	23	9	38
Belgium	6	11	2	19
Colombia	6	5	7	18
Switzerland	3	1	2	6
Australia	1	0	4	5
Luxembourg	2	2	0	4
United Kingdom	2	2	0	4
Netherlands	1	2	1	4
Slovenia	1	3	0	4
Denmark	0	3	0	3
Ecuador	0	2	1	3
Poland	0	2	0	2
United States	1	0	0	1
Mexico	1	0	0	1
Germany	1	0	0	1
Venezuela	1	0	0	1
Russia	0	0	1	1
Portugal	1	0	0	1

== See also ==
- Climbing specialist
- Mountains classification in the Tour de France
- Mountains classification in the Giro d'Italia
- Mountains classification in the Vuelta a España
