= Mur de Péguère =

Mountain pass in the French Pyrenees

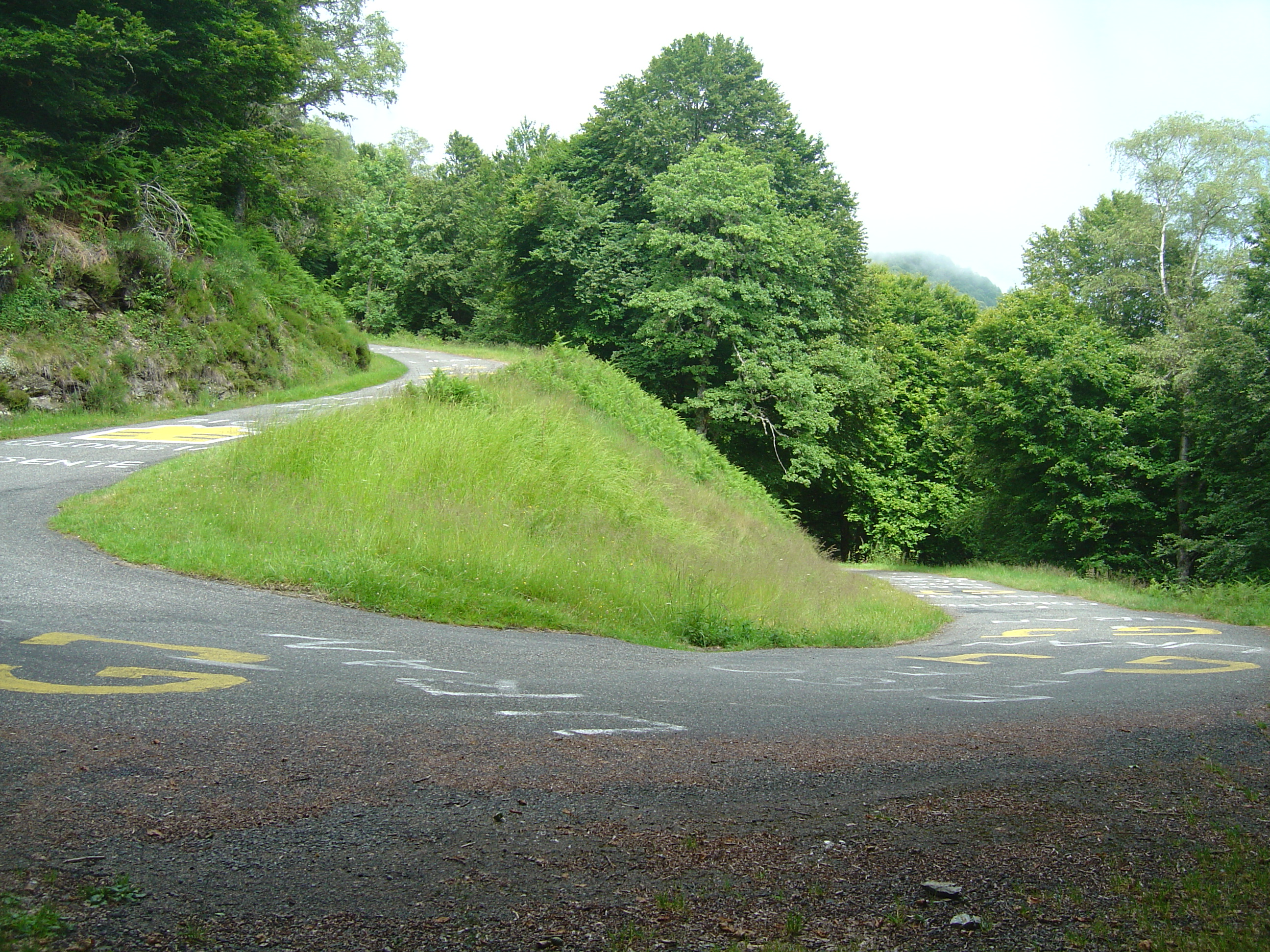

- Location within Pyrenees
- Elevation: 1,375 metres (4,511 ft)
- Traversed by: D17

Third Approach
- Location: Ariège, France
- Range: Pyrenees
- Coordinates: 42°55′06″N 1°23′21″E

The Mur de Péguère (also known as the Col de Péguère) (elevation 1,375 m (4,511 ft)) is a mountain pass in the French Pyrenees in the department of Ariège, between the communities of Massat (south) and Sentenac-de-Sérou (north).

== Details of climb ==
From Massat, the climb initially follows the D618 towards the Col de Port before turning onto the D17 just after the Col des Caougnous. The total ascent is 9.8 km (6.1 mi) long, with a height gained of 726 m (2,382 ft) at an average gradient of 7.4%, with the section after the Col des Caougnous having stretches in excess of 18%.

From the Foix direction, the ascent starts at La Mouline (Serres-sur-Arget) from where the climb is 18 km (11 mi), gaining 872 m (2,861 ft), in height at an average gradient of 4.8%. The col can also be reached on the descent from the Col de Portel.

== Tour de France ==
The pass was crossed in Stage 14 of the 2012 Tour de France from the Massat direction. The leader over the summit was French rider, Sandy Casar, although the stage was marred when tacks were thrown onto the road at the summit of the climb, causing as many as thirty riders to puncture.

In 1973, the summit was scheduled to be climbed from the Foix direction, but the riders protested that the descent towards the D618 was too dangerous, so the route was amended. Since 1973, the road has been resurfaced.

The col was also crossed on Stage 11 in 2008, on the descent from the Col de Portel, but was not categorised.

Year	Stage	Category	Start	Finish	Leader at the summit
2022	16	1	Carcassonne	Foix	Hugo Houle (CAN)
2019	15	1	Limoux	Foix Prat d'Albis	Simon Geschke (GER)
2017	13	1	Saint-Girons	Foix	Warren Barguil (FRA)
2012	14	1	Limoux	Foix	Sandy Casar (FRA)
