= 2022 Tour de France, Stage 12 to Stage 21 =

The 2022 Tour de France is the 109th edition of the Tour de France. It started in Copenhagen, Denmark on 1 July and ended with the final stage at Champs-Élysées, Paris on 24 July.

== Classification standings ==
Legend
Denotes the leader of the general classification	Denotes the leader of the mountains classification
Denotes the leader of the points classification	Denotes the leader of the young rider classification
Denotes the leader of the team classification	Denotes the winner of the combativity award

== Stage 12 ==
14 July 2022 – Briançon to Alpe d'Huez, 165.5 km (102.8 mi)

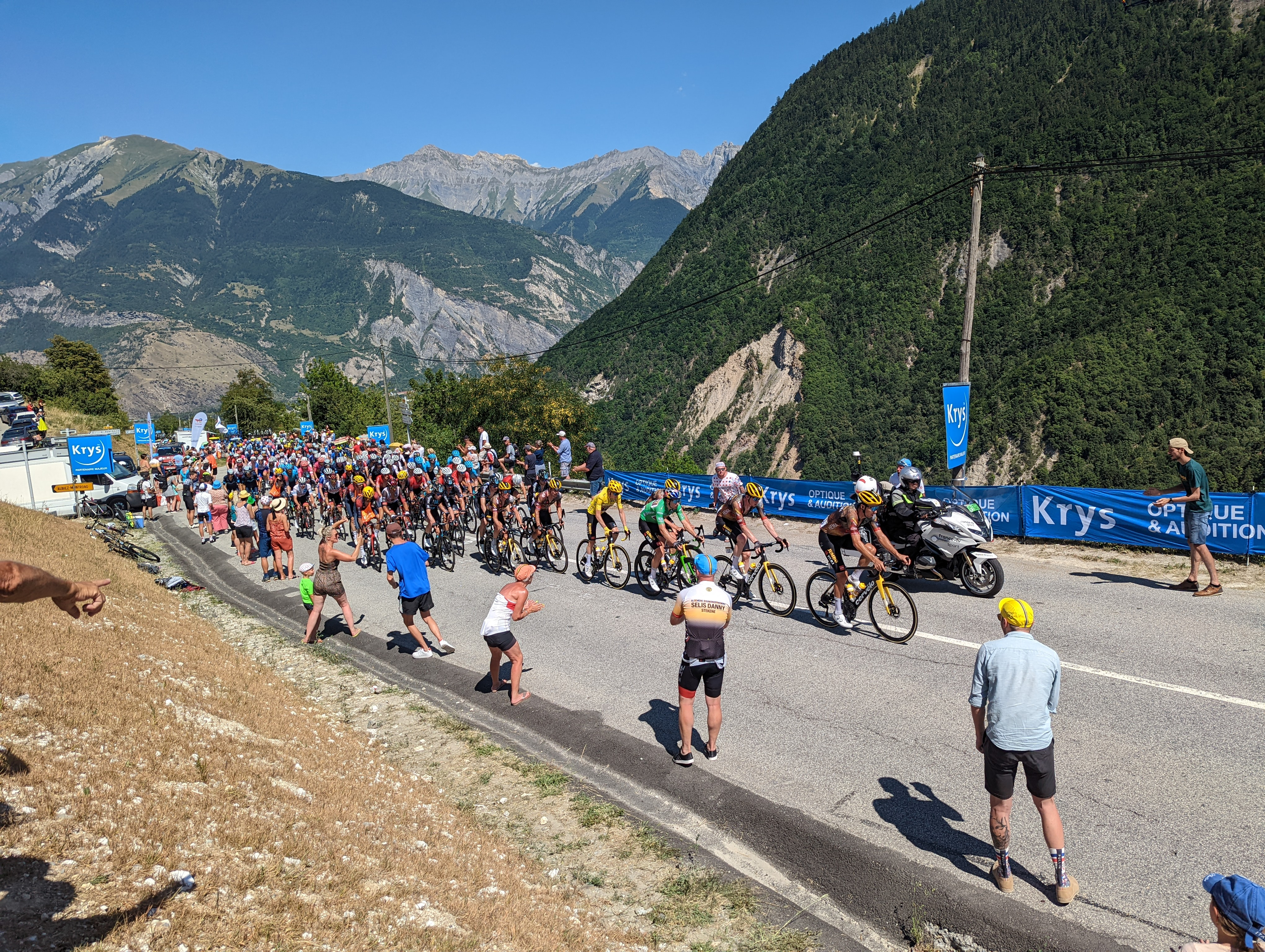
Peloton on the Col de la Croix de Fer

The twelfth stage featured the race's queen stage as the riders travelled from Briançon to Alpe d'Huez. The riders gradually climbed from the get-go, passing through the intermediate sprint in Le Monêtier-les-Bains after 11.8 kilometres (7.3 mi). Immediately afterwards, the riders made their way back up the Col du Galibier but this time, the riders went up the hors categorie Col du Lautaret side, which is 23 kilometres (14 mi) long with an average of 5.1 percent. After descending the Galibier and the Télégraphe, the riders made their way towards the hors categorie Col de la Croix de Fer, a 29-kilometre (18 mi) climb with an average of 5.2 percent. Despite the average gradient, the climb had two short descents while the last 6.5 kilometres (4.0 mi) averaged 8.3 percent. At the top, there were 54.5 kilometres (33.9 mi) left on the stage. Following a step descent and a flat section, the riders reached the foot of the hors categorie Alpe d'Huez for another summit finish. The climb is 13.8 kilometres (8.6 mi) long with an average of 8.1 percent. The first 11 kilometres (6.8 mi) of the climb averaged almost 9 percent before easing to around 5 percent near the summit. All in all, the stage had a total of 4,630 metres (15,190 ft) of vertical climbing.

As soon as the stage started, Neilson Powless (EF Education–EasyPost) attacked out of the peloton. He was soon joined by five other riders as the peloton allowed the break to gain two minutes. On the climb of Col du Galibier, attacks flew out of the peloton as several riders tried to bridge to the break. Four riders, Giulio Ciccone (Trek–Segafredo), Louis Meintjes (Intermarché–Wanty–Gobert Matériaux), Tom Pidcock (INEOS Grenadiers), and Chris Froome (Israel–Premier Tech), eventually managed to break away from the peloton as Team Jumbo–Visma began to set a steady tempo in the peloton. Meanwhile, up front, Anthony Perez (Cofidis) left his breakaway companions to take the maximum KoM points at the top of the Galibier. On the descent, Powless, Ciccone, and Meintjes bridged up to Perez to form the lead group. Sebastian Schönberger (B&B Hotels–KTM), Kobe Goossens (Intermarché–Wanty–Gobert Matériaux), Nelson Oliveira (Movistar Team), Pidcock, and Froome soon made their way to the front group to establish the break of nine riders. The group extended their lead to seven and a half minutes over the peloton before Team Jumbo–Visma lifted the pace on Col de la Croix de Fer. On the way to the top of the climb, Oliveira, Goossens, Schönberger, and Perez were dropped from the break, with the lead quintet crossing the top of Croix de Fer at almost four and a half minutes before the peloton did so.

On the descent, the peloton eased the pace, allowing the break to extend their advantage to six and a half minutes before they reached the climb of Alpe d'Huez. With around 10.6 kilometres (6.6 mi) left, Pidcock attacked from the break. Initially, Meintjes, as well as Froome a few seconds behind him, set a steady tempo to keep Pidcock at less than ten seconds ahead but Pidcock gradually extended his lead all the way to the top. He soloed to the top to take his first World Tour win and he also became the youngest rider to win on Alpe d'Huez. Meintjes took second, 48 seconds down, while Froome finished third at over two minutes behind. Meanwhile, in the peloton, Team Jumbo–Visma increased the pace on the climb. The GC contenders began to drop from the group until only the maillot jaune, Jonas Vingegaard (Team Jumbo–Visma), his teammate, Sepp Kuss, Tadej Pogačar (UAE Team Emirates), Geraint Thomas (INEOS Grenadiers), and Enric Mas (Movistar Team) remained. Towards the top, Pogačar attacked twice and only Vingegaard was able to follow him both times. Pogačar and Vingegaard eventually slowed near the finish, allowing Thomas, Kuss, and Mas to come back to them. At the finish, Pogačar sprinted for time gaps but there were no gaps between him, Vingegaard, and Thomas.

In the GC, Vingegaard kept the maillot jaune, 2' 22" ahead of Pogačar, who moved up to second, while Thomas rose to third, a further four seconds behind. Romain Bardet (Team DSM) dropped to fourth after losing 19 seconds. Adam Yates (INEOS Grenadiers), Nairo Quintana (Arkéa–Samsic), and David Gaudu (Groupama–FDJ) occupy fifth to seventh after having lost between 38 seconds to 1' 21". Pidcock returned to the top ten with his stage win and time gains on the stage.

Stage 12 Result
Rank	Rider	Team	Time
1	Tom Pidcock (GBR)	INEOS Grenadiers	4h 55' 24"
2	Louis Meintjes (RSA)	Intermarché–Wanty–Gobert Matériaux	+ 48"
3	Chris Froome (GBR)	Israel–Premier Tech	+ 2' 06"
4	Neilson Powless (USA)	EF Education–EasyPost	+ 2' 29"
5	Tadej Pogačar (SLO)	UAE Team Emirates	+ 3' 23"
6	Jonas Vingegaard (DEN)	Team Jumbo–Visma	+ 3' 23"
7	Geraint Thomas (GBR)	INEOS Grenadiers	+ 3' 23"
8	Enric Mas (ESP)	Movistar Team	+ 3' 26"
9	Sepp Kuss (USA)	Team Jumbo–Visma	+ 3' 26"
10	Giulio Ciccone (ITA)	Trek–Segafredo	+ 3' 32"

General classification after Stage 12
Rank	Rider	Team	Time
1	Jonas Vingegaard (DEN)	Team Jumbo–Visma	46h 28' 46"
2	Tadej Pogačar (SLO)	UAE Team Emirates	+ 2' 22"
3	Geraint Thomas (GBR)	INEOS Grenadiers	+ 2' 26"
4	Romain Bardet (FRA)	Team DSM	+ 2' 35"
5	Adam Yates (GBR)	INEOS Grenadiers	+ 3' 44"
6	Nairo Quintana (COL)	Arkéa–Samsic	+ 3' 58"
7	David Gaudu (FRA)	Groupama–FDJ	+ 4' 07"
8	Tom Pidcock (GBR)	INEOS Grenadiers	+ 7' 39"
9	Enric Mas (ESP)	Movistar Team	+ 9' 32"
10	Aleksandr Vlasov	Bora–Hansgrohe	+ 10' 06"

== Stage 13 ==
15 July 2022 – Le Bourg-d'Oisans to Saint-Étienne, 193 km (120 mi)

the 13th stage of the 2022 Tour de France took the Chemin des Aqueducs into Vienne just before crossing the Rhône and beginning the climb of Côte Saint-Romain-en-Gal

The thirteenth stage featured a transition stage that took the riders from Le Bourg-d'Oisans to Saint-Étienne. From the start, the riders gradually descended towards the third-category Côte de Brié. Following the descent and a long flat section, the riders tackled the second-category Col de Parménie. Another descent and a short flat section led to the intermediate sprint in La Côte-Saint-André with 91 kilometres (57 mi) left. Following a gradual descent, the riders climbed up the final categorised climb of the day, the third-category Côte de Saint-Romain-en-Gal, which was crested with 44 kilometres (27 mi) to go. Near the finish, there was an uncategorised climb that peaked with 7.6 kilometres (4.7 mi) remaining. After cresting the top, the riders rode on a plateau section that led to the finish in Saint-Étienne.

There was a furious fight for the break as several riders attempted to go in the move. It took until the climb of Côte de Brié before a trio of riders, Filippo Ganna (INEOS Grenadiers), Stefan Küng (Groupama–FDJ), and Matteo Jorgenson (Movistar Team), built a gap over the peloton. Behind them, a group of 19 riders tried to bridge up to the trio but they were brought back by the Alpecin–Deceuninck-led peloton. Eventually, Hugo Houle (Israel–Premier Tech), Fred Wright (Team Bahrain Victorious), and the Trek–Segafredo duo of Mads Pedersen and Quinn Simmons escaped from the peloton and bridged up to the trio up front. The break of seven built a lead of around two and a half minutes as the sprinters' teams kept them in check. At the intermediate sprint, after the break took maximum points, Wout van Aert (Team Jumbo–Visma) led the peloton across to increase his lead in the points classification. With around 71 kilometres (44 mi) left, there was a crash that involved Caleb Ewan (Lotto–Soudal), hurting his knee in the process, but he continued the race. Ahead of the Côte de Saint-Romain-en-Gal, the gap started to come down to the break.

On the climb, several sprinters began to drop, forcing the sprinters' teams to get off the front of the peloton. As the pace eased, the break's lead increased towards three and a half minutes. With 46 kilometres (29 mi) remaining, Simmons dropped out of the break after finishing his work for Pedersen. Eventually, Team BikeExchange–Jayco took up the chase in the peloton. They quickly decreased the break's advantage to two and a half minutes before the gap stabilised. The lead remained at less than two and a half minutes before Team BikeExchange–Jayco called off the chase. Up front, the break continued to work well together until Pedersen launched an attack with 10.6 kilometres (6.6 mi) to go. Only Wright and Houle were able to follow him, with the gap over Ganna, Küng, and Jorgenson gradually increasing towards the finish. Wright and Houle attempted to attack Pedersen in the final kilometres, but the Dane was able to respond each time. The lead trio came to the finish together, with Pedersen launching his sprint with 250 metres (820 ft) to go. Wright and Houle never came close as Pedersen won his first Grand Tour stage. The chasing trio finished half a minute down while van Aert led the peloton across almost six minutes down. There were no changes in the top ten as Jonas Vingegaard (Team Jumbo–Visma) kept the maillot jaune.

Stage 13 Result
Rank	Rider	Team	Time
1	Mads Pedersen (DEN)	Trek–Segafredo	4h 13' 03"
2	Fred Wright (GBR)	Team Bahrain Victorious	+ 0"
3	Hugo Houle (CAN)	Israel–Premier Tech	+ 0"
4	Stefan Küng (SUI)	Groupama–FDJ	+ 30"
5	Matteo Jorgenson (USA)	Movistar Team	+ 30"
6	Filippo Ganna (ITA)	INEOS Grenadiers	+ 32"
7	Wout van Aert (BEL)	Team Jumbo–Visma	+ 5' 45"
8	Florian Sénéchal (FRA)	Quick-Step Alpha Vinyl Team	+ 5' 45"
9	Luca Mozzato (ITA)	B&B Hotels–KTM	+ 5' 45"
10	Andrea Pasqualon (ITA)	Intermarché–Wanty–Gobert Matériaux	+ 5' 45"

General classification after Stage 13
Rank	Rider	Team	Time
1	Jonas Vingegaard (DEN)	Team Jumbo–Visma	50h 47' 34"
2	Tadej Pogačar (SLO)	UAE Team Emirates	+ 2' 22"
3	Geraint Thomas (GBR)	INEOS Grenadiers	+ 2' 26"
4	Romain Bardet (FRA)	Team DSM	+ 2' 35"
5	Adam Yates (GBR)	INEOS Grenadiers	+ 3' 44"
6	Nairo Quintana (COL)	Arkéa–Samsic	+ 3' 58"
7	David Gaudu (FRA)	Groupama–FDJ	+ 4' 07"
8	Tom Pidcock (GBR)	INEOS Grenadiers	+ 7' 39"
9	Enric Mas (ESP)	Movistar Team	+ 9' 32"
10	Aleksandr Vlasov	Bora–Hansgrohe	+ 10' 06"

== Stage 14 ==
16 July 2022 – Saint-Étienne to Mende, 192.5 km (119.6 mi)

The fourteenth stage featured another hilly stage that took the riders from Saint-Étienne to Mende. The first 66.1 kilometres (41.1 mi) had an undulating terrain, with the riders tackling the third-category climbs of Côte de Saint-Just-Malmont and Côte de Châtaignier in the first 40 kilometres (25 mi) as well as the intermediate sprint in Yssingeaux after 50.7 kilometres (31.5 mi) of racing. Following a short flat section, the riders went up an uncategorised climb before tackling the third-category Côte de Grandrieu. Afterwards, the riders rode on a plateau section before going up the third-category Côte de la Fage, which was crested with 30.4 kilometres (18.9 mi) left. Following a long descent, the riders tackled the final categorised climb, the second-category Côte de la Croix Neuve Montée Jalabert, which is 3 kilometres (1.9 mi) long with an average of 10.2 percent. After cresting the top, there were 1.5 kilometres (0.93 mi) left until the finish at the Mende Airfield.

With the high likelihood of a breakaway challenging for the stage win, several riders attempted to make it into the break. With around 180 kilometres (110 mi) still to go, on the Côte de Saint-Just-Malmont, Tadej Pogačar (UAE Team Emirates) attacked twice but the maillot jaune, Jonas Vingegaard (Team Jumbo–Visma), was able to respond both times. The breakaway fight continued on until the riders reached the Côte de Châtaignier with around 153 kilometres (95 mi) left when a group of 23 riders broke away from the peloton. Team Jumbo–Visma proceeded to block the road and allowed the break to extend their advantage to more than 14 minutes, ensuring that the break will fight for the stage win. The break continued to work well together until Michael Matthews (Team BikeExchange–Jayco) attacked with 53.8 kilometres (33.4 mi) remaining. He built a gap over his breakaway companions, who began to attack each other as several riders tried to bridge up to Matthews. Eventually, Andreas Kron (Lotto–Soudal), Luis León Sánchez (Team Bahrain Victorious), and Felix Großschartner (Bora–Hansgrohe) caught up to Matthews with 43 kilometres (27 mi) left. They gradually increased their lead over the chasing group, which began to split on the Côte de la Fage. The chasers struggled to work together as the lead group stabilised their gap at around half a minute.

On the descent of Côte de la Fage, Kron suffered a puncture, dropping himself from the lead group to the chase group. With the lack of cooperation in the chase group, the lead trio extended their lead to around 40 seconds ahead of the final climb of Côte de la Croix Neuve Montée Jalabert. On the climb, Matthews dropped Sánchez and Großschartner in pursuit of the stage win. In the chase group, Alberto Bettiol (EF Education–EasyPost) attacked, passing Sánchez and Großschartner before eventually catching up to Matthews. He managed to gap Matthews but the Australian gauged his effort before bridging up to Bettiol. Matthews attacked near the top, with no response from Bettiol. Matthews gradually increased his lead towards the finish to win the stage. Bettiol finished 15 seconds down while Thibaut Pinot (Groupama–FDJ), who made a late attack on the climb, crossed the line 34 seconds down.

Meanwhile, in the peloton, Team Jumbo–Visma increased the pace on Côte de la Fage to reduce the group. As they began the climb of Croix Neuve, UAE Team Emirates came to the front to set up Pogačar. Towards the top, Pogačar launched his attack, with Vingegaard immediately on his wheel. Pogačar kept his pace as they increased their lead over the other contenders. Both riders came to the finish together, 17 seconds ahead of David Gaudu (Groupama–FDJ), Nairo Quintana (Arkéa–Samsic), and Geraint Thomas (INEOS Grenadiers). The other contenders lost somewhere between 22 seconds and 1' 10". In the GC, Vingegaard kept a 2' 22" advantage over Pogačar, with both riders increasing their lead over the rest of the contenders. Louis Meintjes (Intermarché–Wanty–Gobert Matériaux) entered the top ten after gaining 11 minutes from the breakaway.

Stage 14 Result
Rank	Rider	Team	Time
1	Michael Matthews (AUS)	Team BikeExchange–Jayco	4h 30' 53"
2	Alberto Bettiol (ITA)	EF Education–EasyPost	+ 15"
3	Thibaut Pinot (FRA)	Groupama–FDJ	+ 34"
4	Marc Soler (ESP)	UAE Team Emirates	+ 50"
5	Patrick Konrad (AUT)	Bora–Hansgrohe	+ 58"
6	Jakob Fuglsang (DEN)	Israel–Premier Tech	+ 58"
7	Felix Großschartner (AUT)	Bora–Hansgrohe	+ 1' 06"
8	Lennard Kämna (GER)	Bora–Hansgrohe	+ 1' 12"
9	Simon Geschke (GER)	Cofidis	+ 1' 12"
10	Louis Meintjes (RSA)	Intermarché–Wanty–Gobert Matériaux	+ 1' 12"

General classification after Stage 14
Rank	Rider	Team	Time
1	Jonas Vingegaard (DEN)	Team Jumbo–Visma	55h 31' 01"
2	Tadej Pogačar (SLO)	UAE Team Emirates	+ 2' 22"
3	Geraint Thomas (GBR)	INEOS Grenadiers	+ 2' 43"
4	Romain Bardet (FRA)	Team DSM	+ 3' 01"
5	Adam Yates (GBR)	INEOS Grenadiers	+ 4' 06"
6	Nairo Quintana (COL)	Arkéa–Samsic	+ 4' 15"
7	Louis Meintjes (RSA)	Intermarché–Wanty–Gobert Matériaux	+ 4' 24"
8	David Gaudu (FRA)	Groupama–FDJ	+ 4' 24"
9	Tom Pidcock (GBR)	INEOS Grenadiers	+ 8' 49"
10	Enric Mas (ESP)	Movistar Team	+ 9' 58"

== Stage 15 ==
17 July 2022 – Rodez to Carcassonne, 202.5 km (125.8 mi)

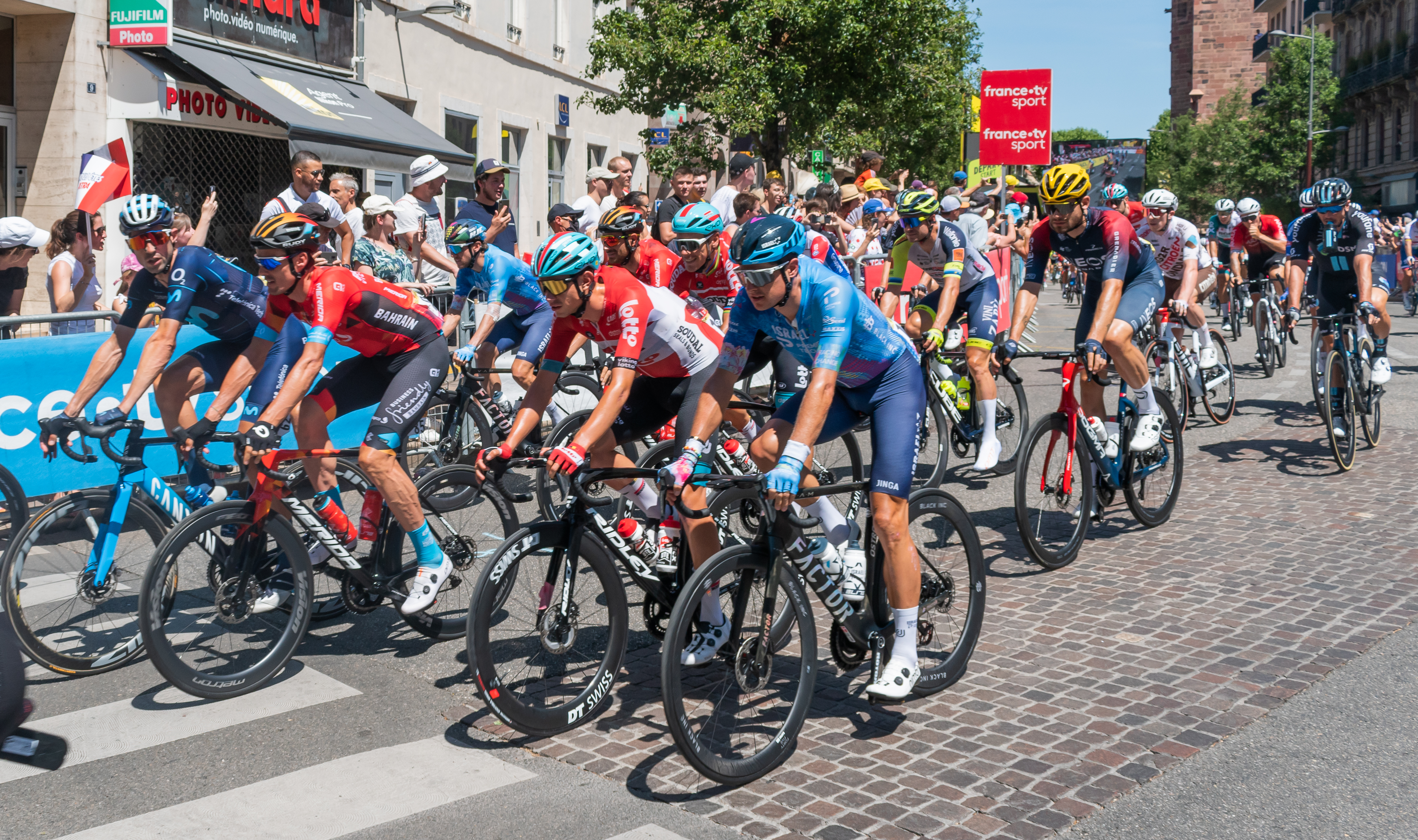
Peloton in Rodez at the start of stage 15

The fifteenth stage featured a flat stage, with the riders travelling from Rodez to Carcassonne. Despite the stage being categorised as a flat stage, the terrain on the stage is undulating with several lumps scattered throughout the day. After 64 kilometres (40 mi) of rolling terrain, the riders tackled the third-category Côte d'Ambialet. After a long section of undulating terrain, the riders reached the intermediate sprint in Saint-Ferréol with 55.5 kilometres (34.5 mi) left. Immediately afterwards, the riders went up the third-category Côte des Cammazes, which was crested with 47.9 kilometres (29.8 mi) remaining. Following the climb, the riders faced another section of rolling terrain before tackling a flat section towards the finish in Carcassonne.

At the start of the stage, three riders managed to escape from the peloton: Wout van Aert (Team Jumbo–Visma), Nils Politt (Bora–Hansgrohe), and Mikkel Honoré (Quick-Step Alpha Vinyl Team). The trio got a lead of two minutes and although several riders tried to bridge up to them, the lead group maintained their lead at over a minute. With around 161 kilometres (100 mi) to go, van Aert sat up from the break, leaving Politt and Honoré out front. The duo's lead stabilised at around two minutes as the sprinters' teams took up the chase in the peloton. 64 kilometres (40 mi) from the finish, Steven Kruijswijk (Team Jumbo–Visma) and van Aert crashed in the peloton. Although van Aert was able to get back on his bike, Kruijswijk had a dislocated shoulder and he had to abandon the race. It was the team's second abandonment on the day as Primož Roglič did not start the stage. A few kilometres later, there was another crash involving Team Jumbo–Visma as the race leader, Jonas Vingegaard, and Tiesj Benoot went down; both riders would continue the race. On the climb of Côte des Cammazes, Trek–Segafredo began to increase the pace, catching Politt and Honoré and dropping sprinters such as Fabio Jakobsen (Quick-Step Alpha Vinyl Team), Caleb Ewan (Lotto–Soudal), and Dylan Groenewegen (Team BikeExchange–Jayco). Near the top of the climb, Benjamin Thomas (Cofidis) and Alexis Gougeard (B&B Hotels–KTM) attacked from the peloton.

Although Groenewegen was more than a minute behind the peloton at one point, Team BikeExchange–Jayco managed to close the gap and caught up with the peloton with 26 kilometres (16 mi) to go. Up front, Thomas and Gougeard maintained their lead at around half a minute over the peloton. With around 4.5 kilometres (2.8 mi) left, Gougeard was dropped by Thomas, who pushed on alone. Thomas continued in the lead until he was caught by the peloton inside the final kilometre. Trek–Segafredo led out the sprint, with Mads Pedersen launching with 250 metres (820 ft) left. Van Aert came around him but Jasper Philipsen (Alpecin–Deceuninck) passed his compatriot to win his first Tour stage. All of the main contenders finished safely in the peloton as Vingegaard kept the maillot jaune ahead of the last rest day.

Stage 15 Result
Rank	Rider	Team	Time
1	Jasper Philipsen (BEL)	Alpecin–Deceuninck	4h 27' 27"
2	Wout van Aert (BEL)	Team Jumbo–Visma	+ 0"
3	Mads Pedersen (DEN)	Trek–Segafredo	+ 0"
4	Peter Sagan (SVK)	Team TotalEnergies	+ 0"
5	Danny van Poppel (NED)	Bora–Hansgrohe	+ 0"
6	Dylan Groenewegen (NED)	Team BikeExchange–Jayco	+ 0"
7	Florian Sénéchal (FRA)	Quick-Step Alpha Vinyl Team	+ 0"
8	Luca Mozzato (ITA)	B&B Hotels–KTM	+ 0"
9	Andrea Pasqualon (ITA)	Intermarché–Wanty–Gobert Matériaux	+ 0"
10	Fred Wright (GBR)	Team Bahrain Victorious	+ 0"

General classification after Stage 15
Rank	Rider	Team	Time
1	Jonas Vingegaard (DEN)	Team Jumbo–Visma	59h 58' 28"
2	Tadej Pogačar (SLO)	UAE Team Emirates	+ 2' 22"
3	Geraint Thomas (GBR)	INEOS Grenadiers	+ 2' 43"
4	Romain Bardet (FRA)	Team DSM	+ 3' 01"
5	Adam Yates (GBR)	INEOS Grenadiers	+ 4' 06"
6	Nairo Quintana (COL)	Arkéa–Samsic	+ 4' 15"
7	Louis Meintjes (RSA)	Intermarché–Wanty–Gobert Matériaux	+ 4' 24"
8	David Gaudu (FRA)	Groupama–FDJ	+ 4' 24"
9	Tom Pidcock (GBR)	INEOS Grenadiers	+ 8' 49"
10	Enric Mas (ESP)	Movistar Team	+ 9' 58"

== Rest day 2 ==
18 July 2022 – Carcassonne

== Stage 16 ==
19 July 2022 – Carcassonne to Foix, 178.5 km (110.9 mi)

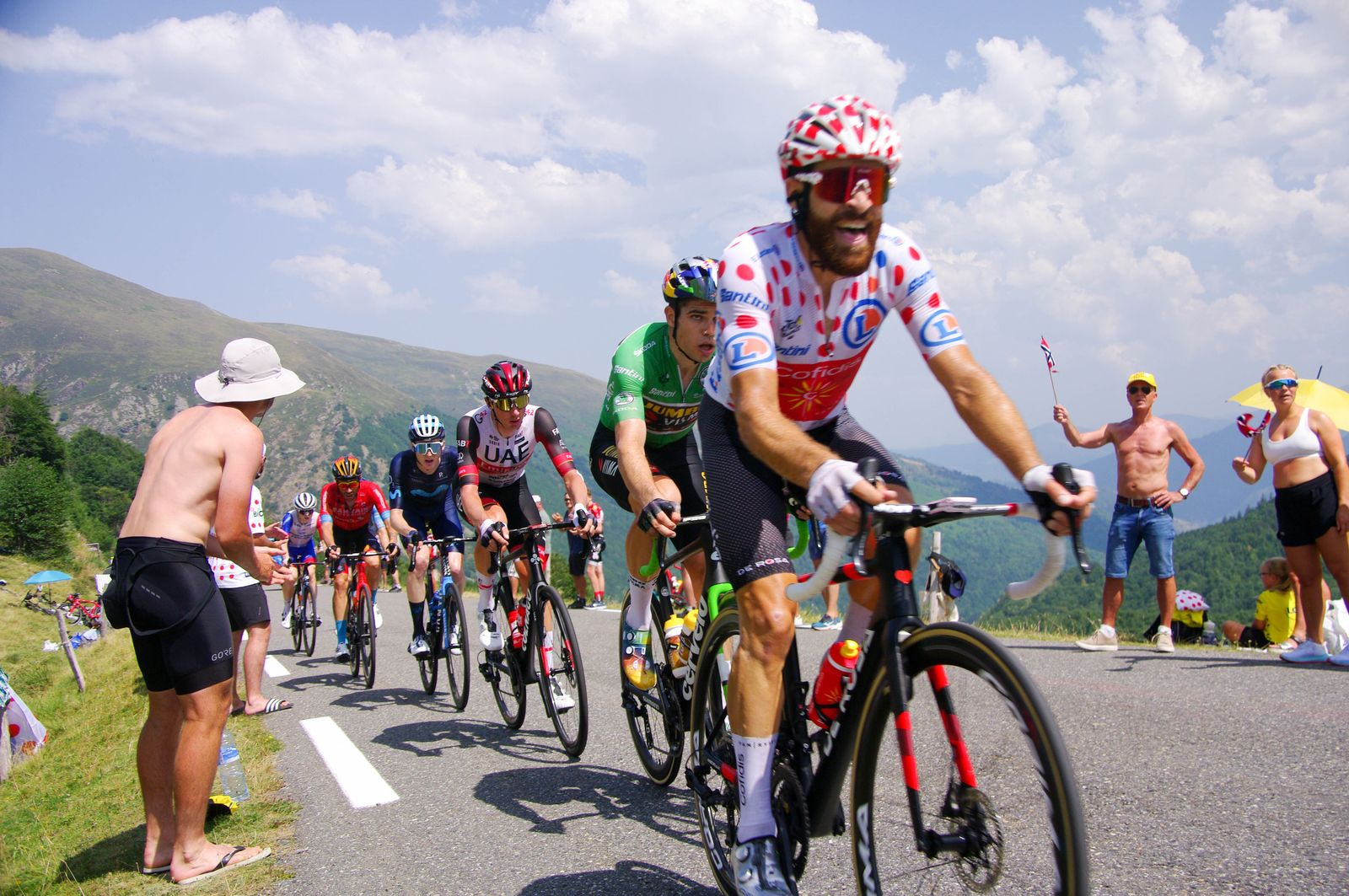
Simon Geschke (Cofidis) wearing the polka dot jersey as leader of the Mountains classification

Following the last rest day, the riders headed towards the Pyrenees as the riders travelled from Carcassonne to Foix for another hilly stage. In the first 43.1 kilometres (26.8 mi), the riders tackled the fourth-category Côte de Saint-Hilaire, the third-category Col de l'Espinas, and the uncategorised climb of Col du Bac. After a short descent, the riders faced a 65.3-kilometre (40.6 mi) flat section, passing through the intermediate sprint in Lavelanet with 110.7 kilometres (68.8 mi) left. Following the long flat section, the riders went up the first-category Port de Lers, an 11.4-kilometre (7.1 mi) climb with an average of 7 percent. The descent immediately led to the foot of the final climb of the day, the first-category Mur de Péguère, which is 9.3 kilometres (5.8 mi) long with an average of 7.9 percent, with the last 3.5 kilometres (2.2 mi) of the climb averaging 11.5 percent. The climb was crested with 27.2 kilometres (16.9 mi) remaining. The descent and a short flat section took the riders to the finish in Foix.

A few kilometres following the stage's official start, a large 29-man group broke away from the peloton. The best-placed man in the break was Aleksandr Vlasov (Bora–Hansgrohe), eleventh on GC at just over ten and a half minutes down on Jonas Vingegaard (Team Jumbo–Visma). The peloton allowed the break to extend their advantage to around six and a half minutes before Team Jumbo–Visma began to control the gap. At the first climb of the day, the Côte de Saint-Hilaire, Alexis Gougeard (B&B Hotels–KTM), Mathieu Burgaudeau (Team TotalEnergies), and Matteo Jorgenson (Movistar Team) managed to split themselves from the break. They led by as much as a minute over the chase group but Burgaudeau and Jorgenson soon dropped back to the chase group while Gougeard was eventually swallowed back with 127 kilometres (79 mi) left. The break soon extended their lead to over eight minutes as they neared the climb of Port de Lers. Just before the climb, Stefan Bissegger (EF Education–EasyPost) attacked from the break but he was not able to get a big gap. On the lower slopes of the climb, Damiano Caruso (Team Bahrain Victorious) and Olivier Le Gac (Groupama–FDJ) got a gap in the break, which began to split on the climb.

As the break went up the climb, Caruso dropped Le Gac out front while a group of chasers began to close the gap to the front. Michael Storer (Groupama–FDJ) and Michael Woods (Israel–Premier Tech) soon caught up with Caruso but at the top, seven chasers caught up with the lead trio, with Simon Geschke (Cofidis) taking maximum KoM points to extend his lead in the KoM classification. On the descent of Port de Lers, with 38 kilometres (24 mi) to go, Hugo Houle (Israel–Premier Tech) attacked from the front group. He gradually increased his lead to half a minute on the chasers, which only consisted of Jorgenson and Houle's teammate, Woods, at the top of the climb. On the final descent, Jorgenson crashed on a turn. Although he managed to come back to Woods, Houle's advantage at this point had increased to a minute. Houle maintained his lead all the way to the line to win his first Grand Tour stage.

In the GC group, Team Jumbo–Visma continued to keep a steady pace. On the climb of Port de Lers, Enric Mas (Movistar Team) attacked with two of his teammates, building a gap of a minute over the other contenders. Towards the top, Tadej Pogačar (UAE Team Emirates) attacked thrice, twice on the climb and once on the descent, but Vingegaard was able to get to his wheel each time, with both riders slowing down to allow the favorites group to come back. The accelerations caused Mas to be brought back and caused Romain Bardet (Team DSM) to get into difficulty. On the descent, Bardet was able to come back to the GC group. On Mur de Péguère, Movistar Team set the pace before Rafał Majka (UAE Team Emirates) set a faster tempo, thinning out the group. He continued the pace until his chain broke, prompting Sepp Kuss (Team Jumbo–Visma) to take up the pacemaking. Only Pogačar, Vingegaard, and Nairo Quintana (Arkéa–Samsic) remained with Kuss at the top of the climb. On the descent, Geraint Thomas (INEOS Grenadiers) and David Gaudu (Groupama–FDJ) came back to the maillot jaune group before they reached the finish.

In the GC, Vingegaard kept the maillot jaune with a 2' 22" advantage over Pogačar. Quintana and Gaudu moved up to fourth and fifth, respectively, after not losing time on the day. The INEOS Grenadiers duo of Adam Yates and Tom Pidcock and Louis Meintjes (Intermarché–Wanty–Gobert Matériaux) lost almost a minute and a half while Mas lost almost three minutes. Bardet suffered the biggest time loss amongst the contenders as he finished three and a half minutes down. Meanwhile, Vlasov gained four minutes in the break to enter the top ten.

Stage 16 Result
Rank	Rider	Team	Time
1	Hugo Houle (CAN)	Israel–Premier Tech	4h 23' 47"
2	Valentin Madouas (FRA)	Groupama–FDJ	+ 1' 10"
3	Michael Woods (CAN)	Israel–Premier Tech	+ 1' 10"
4	Matteo Jorgenson (USA)	Movistar Team	+ 1' 12"
5	Michael Storer (AUS)	Groupama–FDJ	+ 1' 25"
6	Aleksandr Vlasov	Bora–Hansgrohe	+ 1' 40"
7	Dylan Teuns (BEL)	Team Bahrain Victorious	+ 1' 40"
8	Simon Geschke (GER)	Cofidis	+ 2' 11"
9	Mathieu Burgaudeau (FRA)	Team TotalEnergies	+ 5' 04"
10	Damiano Caruso (ITA)	Team Bahrain Victorious	+ 5' 04"

General classification after Stage 16
Rank	Rider	Team	Time
1	Jonas Vingegaard (DEN)	Team Jumbo–Visma	64h 28' 09"
2	Tadej Pogačar (SLO)	UAE Team Emirates	+ 2' 22"
3	Geraint Thomas (GBR)	INEOS Grenadiers	+ 2' 43"
4	Nairo Quintana (COL)	Arkéa–Samsic	+ 4' 15"
5	David Gaudu (FRA)	Groupama–FDJ	+ 4' 24"
6	Adam Yates (GBR)	INEOS Grenadiers	+ 5' 28"
7	Louis Meintjes (RSA)	Intermarché–Wanty–Gobert Matériaux	+ 5' 46"
8	Aleksandr Vlasov	Bora–Hansgrohe	+ 6' 18"
9	Romain Bardet (FRA)	Team DSM	+ 6' 37"
10	Tom Pidcock (GBR)	INEOS Grenadiers	+ 10' 11"

== Stage 17 ==
20 July 2022 – Saint-Gaudens to Peyragudes, 130 km (81 mi)

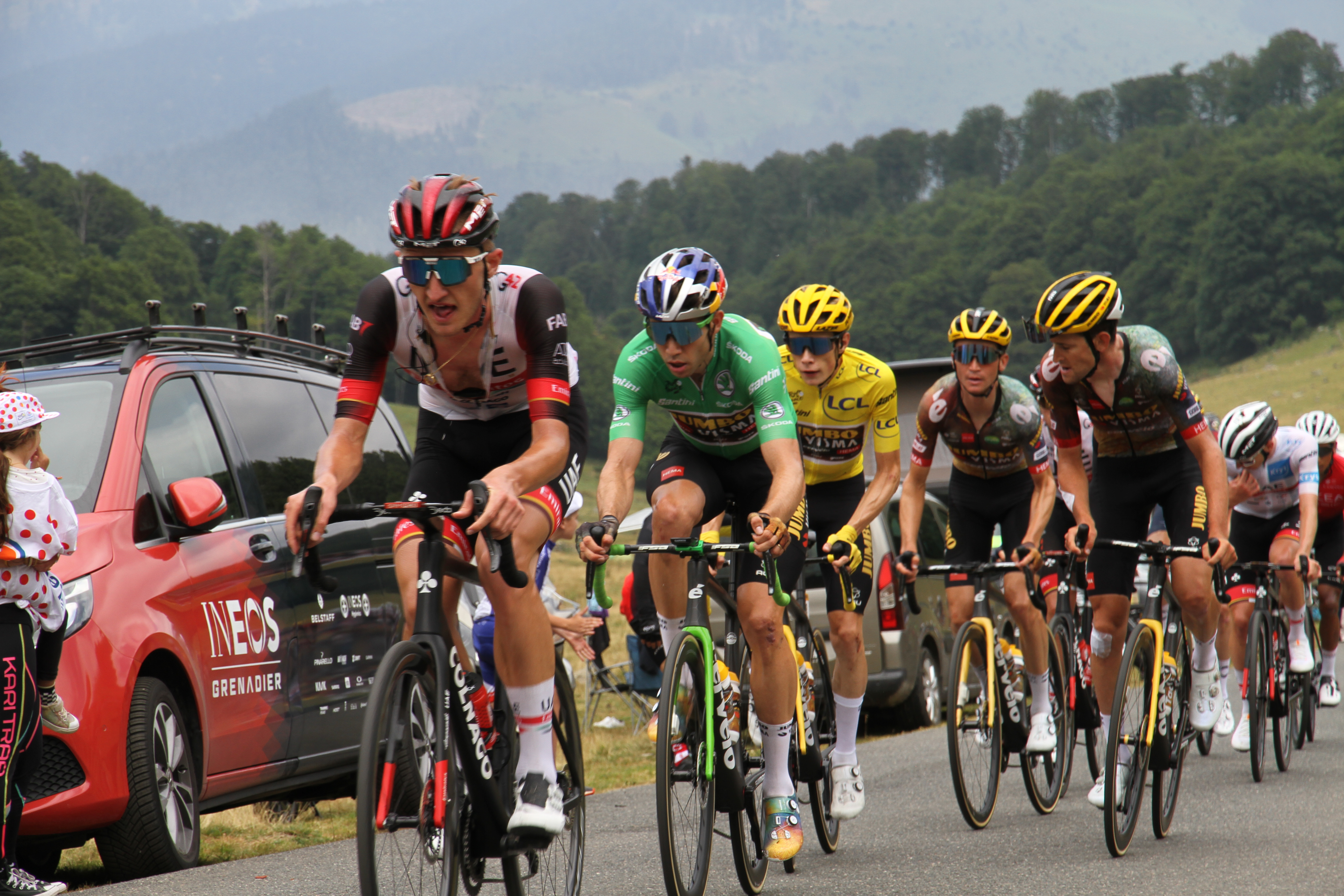
Mikkel Bjerg, Wout van Aert (in green jersey), Jonas Vingegaard (in yellow jersey) and Tadej Pogačar behind (in white jersey)

The seventeenth stage featured the shortest road stage of the Tour and the penultimate mountain stage of the Tour, with the riders travelling from Saint-Gaudens to Peyragudes. The first 53.6 kilometres (33.3 mi) were mostly flat, with the riders passing through the intermediate sprint in La Barthe-de-Neste after 32.9 kilometres (20.4 mi) of racing. After the flat start, the riders headed towards the first-category Col d'Aspin, which is 12 kilometres (7.5 mi) long with an average of 6.5 percent. A short descent to Payolle led to the foot of the second-category Hourquette d'Ancizan, an 8.2-kilometre (5.1 mi) climb with an average of 5.1 percent. Following the descent and a short valley section, the riders went up the first-category Col de Val Louron-Azet, which is 10.7 kilometres (6.6 mi) long with an average of 6.8 percent. The summit was crested with 20.2 kilometres (12.6 mi) left. Another descent and a short valley section led the riders to the foot of the final climb, the first-category climb to Peyragudes. The climb is 8 kilometres (5.0 mi) and averages 7.8 percent, with the climb's toughest gradients located near the top, where the stage finished.

Rafał Majka, a "key lieutenant" of Pogačar did not start stage 17, due to an injury suffered after he threw his chain near the end of stage 16. There was a long breakaway fight as several riders tried to escape from the peloton. As the riders passed through the intermediate sprint, Wout van Aert (Team Jumbo–Visma) took 17 points, mathematically sealing the points classification provided he finished the Tour. It took until the climb of Col d'Aspin before Thibaut Pinot (Groupama–FDJ) and Alexey Lutsenko (Astana Qazaqstan Team) got a significant gap over the peloton. Behind them, a group of 15 chasers escaped from the peloton, which was being controlled by Team Jumbo–Visma. Towards the top, Romain Bardet (Team DSM) attacked from the peloton. He managed to bridge up to the chasing group, which was still around half a minute behind Pinot and Lutsenko. As the riders made their way to Hourquette d'Ancizan, the lead duo maintained their advantage over the chasers while the peloton was two minutes down. On the climb, Mikkel Bjerg (UAE Team Emirates) began to set a faster tempo in the peloton. The main victims of the pace were Adam Yates and Tom Pidcock, two INEOS Grenadiers riders in the top ten, who were dropped and lost almost two minutes on the climb. Towards the top, Pinot and Lutsenko were still in the lead, increasing their gap to almost a minute on the chasing group. Meanwhile, the peloton trailed by less than a minute and a half.

Following the descent, Yates made it back to the peloton. Up front, the lead duo was caught by the chasing group as they started the penultimate climb of Col de Val Louron-Azet. With 27 kilometres (17 mi) to go, Andreas Leknessund (Team DSM) attacked from the break, which began to split into pieces. In the GC group, Bjerg took up the pacemaking again, with his pace dropping Yates once more. After a while, Brandon McNulty (UAE Team Emirates) set the pace once Bjerg was done. His pace allowed the group to pass every remnant of the breakaway while the GC contenders continued to drop throughout the climb. Towards the top, only Tadej Pogačar (UAE Team Emirates) and the maillot jaune, Jonas Vingegaard (Team Jumbo–Visma), were able to stay with McNulty. At the top, Pogačar tried to attack Vingegaard but the Dane was immediately on his wheel. Both riders slowed down on the descent, allowing McNulty to return and set the pace again. Meanwhile, Geraint Thomas (INEOS Grenadiers), Bardet, and Lutsenko were more than a minute down at this point while a group containing the rest of the top ten riders, with the exception of Yates and Pidcock, were more than two minutes behind.

As the leading trio went up the final climb to Peyragudes, McNulty continued to set the tempo, gradually increasing their lead over the chasers. Pogačar and Vingegaard stayed behind McNulty throughout the climb, with both riders preparing for the final ramp to the finish line. With around 300 metres (980 ft) left, Pogačar and Vingegaard started preparing their sprint, with Vingegaard launching first. Pogačar stayed on his wheel before passing him close to the finish, taking his third stage win of this Tour. Thomas finished over two minutes down while Bardet and Lutsenko, having been dropped by Thomas, finished a further half a minute behind. The group containing most of the other top ten contenders crossed the line around three and a half minutes down. Yates lost almost nine minutes while Pidcock fell out of GC contention after losing 22 minutes.

In terms of the GC, Vingegaard kept the maillot jaune with an advantage of 2' 18" over Pogačar, who gained four seconds with his stage win. Despite losing over two minutes to the top two, Thomas solidified his third place, having increased his advantage to around three minutes over Nairo Quintana (Arkéa–Samsic) and David Gaudu (Groupama–FDJ) in fourth and fifth, respectively. Bardet leapt up to sixth while Yates dropped to ninth with his time loss.

Stage 17 Result
Rank	Rider	Team	Time
1	Tadej Pogačar (SLO)	UAE Team Emirates	3h 25' 51"
2	Jonas Vingegaard (DEN)	Team Jumbo–Visma	+ 0"
3	Brandon McNulty (USA)	UAE Team Emirates	+ 32"
4	Geraint Thomas (GBR)	INEOS Grenadiers	+ 2' 07"
5	Alexey Lutsenko (KAZ)	Astana Qazaqstan Team	+ 2' 34"
6	Romain Bardet (FRA)	Team DSM	+ 2' 38"
7	David Gaudu (FRA)	Groupama–FDJ	+ 3' 27"
8	Aleksandr Vlasov	Bora–Hansgrohe	+ 3' 32"
9	Louis Meintjes (RSA)	Intermarché–Wanty–Gobert Matériaux	+ 3' 32"
10	Nairo Quintana (COL)	Arkéa–Samsic	+ 3' 32"

General classification after Stage 17
Rank	Rider	Team	Time
1	Jonas Vingegaard (DEN)	Team Jumbo–Visma	67h 53' 54"
2	Tadej Pogačar (SLO)	UAE Team Emirates	+ 2' 18"
3	Geraint Thomas (GBR)	INEOS Grenadiers	+ 4' 56"
4	Nairo Quintana (COL)	Arkéa–Samsic	+ 7' 53"
5	David Gaudu (FRA)	Groupama–FDJ	+ 7' 57"
6	Romain Bardet (FRA)	Team DSM	+ 9' 21"
7	Louis Meintjes (RSA)	Intermarché–Wanty–Gobert Matériaux	+ 9' 24"
8	Aleksandr Vlasov	Bora–Hansgrohe	+ 9' 56"
9	Adam Yates (GBR)	INEOS Grenadiers	+ 14' 33"
10	Enric Mas (ESP)	Movistar Team	+ 16' 35"

== Stage 18 ==
21 July 2022 – Lourdes to Hautacam, 143.5 km (89.2 mi)

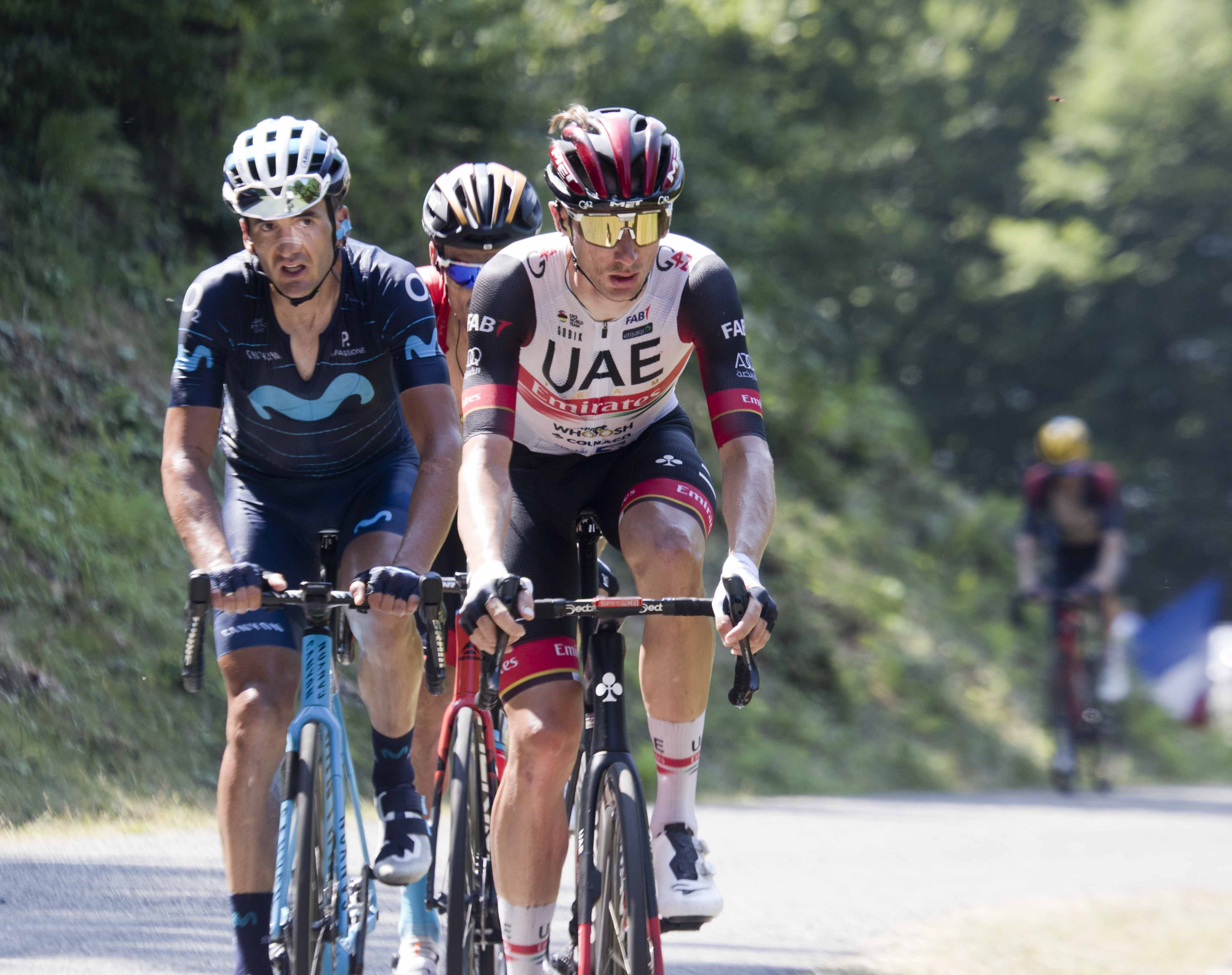
Brandon McNulty (UAE Team Emirates) at the front

The eighteenth stage of the Tour was the final mountain stage of the races, with the riders travelling from Lourdes to a summit finish at Hautacam. The first 60 kilometres (37 mi) were mostly flat, with the riders passing through the intermediate sprint at Laruns after 58.5 kilometres (36.4 mi) of racing. Shortly afterwards, the riders climbed up the hors categorie Col d'Aubisque, a 16.4-kilometre (10.2 mi) climb with an average of 7.1 percent. Following the descent, the riders immediately went up the first-category Col de Spandelles, which is 10.3 kilometres (6.4 mi) long with an average of 8.3 percent. After negotiating a technical descent, the riders tackled the final climb of the day, the hors categorie climb to Hautacam. The climb, last tackled in 2014, is 13.6 kilometres (8.5 mi) long with an average of 7.8 percent.

There was another furious fight for the break at the start of the stage. It took around 40 kilometres (25 mi) before a group of 33 riders got a gap from the peloton. The best-placed GC rider was Enric Mas (Movistar Team), tenth at 16' 35" down on Jonas Vingegaard (Team Jumbo–Visma). With the KoM classification leader, Simon Geschke (Cofidis), missing the break, his team kept the gap stable at around half a minute before Geschke tried to bridge on Col d'Aubisque. However, he was unable to do so and he ended up getting swallowed and dropped by the peloton. On the climb, Team Jumbo–Visma began to set a steady tempo, allowing the break, which began to split, to gain three and a half minutes. Towards the top, Louis Meintjes (Intermarché–Wanty–Gobert Matériaux) attacked from the peloton, building his advantage to around a minute and a half over the GC group. Up front, Giulio Ciccone (Trek–Segafredo) took maximum KoM points to close to within 3 points of Geschke's lead.

On the descent, the break split further, with Mas among those dropped. As the GC group reached the Col de Spandelles, Brandon McNulty (UAE Team Emirates) went to the front to set a faster tempo. The group thinned out before Tadej Pogačar (UAE Team Emirates) launched his attack, but Vingegaard was immediately on his wheel. Pogačar attacked four more times, but the maillot jaune was able to follow each time. Both riders would gradually increase their advantage over the other contenders. Meanwhile, up front, only Wout van Aert (Team Jumbo–Visma), Thibaut Pinot (Groupama–FDJ), and Daniel Martínez (INEOS Grenadiers) were left. Van Aert took maximum KoM points at the top, with the remnants of the break scattered behind the lead trio. Pogačar and Vingegaard crossed the top at a minute and a half down. On the technical descent, Pogačar began to push on, with Vingegaard almost crashing at one point. On one corner, Pogačar crashed himself, getting cuts on his left leg. In a moment of sportsmanship, Vingegaard slowed down and waited for Pogačar, who got back on his bike and quickly caught up with the Dane. At the bottom of the descent, the two were caught by a group containing Meintjes, Geraint Thomas (INEOS Grenadiers), Hugo Houle (Israel–Premier Tech), and two of Vingegaard's teammates, Tiesj Benoot and Sepp Kuss. Up front, the lead trio entered the base of Hautacam with a lead of two and a half minutes over the maillot jaune group.

On the climb, Benoot and then Kuss began to set a furious pace in the maillot jaune group. Houle, Meintjes, and Thomas were soon dropped, leaving only Pogačar and Vingegaard with Kuss. They passed the remnants of the break before making contact with the front group with around 5 kilometres (3.1 mi) left. Van Aert soon set the pace as Kuss dropped. He continued to set the tempo before Pogačar was dropped with around 4 kilometres (2.5 mi) remaining. As van Aert finished his turn, Vingegaard soloed off the front, gradually increasing his lead over Pogačar to win the stage, his second of the Tour. By taking maximum KoM points at the top of Hautacam, Vingegaard also moved into the lead of the KoM classification. Pogačar finished second at over a minute down while van Aert held on for third, more than two minutes behind his teammate. The other contenders lost somewhere between almost three minutes and seven and a half minutes.

In the GC, Vingegaard solidified his maillot jaune, extending his lead to almost three and a half minutes over Pogačar. Thomas kept third place at exactly eight minutes down. David Gaudu (Groupama–FDJ) rose to fourth while Nairo Quintana (Arkéa–Samsic) dropped to fifth. Alexey Lutsenko (Astana Qazaqstan Team) entered the top ten after finishing the stage in sixth.

Stage 18 Result
Rank	Rider	Team	Time
1	Jonas Vingegaard (DEN)	Team Jumbo–Visma	3h 59' 50"
2	Tadej Pogačar (SLO)	UAE Team Emirates	+ 1' 04"
3	Wout van Aert (BEL)	Team Jumbo–Visma	+ 2' 10"
4	Geraint Thomas (GBR)	INEOS Grenadiers	+ 2' 54"
5	David Gaudu (FRA)	Groupama–FDJ	+ 2' 58"
6	Alexey Lutsenko (KAZ)	Astana Qazaqstan Team	+ 3' 09"
7	Daniel Martínez (COL)	INEOS Grenadiers	+ 3' 09"
8	Sepp Kuss (USA)	Team Jumbo–Visma	+ 3' 27"
9	Aleksandr Vlasov	Bora–Hansgrohe	+ 4' 04"
10	Thibaut Pinot (FRA)	Groupama–FDJ	+ 4' 09"

General classification after Stage 18
Rank	Rider	Team	Time
1	Jonas Vingegaard (DEN)	Team Jumbo–Visma	71h 53' 34"
2	Tadej Pogačar (SLO)	UAE Team Emirates	+ 3' 26"
3	Geraint Thomas (GBR)	INEOS Grenadiers	+ 8' 00"
4	David Gaudu (FRA)	Groupama–FDJ	+ 11' 05"
5	Nairo Quintana (COL)	Arkéa–Samsic	+ 13' 35"
6	Louis Meintjes (RSA)	Intermarché–Wanty–Gobert Matériaux	+ 13' 43"
7	Aleksandr Vlasov	Bora–Hansgrohe	+ 14' 10"
8	Romain Bardet (FRA)	Team DSM	+ 16' 11"
9	Alexey Lutsenko (KAZ)	Astana Qazaqstan Team	+ 20' 09"
10	Adam Yates (GBR)	INEOS Grenadiers	+ 20' 17"

== Stage 19 ==
22 July 2022 – Castelnau-Magnoac to Cahors, 188.5 km (117.1 mi)

The nineteenth stage featured a transition stage from Castelnau-Magnoac to Cahors that was expected to suit the sprinters. The entirety of the stage was mostly flat, apart from a few lumps and two fourth-category climbs in the final third of the stage. The intermediate sprint was located in Auch after 38.4 kilometres (23.9 mi) of racing. The finish of the stage was slightly uphill.

A few kilometres after the stage's official start, a five-man group consisting of Quinn Simmons (Trek–Segafredo), Mikkel Honoré (Quick-Step Alpha Vinyl Team), Nils Politt (Bora–Hansgrohe), Matej Mohorič (Team Bahrain Victorious), and Taco van der Hoorn (Intermarché–Wanty–Gobert Matériaux) were able to escape from the peloton. The break increased their advantage to as much as a minute and a half while the sprinters' teams controlled the gap. With around 155 kilometres (96 mi) to go, the race was neutralised due to protests in the middle of the road, like what happened on stage 10. The race was restarted shortly after. With around 124 kilometres (77 mi) to go, the peloton came to within 10 seconds of catching the break, but Honoré attacked once again. Simmons, Mohoric, and van der Hoorn followed him while Politt sat up and went back to the peloton. The break was allowed to increase their lead to a minute again. As the break neared the top of the first fourth-category climb, Mohoric and Simmons dropped Honoré and van der Hoorn. 48 kilometres (30 mi) from the finish, Simmons dropped Mohoric as the peloton closed in on the break. Simmons stayed out front until he was caught with 34 kilometres (21 mi) to go.

Immediately afterwards, Alexis Gougeard (B&B Hotels–KTM) attacked from the peloton. Tadej Pogačar (UAE Team Emirates) was among those who tried to bridge up to him but he was quickly marked by Wout van Aert (Team Jumbo–Visma). Gougeard was eventually joined by Fred Wright (Team Bahrain Victorious) and Jasper Stuyven (Trek–Segafredo), with the trio building a lead of around half a minute. The sprinters' teams kept them in check, gradually reeling them in towards the finish. With the break in sight in the final 2 kilometres (1.2 mi), Christophe Laporte (Team Jumbo–Visma) accelerated from the peloton, bridging towards the front group. In the final 500 metres (1,600 ft), as the remnants of the break were about to be caught, Laporte accelerated out front. He held his gap over the sprinters to win the stage, the first by a French rider in this Tour. Jasper Philipsen (Alpecin–Deceuninck) led the peloton across, one second down. There were no changes in the top ten as Jonas Vingegaard (Team Jumbo–Visma) kept maillot jaune ahead of the penultimate day time trial.

Stage 19 Result
Rank	Rider	Team	Time
1	Christophe Laporte (FRA)	Team Jumbo–Visma	3h 52' 04"
2	Jasper Philipsen (BEL)	Alpecin–Deceuninck	+ 1"
3	Alberto Dainese (ITA)	Team DSM	+ 1"
4	Florian Sénéchal (FRA)	Quick-Step Alpha Vinyl Team	+ 1"
5	Tadej Pogačar (SLO)	UAE Team Emirates	+ 1"
6	Amaury Capiot (BEL)	Arkéa–Samsic	+ 1"
7	Dylan Groenewegen (NED)	Team BikeExchange–Jayco	+ 1"
8	Hugo Hofstetter (FRA)	Arkéa–Samsic	+ 1"
9	Luka Mezgec (SLO)	Team BikeExchange–Jayco	+ 1"
10	Caleb Ewan (AUS)	Lotto–Soudal	+ 1"

General classification after Stage 19
Rank	Rider	Team	Time
1	Jonas Vingegaard (DEN)	Team Jumbo–Visma	75h 45' 34"
2	Tadej Pogačar (SLO)	UAE Team Emirates	+ 3' 26"
3	Geraint Thomas (GBR)	INEOS Grenadiers	+ 8' 00"
4	David Gaudu (FRA)	Groupama–FDJ	+ 11' 05"
5	Nairo Quintana (COL)	Arkéa–Samsic	+ 13' 35"
6	Louis Meintjes (RSA)	Intermarché–Wanty–Gobert Matériaux	+ 13' 43"
7	Aleksandr Vlasov	Bora–Hansgrohe	+ 14' 10"
8	Romain Bardet (FRA)	Team DSM	+ 16' 11"
9	Alexey Lutsenko (KAZ)	Astana Qazaqstan Team	+ 20' 24"
10	Adam Yates (GBR)	INEOS Grenadiers	+ 20' 32"

== Stage 20 ==
23 July 2022 – Lacapelle-Marival to Rocamadour, 40.7 km (25.3 mi)

The penultimate stage of the Tour featured the second individual time trial of the race, with the riders tackling a 40.7-kilometre (25.3 mi) course from Lacapelle-Marival to Rocamadour. For the first 35 kilometres (22 mi), the course was mostly flat but there were also several lumps on the route. Afterwards, the riders climbed the Côte de Magès, a 1.6-kilometre (0.99 mi) climb with an average of 4.7 percent. Following a short descent, the riders tackled the Côte de l'Hospitalet, which is 1.5 kilometres (0.93 mi) long with an average of 7.8 percent. There were three intermediate time checks located after 10.6 kilometres (6.6 mi), 22.1 kilometres (13.7 mi), and 32.6 kilometres (20.3 mi) of racing.

As is customary for time trial stages, the riders set off in the reverse order of their GC placings. As a result, Caleb Ewan (Lotto–Soudal) was the first rider down the start ramp. The first benchmark time was set by Mikkel Bjerg (UAE Team Emirates), who set a time of 50' 22". Shortly after he finished, the time trial world champion, Filippo Ganna (INEOS Grenadiers), started his ride. He smashed Bjerg's time at all time checks before finishing with a time of 48' 41", almost two minutes faster than Bjerg. Ganna stayed in the hot seat for a long time as several riders tried to beat his time only to fall short each time. Eventually, Wout van Aert (Team Jumbo–Visma), the leader of the points classification, went on to challenge Ganna's time. He went faster at all three time checks before finishing with a time of 47' 59", 42 seconds faster than Ganna.

The focus soon shifted to the battle between the GC contenders as there were several spots in the top ten still to be decided. For the ninth spot, Alexey Lutsenko (Astana Qazaqstan Team) led Adam Yates (INEOS Grenadiers) by only eight seconds, with Lutsenko recognised as the superior time trialist. Lutsenko ended up extending his advantage to almost two minutes as he finished 1' 48" faster than Yates. In the battle for the fifth spot, Nairo Quintana (Arkéa–Samsic), Louis Meintjes (Intermarché–Wanty–Gobert Matériaux), and Aleksandr Vlasov (Bora–Hansgrohe) were only separated by 35 seconds. Vlasov eventually finished with a time of 50' 45", 1' 22" and 3' 02" faster than Quintana and Meintjes, respectively, to move up to fifth on GC, pushing Quintana down to sixth. Additionally, with Meintjes finishing 2' 38" behind Romain Bardet (Team DSM), Bardet rose to seventh on GC while Meintjes dropped to eighth place. David Gaudu (Groupama–FDJ) set a time of 51' 09" to consolidate his fourth spot on GC. The top three on GC, Geraint Thomas (INEOS Grenadiers), Tadej Pogačar (UAE Team Emirates), and the maillot jaune, Jonas Vingegaard (Team Jumbo–Visma), soon went down the start ramp, with all three challenging for the stage win. Pogačar and Thomas finished 27 and 32 seconds down on van Aert, respectively, to keep their second and third places on GC. Meanwhile, Vingegaard was slightly faster than van Aert at all time checks but he purposely lost time towards the finish to grant Wout van Aert his third stage of the race, as proven in the Netflix documentary Tour de France: Unchained, by 19 seconds. Vingegaard extended his advantage on GC to 3' 34" ahead of Pogačar to put him on the cusp on winning his first Tour title.

Stage 20 Result
Rank	Rider	Team	Time
1	Wout van Aert (BEL)	Team Jumbo–Visma	47' 59"
2	Jonas Vingegaard (DEN)	Team Jumbo–Visma	+ 19"
3	Tadej Pogačar (SLO)	UAE Team Emirates	+ 27"
4	Geraint Thomas (GBR)	INEOS Grenadiers	+ 32"
5	Filippo Ganna (ITA)	INEOS Grenadiers	+ 42"
6	Bauke Mollema (NED)	Trek–Segafredo	+ 1' 22"
7	Mattia Cattaneo (ITA)	Quick-Step Alpha Vinyl Team	+ 1' 25"
8	Fred Wright (GBR)	Team Bahrain Victorious	+ 1' 32"
9	Maximilian Schachmann (GER)	Bora–Hansgrohe	+ 1' 37"
10	Jan Tratnik (SLO)	Team Bahrain Victorious	+ 1' 48"

General classification after Stage 20
Rank	Rider	Team	Time
1	Jonas Vingegaard (DEN)	Team Jumbo–Visma	76h 33' 57"
2	Tadej Pogačar (SLO)	UAE Team Emirates	+ 3' 34"
3	Geraint Thomas (GBR)	INEOS Grenadiers	+ 8' 13"
4	David Gaudu (FRA)	Groupama–FDJ	+ 13' 56"
5	Aleksandr Vlasov	Bora–Hansgrohe	+ 16' 37"
6	Nairo Quintana (COL)	Arkéa–Samsic	+ 17' 24"
7	Romain Bardet (FRA)	Team DSM	+ 19' 02"
8	Louis Meintjes (RSA)	Intermarché–Wanty–Gobert Matériaux	+ 19' 12"
9	Alexey Lutsenko (KAZ)	Astana Qazaqstan Team	+ 23' 47"
10	Adam Yates (GBR)	INEOS Grenadiers	+ 25' 43"

== Stage 21 ==
24 July 2022 – Paris La Défense Arena to Paris (Champs-Élysées), 116 km (72 mi)

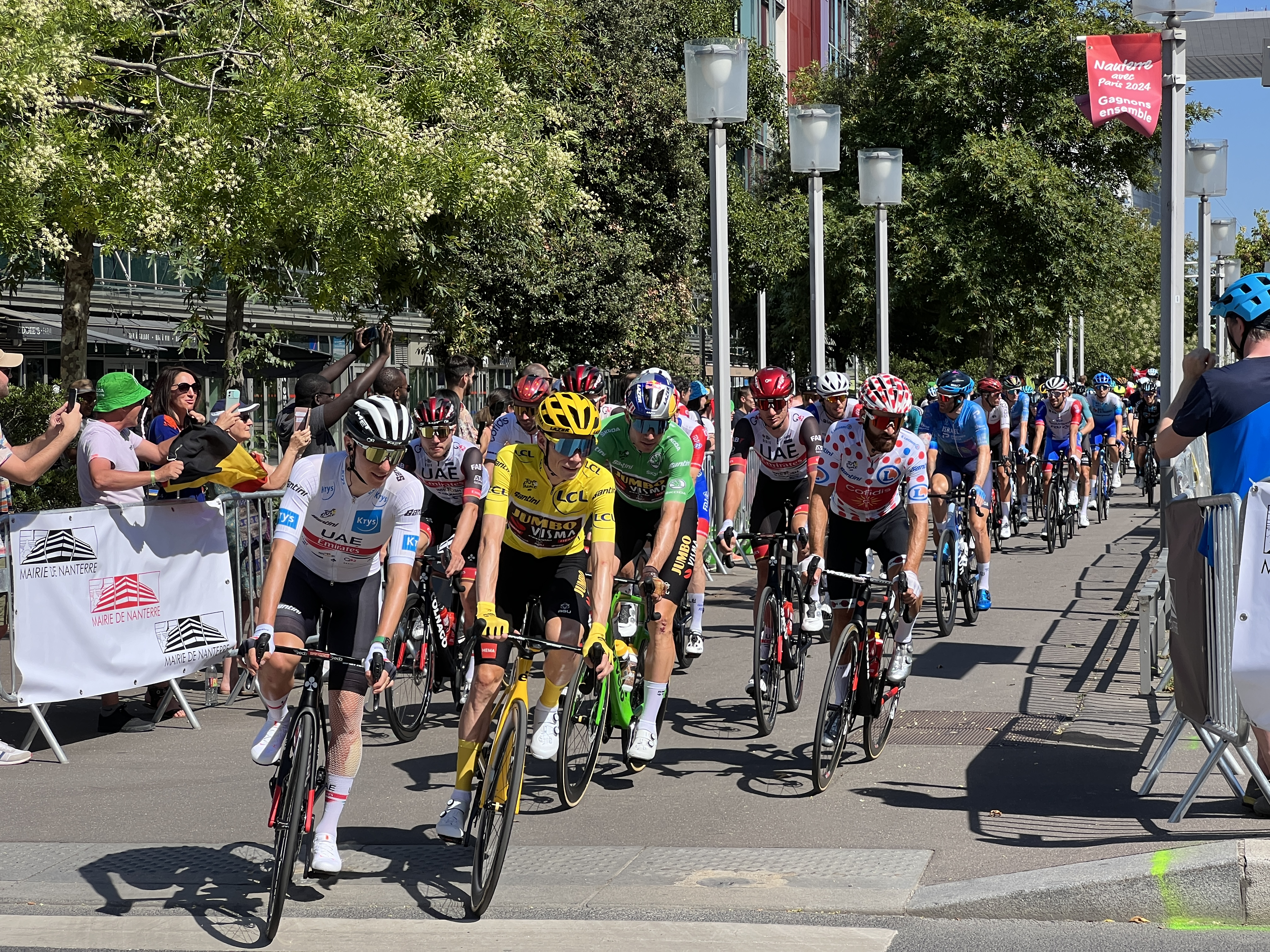
Peloton leaving Paris La Défense Arena, led by Jonas Vingegaard in the yellow jersey

The final stage of the Tour featured the traditional final stage to Champs-Élysées for a final battle amongst the sprinters. Starting inside the Paris La Défense Arena, the route initially headed out of Paris, with the first 43.3 kilometres (26.9 mi) featured mostly rolling terrain, with the riders tackling one fourth-category climb. Shortly afterwards, the riders headed towards the Champs-Élysées, where they tackled eight laps of the traditional circuit. The riders passed through the intermediate sprint with 40 kilometres (25 mi) left during the third lap.

Just like in previous editions, the first part of the stage was ridden as a celebratory procession, with no riders seriously attacking before they reached the Champs-Élysées. As the riders reached the first lap of the circuit, a group of five riders went off the front. The group was composed of Stan Dewulf (AG2R Citroën Team), Stefan Bissegger (EF Education–EasyPost), Daniel Martínez (INEOS Grenadiers), Jan Tratnik (Team Bahrain Victorious), and Mathieu Burgaudeau (Team TotalEnergies). They were soon joined by Matteo Jorgenson (Movistar Team) but the lead group was not given much of a lead and they were soon brought back with around 32 kilometres (20 mi) remaining. Shortly afterwards, another group containing Max Schachmann (Bora–Hansgrohe), the EF Education–EasyPost duo of Jonas Rutsch and Owain Doull, and the Groupama–FDJ duo of Olivier Le Gac and Antoine Duchesne gained a lead of around half a minute over the peloton. The gap stabilized as the peloton kept them on a tight leash.

As the riders headed towards the final lap, the riders from the break dropped one by one until they were caught just before the riders reached the final lap. Immediately afterwards, there was an attack by Tadej Pogačar (UAE Team Emirates) and the INEOS Grenadiers pair of Geraint Thomas and Filippo Ganna, but they were not given much of a gap. Heading towards the finish, the sprinters' teams prepared their lead-out trains for the final sprint. Inside the final kilometer, Team BikeExchange–Jayco led it out at the front, with their lead sprinter, Dylan Groenewegen, launching his sprint first. He continued to lead until Jasper Philipsen (Alpecin–Deceuninck) went around him and went to the other side of the road to comfortably win the sprint, his second win of the Tour. Jonas Vingegaard (Team Jumbo–Visma) finished together with the rest of his team to confirm his first Tour victory, losing 51 seconds in the process. Everyone else finished safely in the peloton as the jersey winners confirmed their victories in the classifications. The traditional prize-giving commenced shortly afterwards. The race had the fewest finishers since 2000, with just 135 of the 176 starters reaching the finish line in Paris.

Stage 21 Result
Rank	Rider	Team	Time
1	Jasper Philipsen (BEL)	Alpecin–Deceuninck	2h 58' 32"
2	Dylan Groenewegen (NED)	Team BikeExchange–Jayco	+ 0"
3	Alexander Kristoff (NOR)	Intermarché–Wanty–Gobert Matériaux	+ 0"
4	Jasper Stuyven (BEL)	Trek–Segafredo	+ 0"
5	Peter Sagan (SVK)	Team TotalEnergies	+ 0"
6	Jérémy Lecroq (FRA)	B&B Hotels–KTM	+ 0"
7	Danny van Poppel (NED)	Bora–Hansgrohe	+ 0"
8	Caleb Ewan (AUS)	Lotto–Soudal	+ 0"
9	Hugo Hofstetter (FRA)	Arkéa–Samsic	+ 0"
10	Fred Wright (GBR)	Team Bahrain Victorious	+ 0"

Final general classification
Rank	Rider	Team	Time
1	Jonas Vingegaard (DEN)	Team Jumbo–Visma	79h 33' 20"
2	Tadej Pogačar (SLO)	UAE Team Emirates	+ 2' 43"
3	Geraint Thomas (GBR)	INEOS Grenadiers	+ 7' 22"
4	David Gaudu (FRA)	Groupama–FDJ	+ 13' 39"
5	Aleksandr Vlasov	Bora–Hansgrohe	+ 15' 46"
6	Nairo Quintana (COL)	Arkéa–Samsic	+ 16' 33"
7	Romain Bardet (FRA)	Team DSM	+ 18' 11"
8	Louis Meintjes (RSA)	Intermarché–Wanty–Gobert Matériaux	+ 19' 12"
9	Alexey Lutsenko (KAZ)	Astana Qazaqstan Team	+ 22' 56"
10	Adam Yates (GBR)	INEOS Grenadiers	+ 24' 52"
