= Col de Portel =

Mountain pass in the French Pyrenees

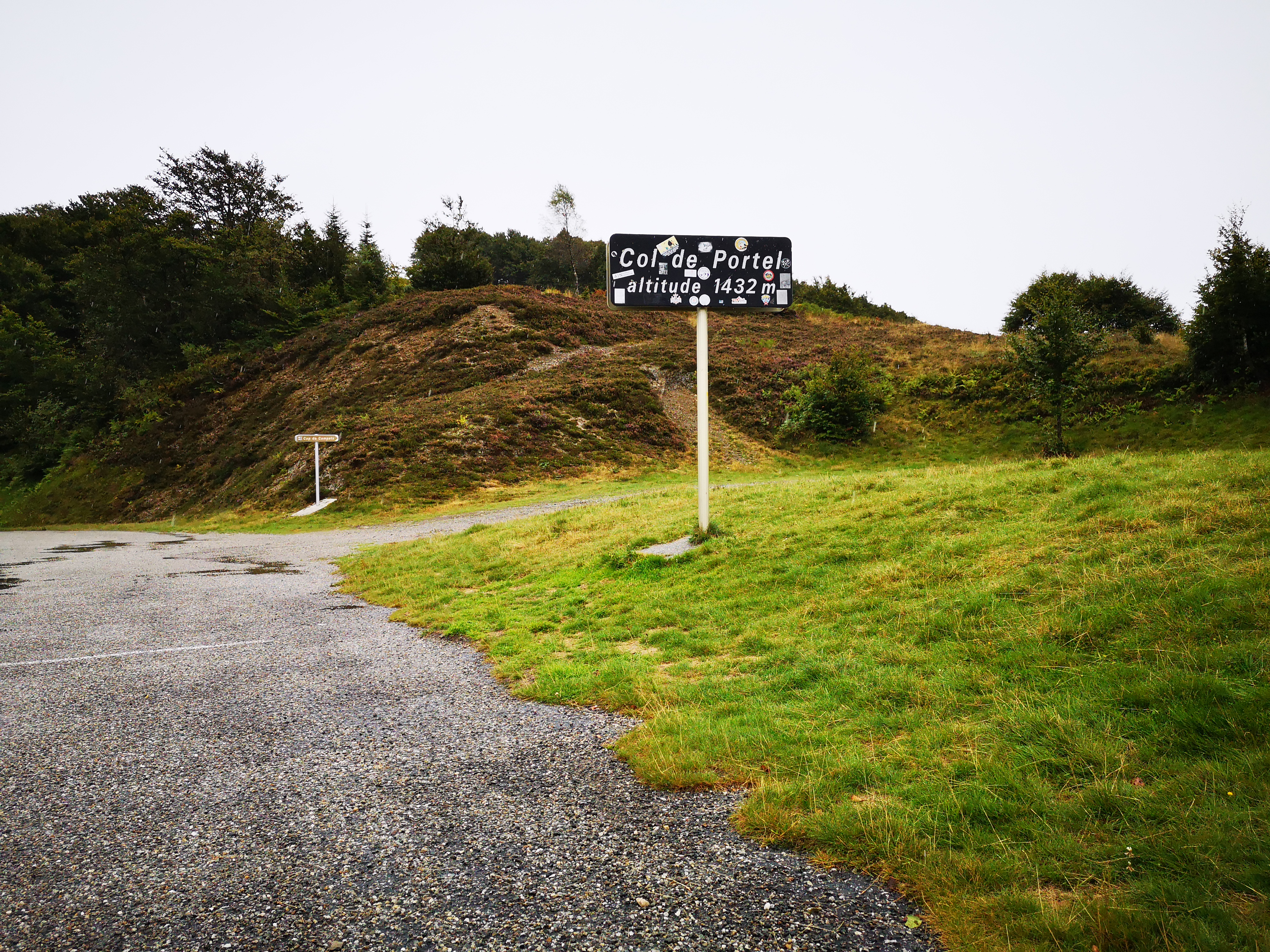

- Location within Pyrenees
- Elevation: 1,432 metres (4,698 ft)
- Traversed by: D72

Third Approach
- Location: Ariège, France
- Range: Pyrenees
- Coordinates: 42°55′43″N 01°21′28″E

Col de Portel (el. 1,432 m.) is a mountain pass in the French Pyrenees between Saint-Girons and Foix in the "massif de l'Arize".

== Details of the climb ==
From Saint-Girons (west), the climb to the Col de Portel crosses the Col de la Crouzette (1,241 m). To the Col de la Crouzette the climb is 11.2 km long, at an average gradient of 6.5%, with a short section at 10.8%. From the Col de la Crouzette to the summit is a further 3.5 km, gaining an extra 181 m, at an average gradient of 5.2% with the steepest section (near the summit) at 8.0%.

Starting from la Mouline, (east) the climb to the Col de Portel crosses the Mur de Péguère (1,375 m). To the Mur de Péguère the climb is 18 km long; over this distance, the climb is 872 m (an average of 4.8%). From the Mur de Péguère to the summit is a further 3.5 km, gaining a further 57 m height.

== Appearances in the Tour de France ==
The Col de Portel was crossed on stage 11 of the 2008 Tour de France.

Year	Stage	Category	Start	Finish	Leader at the summit
2008	11	1	Lannemezan	Foix	Amaël Moinard (FRA)

== See also ==
- List of highest paved roads in Europe
- List of mountain passes
