= Castelnau-Magnoac =

- Commune
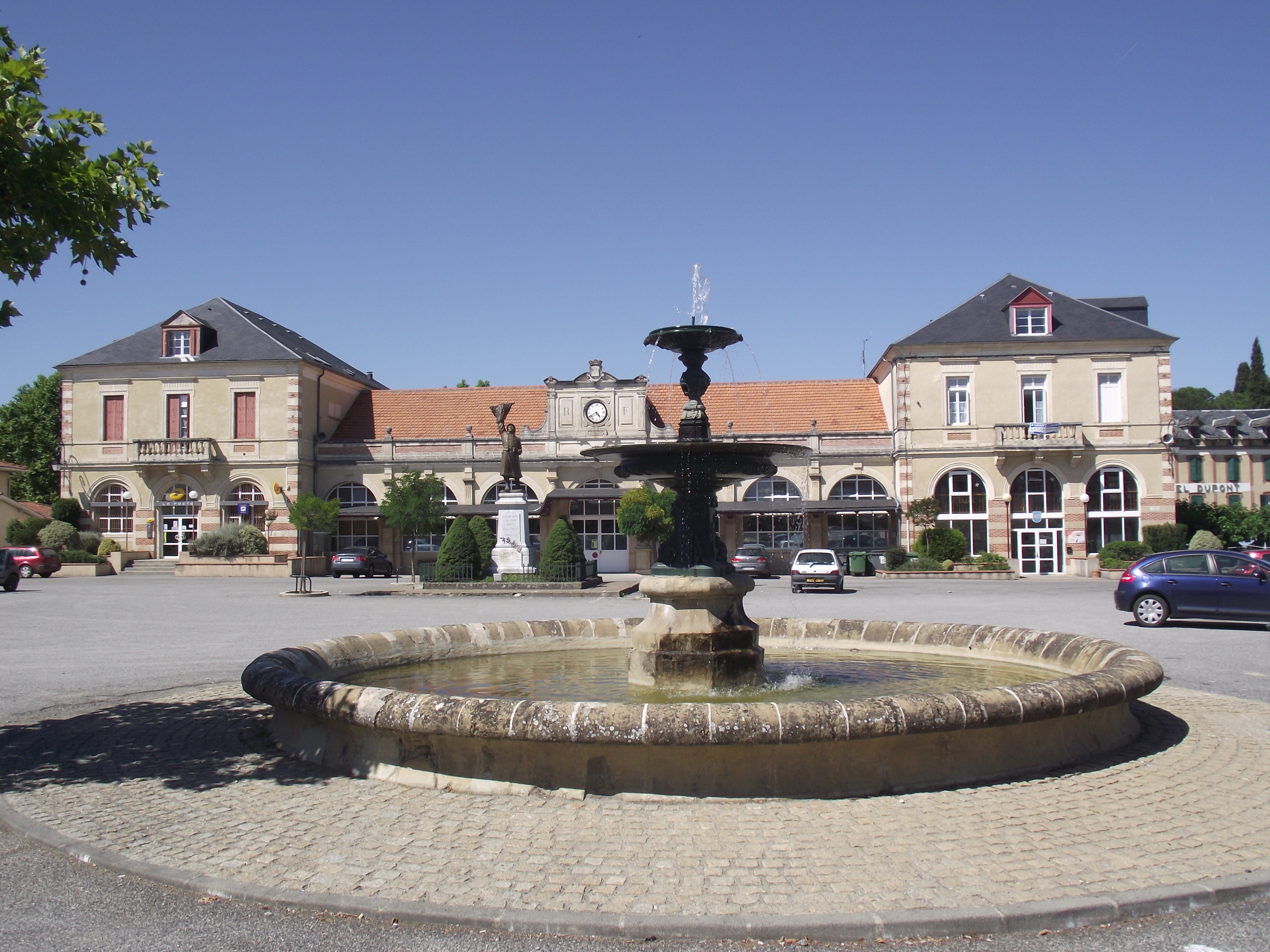
- Fountain in the Place de la Pourcaou

- Coat of arms
- Location of Castelnau-Magnoac
- Location within France Location within Occitanie
- Coordinates: 43°17′44″N 0°30′29″E
- Country: France
- Region: Occitania
- Department: Hautes-Pyrénées
- Arrondissement: Tarbes
- Canton: Les Coteaux
- Intercommunality: Pays de Trie et du Magnoac

Government
  - Mayor (2020–2026): Bernard Verdier
- Area^{1}: 12.56 km^{2} (4.85 sq mi)
- Elevation: 367 m (1,204 ft)
- Highest elevation: 385 m (1,263 ft)
- Lowest elevation: 249 m (817 ft)
- Population (2023): 750
  - Density: 60/km^{2} (150/sq mi)
- Time zone: UTC+01:00 (CET)
  - Summer (DST): UTC+02:00 (CEST)
- INSEE/Postal code: 65129 /65230
- ^{1} French Land Register data, which excludes lakes, ponds, glaciers > 1 km^{2} (0.386 sq mi or 247 acres) and river estuaries.

Castelnau-Magnoac (French pronunciation: [kastɛlno maɲɔak]; Occitan: Castèthnau de Manhoac) is a commune in the Hautes-Pyrénées department in south-western France.

== Geography ==
=== Climate ===
Castelnau-Magnoac experiences an oceanic climate (Köppen climate classification Cfb). The average annual temperature is 12.7 °C (54.9 °F), with May being the wettest month. The average annual rainfall totals 876.6 mm (34.51 in). August is typically the warmest month, with average temperatures around 20.6 °C (69.1 °F), while January is the coldest, averaging 5.4 °C (41.7 °F).

The highest temperature ever recorded in Castelnau-Magnoac was 39.7 °C (103.5 °F) on 13 August 2003. The coldest recorded temperature was −11.8 °C (10.8 °F) on 25 December 2001.

Climate data for Castelnau-Magnoac (1991−2020 normals, extremes 1986−present)
Month	Jan	Feb	Mar	Apr	May	Jun	Jul	Aug	Sep	Oct	Nov	Dec	Year
Source: Météo-France

== See also ==
- Communes of the Hautes-Pyrénées department
