= List of teams and cyclists in the 2022 Tour de France =

List of cyclists

The number of riders per nation that participated in the 2022 Tour de France: 20+ / 10–19 / 2–9 / 1

176 riders across 22 eight-member teams took part in the 2022 Tour de France. Twenty-seven (Note: As of 1 March 2022, the UCI announced that cyclists from Russia and Belarus would no longer compete under the name or flag of those respective countries due to the Russian invasion of Ukraine.) nationalities took part, with the largest percentage being French (11% of the peloton). 135 riders finished the event.

== Teams ==
UCI WorldTeams

- AG2R Citroën Team
- Astana Qazaqstan Team
- Bora–Hansgrohe
- Cofidis
- EF Education–EasyPost
- Groupama–FDJ
- INEOS Grenadiers
- Intermarché–Wanty–Gobert Matériaux
- Israel–Premier Tech
- Lotto–Soudal
- Movistar Team
- Quick-Step Alpha Vinyl Team
- Team Bahrain Victorious
- Team BikeExchange–Jayco
- Team DSM
- Team Jumbo–Visma
- Trek–Segafredo
- UAE Team Emirates

UCI ProTeams

- Alpecin–Deceuninck
- Arkéa–Samsic
- B&B Hotels–KTM
- Team TotalEnergies

== Cyclists ==
Legend
No.	Starting number worn by the rider during the Tour
Pos.	Position in the general classification
Time	Deficit to the winner of the general classification
‡	Denotes riders born on or after 1 January 1997 eligible for the young rider classification
General classification	Denotes the winner of the general classification
Points classification	Denotes the winner of the points classification
Mountains classification	Denotes the winner of the mountains classification
Young rider classification	Denotes the winner of the young rider classification (eligibility indicated by ‡)
Team classification	Denotes riders that represent the winner of the team classification
Super-combativity award	Denotes the winner of the super-combativity award
DNS	Denotes a rider who did not start a stage, followed by the stage before which he withdrew
DNF	Denotes a rider who did not finish a stage, followed by the stage in which he withdrew
DSQ	Denotes a rider who was disqualified from the race, followed by the stage in which this occurred
OTL	Denotes a rider finished outside the time limit, followed by the stage in which they did so
COV	Denotes a rider who withdrawn because of COVID-19 either because he tested positive or two members of team tested positive, followed by the stage before which he withdrew
Ages correct as of Friday 1 July 2022, the date on which the Tour begins

=== By starting number ===
No.	Name	Nationality	Team	Age	Pos.	Time	Ref.
1	Tadej Pogačar ‡	Slovenia	UAE Team Emirates	23	2	+ 2' 43"	
2	George Bennett	New Zealand	UAE Team Emirates	32	COV-10	–	
3	Mikkel Bjerg ‡	Denmark	UAE Team Emirates	23	124	+ 5h 00' 13"	
4	Vegard Stake Laengen	Norway	UAE Team Emirates	33	COV-8	–	
5	Rafał Majka	Poland	UAE Team Emirates	32	DNS-17	–	
6	Brandon McNulty ‡	United States	UAE Team Emirates	24	20	+ 1h 31' 19"	
7	Marc Soler	Spain	UAE Team Emirates	28	OTL-16	–	
8	Marc Hirschi ‡	Switzerland	UAE Team Emirates	23	127	+ 5h 15' 09"	
11	Primož Roglič	Slovenia	Team Jumbo–Visma	32	DNS-15	–	
12	Tiesj Benoot	Belgium	Team Jumbo–Visma	28	36	+ 2h 23' 34"	
13	Steven Kruijswijk	Netherlands	Team Jumbo–Visma	35	DNF-15	–	
14	Sepp Kuss	United States	Team Jumbo–Visma	27	18	+ 1h 02' 29"	
15	Christophe Laporte	France	Team Jumbo–Visma	29	75	+ 3h 40' 10"	
16	Wout van Aert	Belgium	Team Jumbo–Visma	27	22	+ 1h 35' 55"	
17	Nathan Van Hooydonck	Belgium	Team Jumbo–Visma	26	DNS-20	–	
18	Jonas Vingegaard	Denmark	Team Jumbo–Visma	25	1	79h 33' 20"	
21	Geraint Thomas	Great Britain	INEOS Grenadiers	36	3	+ 7' 22"	
22	Daniel Martínez	Colombia	INEOS Grenadiers	26	30	+ 2h 00' 55"	
23	Jonathan Castroviejo	Spain	INEOS Grenadiers	35	49	+ 2h 51' 34"	
24	Filippo Ganna	Italy	INEOS Grenadiers	25	95	+ 4h 03' 31"	
25	Thomas Pidcock ‡	Great Britain	INEOS Grenadiers	22	17	+ 1h 01' 15"	
26	Luke Rowe	Great Britain	INEOS Grenadiers	32	106	+ 4h 26' 40"	
27	Dylan van Baarle	Netherlands	INEOS Grenadiers	30	32	+ 2h 15' 34"	
28	Adam Yates	Great Britain	INEOS Grenadiers	29	10	+ 24' 52"	
31	Ben O'Connor	Australia	AG2R Citroën Team	26	DNS-10	–	
32	Geoffrey Bouchard	France	AG2R Citroën Team	30	COV-8	–	
33	Mikaël Cherel	France	AG2R Citroën Team	36	COV-16	–	
34	Benoît Cosnefroy	France	AG2R Citroën Team	26	91	+ 3h 58' 31"	
35	Stan Dewulf ‡	Belgium	AG2R Citroën Team	24	65	+ 3h 29' 18"	
36	Bob Jungels	Luxembourg	AG2R Citroën Team	29	12	+ 45' 23"	
37	Oliver Naesen	Belgium	AG2R Citroën Team	31	DNF-11	–	
38	Aurélien Paret-Peintre	France	AG2R Citroën Team	26	COV-16	–	
41	Aleksandr Vlasov		Bora–Hansgrohe	26	5	+ 15' 46"	
42	Felix Großschartner	Austria	Bora–Hansgrohe	28	53	+ 2h 58' 15"	
43	Marco Haller	Austria	Bora–Hansgrohe	31	87	+ 3h 53' 05"	
44	Lennard Kämna	Germany	Bora–Hansgrohe	25	DNS-16	–	
45	Patrick Konrad	Austria	Bora–Hansgrohe	30	16	+ 56' 54"	
46	Nils Politt	Germany	Bora–Hansgrohe	28	56	+ 3h 10' 29"	
47	Maximilian Schachmann	Germany	Bora–Hansgrohe	28	46	+ 2h 44' 04"	
48	Danny van Poppel	Netherlands	Bora–Hansgrohe	28	109	+ 4h 30' 28"	
51	Fabio Jakobsen	Netherlands	Quick-Step Alpha Vinyl Team	25	130	+ 5h 23' 38"	
52	Kasper Asgreen	Denmark	Quick-Step Alpha Vinyl Team	27	DNS-9	–	
53	Andrea Bagioli ‡	Italy	Quick-Step Alpha Vinyl Team	23	98	+ 4h 10' 00"	
54	Mattia Cattaneo	Italy	Quick-Step Alpha Vinyl Team	31	96	+ 4h 03' 52"	
55	Mikkel Frølich Honoré ‡	Denmark	Quick-Step Alpha Vinyl Team	25	112	+ 4h 36' 55"	
56	Yves Lampaert	Belgium	Quick-Step Alpha Vinyl Team	31	120	+ 4h 46' 14"	
57	Michael Mørkøv	Denmark	Quick-Step Alpha Vinyl Team	37	OTL-15	–	
58	Florian Sénéchal	France	Quick-Step Alpha Vinyl Team	28	107	+ 4h 28' 14"	
61	Enric Mas	Spain	Movistar Team	27	COV-19	–	
62	Imanol Erviti	Spain	Movistar Team	38	COV-18	–	
63	Gorka Izagirre	Spain	Movistar Team	34	DNS-21	–	
64	Matteo Jorgenson ‡	United States	Movistar Team	23	21	+ 1h 33' 57"	
65	Gregor Mühlberger	Austria	Movistar Team	28	29	+ 1h 59' 03"	
66	Nelson Oliveira	Portugal	Movistar Team	33	52	+ 2h 57' 39"	
67	Albert Torres	Spain	Movistar Team	32	134	+ 5h 36' 33"	
68	Carlos Verona	Spain	Movistar Team	29	27	+ 1h 53' 03"	
71	Guillaume Martin	France	Cofidis	29	COV-9	–	
72	Pierre-Luc Périchon	France	Cofidis	35	63	+ 3h 25' 32"	
73	Simon Geschke	Germany	Cofidis	36	45	+ 2h 41' 23"	
74	Ion Izagirre	Spain	Cofidis	33	40	+ 2h 30' 08"	
75	Victor Lafay	France	Cofidis	26	DNF-13	–	
76	Anthony Perez	France	Cofidis	31	84	+ 3h 52' 20"	
77	Benjamin Thomas	France	Cofidis	26	54	+ 3h 03' 38"	
78	Max Walscheid	Germany	Cofidis	29	COV-16	–	
81	Jack Haig	Australia	Team Bahrain Victorious	28	DNF-5	–	
82	Damiano Caruso	Italy	Team Bahrain Victorious	34	COV-18	–	
83	Kamil Gradek	Poland	Team Bahrain Victorious	31	118	+ 4h 42' 46"	
84	Matej Mohorič	Slovenia	Team Bahrain Victorious	27	86	+ 3h 52' 57"	
85	Luis León Sánchez	Spain	Team Bahrain Victorious	38	14	+ 49' 18"	
86	Dylan Teuns	Belgium	Team Bahrain Victorious	30	19	+ 1h 11' 30"	
87	Jan Tratnik	Slovenia	Team Bahrain Victorious	32	72	+ 3h 37' 31"	
88	Fred Wright ‡	Great Britain	Team Bahrain Victorious	23	55	+ 3h 04' 08"	
91	David Gaudu	France	Groupama–FDJ	25	4	+ 13' 39"	
92	Antoine Duchesne	Canada	Groupama–FDJ	30	62	+ 3h 18' 18"	
93	Kevin Geniets ‡	Luxembourg	Groupama–FDJ	25	48	+ 2h 48' 08"	
94	Stefan Küng	Switzerland	Groupama–FDJ	28	33	+ 2h 15' 46"	
95	Olivier Le Gac	France	Groupama–FDJ	28	88	+ 3h 56' 05"	
96	Valentin Madouas	France	Groupama–FDJ	25	11	+ 35' 59"	
97	Thibaut Pinot	France	Groupama–FDJ	32	15	+ 50' 25"	
98	Michael Storer ‡	Australia	Groupama–FDJ	25	35	+ 2h 23' 15"	
101	Mathieu van der Poel	Netherlands	Alpecin–Deceuninck	27	DNF-11	–	
102	Silvan Dillier	Switzerland	Alpecin–Deceuninck	31	60	+ 3h 17' 17"	
103	Michael Gogl	Austria	Alpecin–Deceuninck	28	DNF-5	–	
104	Alexander Krieger	Germany	Alpecin–Deceuninck	30	104	+ 4h 19' 42"	
105	Jasper Philipsen ‡	Belgium	Alpecin–Deceuninck	24	92	+ 3h 59' 10"	
106	Edward Planckaert	Belgium	Alpecin–Deceuninck	27	110	+ 4h 33' 44"	
107	Kristian Sbaragli	Italy	Alpecin–Deceuninck	32	71	+ 3h 36' 18"	
108	Guillaume Van Keirsbulck	Belgium	Alpecin–Deceuninck	31	123	+ 4h 54' 12"	
111	Romain Bardet	France	Team DSM	31	7	+ 18' 11"	
112	Alberto Dainese ‡	Italy	Team DSM	24	100	+ 4h 14' 14"	
113	John Degenkolb	Germany	Team DSM	33	105	+ 4h 23' 05"	
114	Nils Eekhoff ‡	Netherlands	Team DSM	24	119	+ 4h 42' 46"	
115	Chris Hamilton	Australia	Team DSM	27	38	+ 2h 25' 38"	
116	Andreas Leknessund ‡	Norway	Team DSM	23	28	+ 1h 57' 31"	
117	Martijn Tusveld	Netherlands	Team DSM	28	64	+ 3h 28' 03"	
118	Kevin Vermaerke ‡	United States	Team DSM	21	DNF-8	–	
121	Alexander Kristoff	Norway	Intermarché–Wanty–Gobert Matériaux	34	102	+ 4h 17' 14"	
122	Sven Erik Bystrøm	Norway	Intermarché–Wanty–Gobert Matériaux	30	93	+ 3h 59' 19"	
123	Kobe Goossens	Belgium	Intermarché–Wanty–Gobert Matériaux	26	47	+ 2h 46' 07"	
124	Louis Meintjes	South Africa	Intermarché–Wanty–Gobert Matériaux	30	8	+ 18' 44"	
125	Andrea Pasqualon	Italy	Intermarché–Wanty–Gobert Matériaux	34	51	+ 2h 56' 22"	
126	Adrien Petit	France	Intermarché–Wanty–Gobert Matériaux	31	111	+ 4h 35' 05"	
127	Taco van der Hoorn	Netherlands	Intermarché–Wanty–Gobert Matériaux	28	125	+ 5h 02' 34"	
128	Georg Zimmermann ‡	Germany	Intermarché–Wanty–Gobert Matériaux	24	44	+ 2h 39' 40"	
131	Alexey Lutsenko	Kazakhstan	Astana Qazaqstan Team	29	9	+ 22' 56"	
132	Alexandr Riabushenko		Astana Qazaqstan Team	26	97	+ 4h 04' 20"	
133	Joe Dombrowski	United States	Astana Qazaqstan Team	31	43	+ 2h 37' 51"	
134	Fabio Felline	Italy	Astana Qazaqstan Team	32	DNF-17	–	
135	Dmitriy Gruzdev	Kazakhstan	Astana Qazaqstan Team	36	114	+ 4h 37' 36"	
136	Gianni Moscon	Italy	Astana Qazaqstan Team	28	DNF-8	–	
137	Simone Velasco	Italy	Astana Qazaqstan Team	26	31	+ 2h 04' 24"	
138	Andrey Zeits	Kazakhstan	Astana Qazaqstan Team	35	39	+ 2h 26' 22"	
141	Rigoberto Urán	Colombia	EF Education–EasyPost	35	26	+ 1h 48' 18"	
142	Ruben Guerreiro	Portugal	EF Education–EasyPost	27	DNS-9	–	
143	Alberto Bettiol	Italy	EF Education–EasyPost	28	41	+ 2h 34' 44"	
144	Stefan Bissegger ‡	Switzerland	EF Education–EasyPost	23	83	+ 3h 51' 46"	
145	Owain Doull	Great Britain	EF Education–EasyPost	29	90	+ 3h 58' 19"	
146	Magnus Cort	Denmark	EF Education–EasyPost	29	COV-15	–	
147	Neilson Powless	United States	EF Education–EasyPost	25	13	+ 46' 57"	
148	Jonas Rutsch ‡	Germany	EF Education–EasyPost	24	94	+ 3h 59' 21"	
151	Nairo Quintana	Colombia	Arkéa–Samsic	32	6	+ 16' 33"	
152	Warren Barguil	France	Arkéa–Samsic	30	COV-13	–	
153	Maxime Bouet	France	Arkéa–Samsic	35	50	+ 2h 51' 56"	
154	Amaury Capiot	Belgium	Arkéa–Samsic	29	85	+ 3h 52' 55"	
155	Hugo Hofstetter	France	Arkéa–Samsic	28	82	+ 3h 49' 57"	
156	Matis Louvel ‡	France	Arkéa–Samsic	22	74	+ 3h 40' 06"	
157	Łukasz Owsian	Poland	Arkéa–Samsic	32	42	+ 2h 37' 48"	
158	Connor Swift	Great Britain	Arkéa–Samsic	26	70	+ 3h 35' 05"	
161	Caleb Ewan	Australia	Lotto–Soudal	27	135	+ 5h 40' 42"	
162	Frederik Frison	Belgium	Lotto–Soudal	29	131	+ 5h 30' 19"	
163	Philippe Gilbert	Belgium	Lotto–Soudal	39	76	+ 3h 41' 54"	
164	Reinardt Janse van Rensburg	South Africa	Lotto–Soudal	33	132	+ 5h 31' 25"	
165	Andreas Kron ‡	Denmark	Lotto–Soudal	24	73	+ 3h 37' 37"	
166	Brent Van Moer ‡	Belgium	Lotto–Soudal	24	121	+ 4h 49' 07"	
167	Florian Vermeersch ‡	Belgium	Lotto–Soudal	23	108	+ 4h 28' 53"	
168	Tim Wellens	Belgium	Lotto–Soudal	31	COV-17	–	
171	Mads Pedersen	Denmark	Trek–Segafredo	26	99	+ 4h 11' 50"	
172	Giulio Ciccone	Italy	Trek–Segafredo	27	59	+ 3h 16' 44"	
173	Tony Gallopin	France	Trek–Segafredo	34	37	+ 2h 25' 11"	
174	Alex Kirsch	Luxembourg	Trek–Segafredo	30	DNF-6	–	
175	Bauke Mollema	Netherlands	Trek–Segafredo	35	25	+ 1h 45' 57"	
176	Quinn Simmons ‡	United States	Trek–Segafredo	21	67	+ 3h 30' 44"	
177	Toms Skujiņš	Latvia	Trek–Segafredo	31	61	+ 3h 17' 28"	
178	Jasper Stuyven	Belgium	Trek–Segafredo	30	81	+ 3h 49' 28"	
181	Peter Sagan	Slovakia	Team TotalEnergies	32	116	+ 4h 39' 48"	
182	Edvald Boasson Hagen	Norway	Team TotalEnergies	35	58	+ 3h 12' 58"	
183	Maciej Bodnar	Poland	Team TotalEnergies	37	115	+ 4h 39' 32"	
184	Mathieu Burgaudeau ‡	France	Team TotalEnergies	23	68	+ 3h 32' 06"	
185	Pierre Latour	France	Team TotalEnergies	28	57	+ 3h 12' 06"	
186	Daniel Oss	Italy	Team TotalEnergies	35	DNS-6	–	
187	Anthony Turgis	France	Team TotalEnergies	28	129	+ 5h 20' 17"	
188	Alexis Vuillermoz	France	Team TotalEnergies	34	DNS-10	–	
191	Chris Froome	Great Britain	Israel–Premier Tech	37	COV-18	–	
192	Guillaume Boivin	Canada	Israel–Premier Tech	33	DNS-21	–	
193	Simon Clarke	Australia	Israel–Premier Tech	35	COV-15	–	
194	Jakob Fuglsang	Denmark	Israel–Premier Tech	37	DNS-16	–	
195	Guy Niv	Israel	Israel–Premier Tech	28	77	+ 3h 44' 22"	
196	Hugo Houle	Canada	Israel–Premier Tech	31	24	+ 1h 42' 14"	
197	Krists Neilands	Latvia	Israel–Premier Tech	27	79	+ 3h 46' 16"	
198	Michael Woods	Canada	Israel–Premier Tech	35	COV-21	–	
201	Michael Matthews	Australia	Team BikeExchange–Jayco	31	78	+ 3h 45' 59"	
202	Jack Bauer	New Zealand	Team BikeExchange–Jayco	37	122	+ 4h 51' 05"	
203	Luke Durbridge	Australia	Team BikeExchange–Jayco	31	COV-10	–	
204	Dylan Groenewegen	Netherlands	Team BikeExchange–Jayco	29	117	+ 4h 40' 55"	
205	Amund Grøndahl Jansen	Norway	Team BikeExchange–Jayco	28	133	+ 5h 31' 27"	
206	Christopher Juul-Jensen	Denmark	Team BikeExchange–Jayco	32	128	+ 5h 15' 26"	
207	Luka Mezgec	Slovenia	Team BikeExchange–Jayco	34	101	+ 4h 16' 13"	
208	Nick Schultz	Australia	Team BikeExchange–Jayco	27	23	+ 1h 39' 41"	
211	Franck Bonnamour	France	B&B Hotels–KTM	27	66	+ 3h 30' 36"	
212	Cyril Barthe	France	B&B Hotels–KTM	26	80	+ 3h 48' 34"	
213	Alexis Gougeard	France	B&B Hotels–KTM	29	89	+ 3h 58' 15"	
214	Jérémy Lecroq	France	B&B Hotels–KTM	27	126	+ 5h 13' 49"	
215	Cyril Lemoine	France	B&B Hotels–KTM	39	113	+ 4h 37' 29"	
216	Luca Mozzato ‡	Italy	B&B Hotels–KTM	24	103	+ 4h 18' 54"	
217	Pierre Rolland	France	B&B Hotels–KTM	35	69	+ 3h 34' 33"	
218	Sebastian Schönberger	Austria	B&B Hotels–KTM	28	34	+ 2h 16' 55"	

=== By team ===
(United Arab Emirates) UAE Team Emirates (UAD)
No.	Rider	Pos.
1	Tadej Pogačar (SLO)	2
2	George Bennett (NZL)	COV-10
3	Mikkel Bjerg (DEN)	124
4	Vegard Stake Laengen (NOR)	COV-8
5	Rafał Majka (POL)	DNS-17
6	Brandon McNulty (USA)	20
7	Marc Soler (ESP)	OTL-16
8	Marc Hirschi (SUI)	127
Directeur sportif: Andrej Hauptman, Simone Pedrazzini

(Netherlands) Team Jumbo–Visma (TJV)
No.	Rider	Pos.
11	Primož Roglič (SLO)	DNS-15
12	Tiesj Benoot (BEL)	36
13	Steven Kruijswijk (NED)	DNF-15
14	Sepp Kuss (USA)	18
15	Christophe Laporte (FRA)	75
16	Wout van Aert (BEL)	22
17	Nathan Van Hooydonck (BEL)	DNS-20
18	Jonas Vingegaard (DEN)	1
Directeur sportif: Frans Maassen, Arthur van Dongen

(United Kingdom) INEOS Grenadiers (IGD)
No.	Rider	Pos.
21	Geraint Thomas (GBR)	3
22	Daniel Martínez (COL)	30
23	Jonathan Castroviejo (ESP)	49
24	Filippo Ganna (ITA)	95
25	Thomas Pidcock (GBR)	17
26	Luke Rowe (GBR)	106
27	Dylan van Baarle (NED)	32
28	Adam Yates (GBR)	10
Directeur sportif: Steve Cummings, Gabriel Rasch

(France) AG2R Citroën Team (ALM)
No.	Rider	Pos.
31	Ben O'Connor (AUS)	DNS-10
32	Geoffrey Bouchard (FRA)	COV-8
33	Mikaël Cherel (FRA)	COV-16
34	Benoît Cosnefroy (FRA)	91
35	Stan Dewulf (BEL)	65
36	Bob Jungels (LUX)	12
37	Oliver Naesen (BEL)	DNF-11
38	Aurélien Paret-Peintre (FRA)	COV-16
Directeur sportif: Julien Jurdie, Stéphane Goubert

(Germany) Bora–Hansgrohe (BOH)
No.	Rider	Pos.
41	Aleksandr Vlasov	5
42	Felix Großschartner (AUT)	53
43	Marco Haller (AUT)	87
44	Lennard Kämna (GER)	DNS-16
45	Patrick Konrad (AUT)	16
46	Nils Politt (GER)	56
47	Maximilian Schachmann (GER)	46
48	Danny van Poppel (NED)	109
Directeur sportif: Rolf Aldag, Torsten Schmidt

(Belgium) Quick-Step Alpha Vinyl Team (QST)
No.	Rider	Pos.
51	Fabio Jakobsen (NED)	130
52	Kasper Asgreen (DEN)	DNS-9
53	Andrea Bagioli (ITA)	98
54	Mattia Cattaneo (ITA)	96
55	Mikkel Frølich Honoré (DEN)	112
56	Yves Lampaert (BEL)	120
57	Michael Mørkøv (DEN)	OTL-15
58	Florian Sénéchal (FRA)	107
Directeur sportif: Klaas Lodewyck, Wilfried Peeters

(Spain) Movistar Team (MOV)
No.	Rider	Pos.
61	Enric Mas (ESP)	COV-19
62	Imanol Erviti (ESP)	COV-18
63	Gorka Izagirre (ESP)	DNS-21
64	Matteo Jorgenson (USA)	21
65	Gregor Mühlberger (AUT)	29
66	Nelson Oliveira (POR)	52
67	Albert Torres (ESP)	134
68	Carlos Verona (ESP)	27
Directeur sportif: José Vicente García Acosta, Francisco Javier Vila

(France) Cofidis (COF)
No.	Rider	Pos.
71	Guillaume Martin (FRA)	COV-9
72	Pierre-Luc Périchon (FRA)	63
73	Simon Geschke (GER)	45
74	Ion Izagirre (ESP)	40
75	Victor Lafay (FRA)	DNF-13
76	Anthony Perez (FRA)	84
77	Benjamin Thomas (FRA)	54
78	Max Walscheid (GER)	COV-16
Directeur sportif: Alain Deloeuil, Bingen Fernández

Team Bahrain Victorious (TBV)
No.	Rider	Pos.
81	Jack Haig (AUS)	DNF-5
82	Damiano Caruso (ITA)	COV-18
83	Kamil Gradek (POL)	118
84	Matej Mohorič (SLO)	86
85	Luis León Sánchez (ESP)	14
86	Dylan Teuns (BEL)	19
87	Jan Tratnik (SLO)	72
88	Fred Wright (GBR)	55
Directeur sportif: Gorazd Štangelj, Xavier Florencio

(France) Groupama–FDJ (GFC)
No.	Rider	Pos.
91	David Gaudu (FRA)	4
92	Antoine Duchesne (CAN)	62
93	Kevin Geniets (LUX)	48
94	Stefan Küng (SUI)	33
95	Olivier Le Gac (FRA)	88
96	Valentin Madouas (FRA)	11
97	Thibaut Pinot (FRA)	15
98	Michael Storer (AUS)	35
Directeur sportif: Philippe Mauduit, Frédéric Guesdon

(Belgium) Alpecin–Deceuninck (ADC)
No.	Rider	Pos.
101	Mathieu van der Poel (NED)	DNF-11
102	Silvan Dillier (SUI)	60
103	Michael Gogl (AUT)	DNF-5
104	Alexander Krieger (GER)	104
105	Jasper Philipsen (BEL)	92
106	Edward Planckaert (BEL)	110
107	Kristian Sbaragli (ITA)	71
108	Guillaume Van Keirsbulck (BEL)	123
Directeur sportif: Christoph Roodhooft, Frederik Willems

(Netherlands) Team DSM (DSM)
No.	Rider	Pos.
111	Romain Bardet (FRA)	7
112	Alberto Dainese (ITA)	100
113	John Degenkolb (GER)	105
114	Nils Eekhoff (NED)	119
115	Chris Hamilton (AUS)	38
116	Andreas Leknessund (NOR)	28
117	Martijn Tusveld (NED)	64
118	Kevin Vermaerke (USA)	DNF-8
Directeur sportif: Matthew Winston, Philip West

(Belgium) Intermarché–Wanty–Gobert Matériaux (IWG)
No.	Rider	Pos.
121	Alexander Kristoff (NOR)	102
122	Sven Erik Bystrøm (NOR)	93
123	Kobe Goossens (BEL)	47
124	Louis Meintjes (RSA)	8
125	Andrea Pasqualon (ITA)	51
126	Adrien Petit (FRA)	111
127	Taco van der Hoorn (NED)	125
128	Georg Zimmermann (GER)	44
Directeur sportif: Hilaire Van der Schueren, Steven De Neef

(Kazakhstan) Astana Qazaqstan Team (AST)
No.	Rider	Pos.
131	Alexey Lutsenko (KAZ)	9
132	Alexandr Riabushenko	97
133	Joe Dombrowski (USA)	43
134	Fabio Felline (ITA)	DNF-17
135	Dmitriy Gruzdev (KAZ)	114
136	Gianni Moscon (ITA)	DNF-8
137	Simone Velasco (ITA)	31
138	Andrey Zeits (KAZ)	39
Directeur sportif: Alexandr Shefer, Stefano Zanini

(United States) EF Education–EasyPost (EFE)
No.	Rider	Pos.
141	Rigoberto Urán (COL)	26
142	Ruben Guerreiro (POR)	DNS-9
143	Alberto Bettiol (ITA)	41
144	Stefan Bissegger (SUI)	83
145	Owain Doull (GBR)	90
146	Magnus Cort (DEN)	COV-15
147	Neilson Powless (USA)	13
148	Jonas Rutsch (GER)	94
Directeur sportif: Charles Wegelius, Andreas Klier

(France) Arkéa–Samsic (ARK)
No.	Rider	Pos.
151	Nairo Quintana (COL)	6
152	Warren Barguil (FRA)	COV-13
153	Maxime Bouet (FRA)	50
154	Amaury Capiot (BEL)	85
155	Hugo Hofstetter (FRA)	82
156	Matis Louvel (FRA)	74
157	Łukasz Owsian (POL)	42
158	Connor Swift (GBR)	70
Directeur sportif: Yvon Ledanois, Yvon Caer

(Belgium) Lotto–Soudal (LTS)
No.	Rider	Pos.
161	Caleb Ewan (AUS)	135
162	Frederik Frison (BEL)	131
163	Philippe Gilbert (BEL)	76
164	Reinardt Janse van Rensburg (RSA)	132
165	Andreas Kron (DEN)	73
166	Brent Van Moer (BEL)	121
167	Florian Vermeersch (BEL)	108
168	Tim Wellens (BEL)	COV-17
Directeur sportif: Mario Aerts, Allan Davis

(United States) Trek–Segafredo (TFS)
No.	Rider	Pos.
171	Mads Pedersen (DEN)	99
172	Giulio Ciccone (ITA)	59
173	Tony Gallopin (FRA)	37
174	Alex Kirsch (LUX)	DNF-6
175	Bauke Mollema (NED)	25
176	Quinn Simmons (USA)	67
177	Toms Skujiņš (LAT)	61
178	Jasper Stuyven (BEL)	81
Directeur sportif: Kim Andersen, Steven de Jongh

(France) Team TotalEnergies (TEN)
No.	Rider	Pos.
181	Peter Sagan (SVK)	116
182	Edvald Boasson Hagen (NOR)	58
183	Maciej Bodnar (POL)	115
184	Mathieu Burgaudeau (FRA)	68
185	Pierre Latour (FRA)	57
186	Daniel Oss (ITA)	DNS-6
187	Anthony Turgis (FRA)	129
188	Alexis Vuillermoz (FRA)	DNS-10
Directeur sportif: Benoit Genauzeau, Lylian Lebreton

Israel–Premier Tech (IPT)
No.	Rider	Pos.
191	Chris Froome (GBR)	COV-18
192	Guillaume Boivin (CAN)	DNS-21
193	Simon Clarke (AUS)	COV-15
194	Jakob Fuglsang (DEN)	DNS-16
195	Guy Niv (ISR)	77
196	Hugo Houle (CAN)	24
197	Krists Neilands (LAT)	79
198	Michael Woods (CAN)	COV-21
Directeur sportif: Steve Bauer, Nicki Sørensen

(Australia) Team BikeExchange–Jayco (BEX)
No.	Rider	Pos.
201	Michael Matthews (AUS)	78
202	Jack Bauer (NZL)	122
203	Luke Durbridge (AUS)	COV-10
204	Dylan Groenewegen (NED)	117
205	Amund Grøndahl Jansen (NOR)	133
206	Christopher Juul-Jensen (DEN)	128
207	Luka Mezgec (SLO)	101
208	Nick Schultz (AUS)	23
Directeur sportif: Matthew White, Mathew Hayman

(France) B&B Hotels–KTM (BBK)
No.	Rider	Pos.
211	Franck Bonnamour (FRA)	66
212	Cyril Barthe (FRA)	80
213	Alexis Gougeard (FRA)	89
214	Jérémy Lecroq (FRA)	126
215	Cyril Lemoine (FRA)	113
216	Luca Mozzato (ITA)	103
217	Pierre Rolland (FRA)	69
218	Sebastian Schönberger (AUT)	34
Directeur sportif: Samuel Dumoulin, Didier Rous

=== By nationality ===
Country	No. of riders	Finished	Stage wins
Australia	9	5	2 (Simon Clarke, Michael Matthews)
Austria	6	5	
Belgium	18	15	6 (Yves Lampaert, Jasper Philipsen x2, Wout van Aert x3)
Canada	4	2	1 (Hugo Houle)
Colombia	3	3	
Denmark	10	6	4 (Magnus Cort, Jonas Vingegaard x2, Mads Pedersen)
France	32	25	1 (Christophe Laporte)
Germany	9	7	
Great Britain	8	7	1 (Thomas Pidcock)
Israel	1	1	
Italy	14	10	
Kazakhstan	3	3	
Latvia	2	2	
Luxembourg	3	2	1 (Bob Jungels)
Netherlands	10	8	2 (Fabio Jakobsen, Dylan Groenewegen)
New Zealand	2	1	
Norway	6	5	
Poland	4	3	
Portugal	2	1	
Slovakia	1	1	
Slovenia	5	4	3 (Tadej Pogačar x3)
South Africa	2	2	
Spain	9	5	
Switzerland	4	4	
United States	7	6	
	2	2	
Total	176	135	21
