= 2025 in sports =

2025 in sports describes the year's events in world sports.

As an odd-numbered year, 2025 is both a non-Olympic Games and non-FIFA World Cup year. Women's sport takes centre stage in the 2025 sporting calendar with major tournaments in rugby union and cricket. The most prominent quadrennial events for this year are the 2025 Women's Rugby World Cup in England and the 2025 Women's Cricket World Cup in India.

In men's association football, the expanded 2025 FIFA Club World Cup will have its first edition in its new quadrennial format, mirroring other FIFA World Cups, with the former annual format being rebranded as the FIFA Intercontinental Cup. In women's association football, the UEFA Women's Euro 2025 will be held in Switzerland in July. In women's futsal, the 2025 FIFA Futsal Women's World Cup will be hosted by the Philippines in November and this will be the first time that the FIFA will host the FIFA Futsal Women's World Cup. In men's rugby, the British & Irish Lions will tour Australia while in men's cricket, Lord's Cricket Ground in London will host the 2025 ICC World Test Championship final. Other major events for the year include the Ashes test series between Australia and England for both men and women, the 2025 Ryder Cup in men's golf, the biennial world championships in athletics and aquatics and annual major events in tennis and golf, and annual world championship events in a range of sports including gymnastics, cycling, triathlon, weightlifting and badminton. Winter sports will also hold their annual events, but will also gear up qualification processes for the 2026 Winter Olympics in Milan and Cortina d'Ampezzo, Italy.

As a consequence of the pandemic, an extra edition of the World Athletics Indoor Championships originally planned for 2020 will also be held in 2025 in Nanjing, China. It will be the first time since 2003 that the indoor and outdoor events will occur in the same year, before the indoor championships revert to an even-numbered year schedule in 2026.

In multi-sports, the 2025 World Games for non-Olympic disciplines and events took place in Chengdu, China while the 2025 Deaflympics, the premier event for the non-Paralympic disability sport classification of hearing impairment took place in Tokyo, Japan. For student athletes, the 2025 FISA World University Summer Games took place in July in Germany.

== Calendar by month ==
=== January ===
| Date | Sport | Venue/Event | Status | Winner(s) |
|---|---|---|---|---|
| 15 December – 3 | Darts | (England) 2025 PDC World Darts Championship | International | (England) Luke Littler |
| 26 December – 5 | Ice hockey | (Canada) 2025 World Junior Ice Hockey Championships | International | United States |
| 27 December – 5 | Tennis | (Australia) 2025 United Cup | International | United States |
| 28 December – 5 | Cross-country skiing | (Italy) 2024–25 Tour de Ski | International | Men: (Norway) Johannes Høsflot Klæbo; Women: (Norway) Therese Johaug |
| 29 December – 6 | Ski jumping | (Germany) / (Austria) 2024–25 Four Hills Tournament | International | (Austria) Daniel Tschofenig |
| 3–17 | Rally raid | (Saudi Arabia) 2025 Dakar Rally (WRRC #1) | International | Cars: (Saudi Arabia) Yazeed Al-Rajhi; Bikes: (Australia) Daniel Sanders; Challenger: (Argentina) Nicolás Cavigliasso; SSV: (United States) Brock Heger; Trucks: (Czech Republic) Martin Macík |
| 4–12 | Ice hockey | (Finland) 2025 IIHF World Women's U18 Championship | International | Canada |
| 10–12 | Speed skating | (Netherlands) 2025 European Speed Skating Championships | Continental | Netherlands |
| 10–26 | Bowls | (England) 2025 World Indoor Bowls Championship | International | Open: (Scotland) Jason Banks; Women: (Scotland) Julie Forrest |
| 11 | Formula racing | 2025 Mexico City ePrix (FE #2) | International | (United Kingdom) Oliver Rowland ( (Japan) Nissan Formula E Team) |
| 12–19 | Snooker | (England) 2025 Masters (Triple Crown #2) | International | (England) Shaun Murphy |
| 12–26 | Tennis | (Australia) 2025 Australian Open | International | Men: (Italy) Jannik Sinner; Women: (United States) Madison Keys |
| 13–19 | Kho kho | (India) 2025 Kho Kho World Cup | International | Men: India; Women: India |
| 13–23 | Multi-sport | (Italy) 2025 Winter World University Games | International | France |
| 14–18 | Skeleton | (Switzerland) IBSF Junior World Skeleton Championships 2025 | International | Germany |
| 14–2 February | Handball | (Croatia) / (Denmark) / (Norway) 2025 World Men's Handball Championship | International | Denmark |
| 17–19 | Luge | (Austria) FIL World Luge Natural Track Championships 2025 | International | Italy |
| 17–19 | Speed skating | (Germany) 2025 European Short Track Speed Skating Championships | Continental | Italy |
| 18 | Mixed martial arts | (United States) UFC 311: Makhachev vs. Tsarukyan 2 | International | (Russia) Islam Makhachev |
| 18–19 | Luge | (Germany) 2025 FIL European Luge Championships | Continental | Austria |
| 18–2 February | Cricket | (Malaysia) 2025 Under-19 Women's T20 World Cup | International | India |
| 20 | American football | (United States) 2025 College Football Playoff National Championship | Domestic | Ohio State Buckeyes |
| 22–25 | Bobsleigh & Skeleton | (Canada) / (United States) IBSF Pan American Championships 2025 | Continental | Bobsleigh: Canada; Skeleton:United States |
| 22–26 | Biathlon | (Germany) 2025 IBU Junior Open European Championships | Continental | Poland |
| 23–26 | Rallying | (Monaco) 2025 Monte Carlo Rally (WRC #1) | International | WRC: (France) Sébastien Ogier & (France) Vincent Landais ( (Japan) Toyota Gazoo Racing WRT); WRC-2: (France) Yohan Rossel & (France) Arnaud Dunand ( (France) PH Sport); WRC-3: (France) Arthur Pelamourges & (France) Bastien Pouget) |
| 23–16 February | Association football | (Venezuela) 2025 South American U-20 Championship | Continental | Brazil |
| 24–26 | Canoe slalom | (Australia) 2025 Oceania Canoe Slalom Championships | Continental | Australia |
| 28–2 February | Figure skating | (Estonia) 2025 European Figure Skating Championships | Continental | Italy |
| 29–2 February | Biathlon | (Italy) 2025 IBU Open European Championships | Continental | Norway |
| 30–2 February | Darts | (England) 2025 PDC World Masters | International | (England) Luke Humphries |
| 30–2 February | Field hockey | (New Zealand) 2025 Men's Junior Oceania Cup (New Zealand) 2025 Women's Junior Oceania Cup | Continental | Men: Australia; Women: Australia |
| 31–2 February | Cyclo-cross | (France) 2025 UCI Cyclo-cross World Championships | International | Men: (Netherlands) Mathieu van der Poel; Women: (Netherlands) Fem van Empel |
| 31–15 March | Rugby union | (France) / (England) / (Republic of Ireland) / (Italy) / (Scotland) / (Wales) 2025 Six Nations Championship | Continental | France |

=== February ===
| Date | Sport | Venue/Event | Status | Winner/s |
|---|---|---|---|---|
| 1–2 | Luge | (Switzerland) 2025 Junior World Luge Championships | International | Germany |
| 2 | American football | (United States) 2025 Pro Bowl Games | Domestic | National Football Conference |
| 2–11 | Para-alpine skiing | (Slovenia) 2025 World Para Alpine Skiing Championships | International | Italy |
| 3–9 | Indoor hockey | (Croatia) 2025 Men's FIH Indoor Hockey World Cup (Croatia) 2025 Women's FIH Indoor Hockey World Cup | International | Men: Germany; Women: Poland |
| 3–15 | Nordic skiing | (Italy) / (United States) 2025 Nordic Junior World Ski Championships | International | Norway |
| 4–16 | Alpine skiing | (Austria) FIS Alpine World Ski Championships 2025 | International | Switzerland |
| 4–29 November | Association football | 2025 Copa Libertadores | Continental | (Brazil) Flamengo |
| 6–8 | Luge | (Canada) 2025 FIL World Luge Championships | International | Germany |
| 7–9 | Speed skating | (Italy) 2025 World Junior Speed Skating Championships | International | Austria |
| 7–14 | Multi-sport | (China) 2025 Asian Winter Games | Continental | China |
| 7–16 | Road bicycle racing Para-cycling | (Thailand) 2025 Asian Road Cycling Championships | Continental | Kazakhstan |
| 8 | Boxing | (United Kingdom) Derek Chisora vs. Otto Wallin | International | (England) Derek Chisora |
| 9 | American football | (United States) Super Bowl LIX | Domestic | (Pennsylvania) Philadelphia Eagles |
| 9 | Mixed martial arts | (Australia) UFC 312: du Plessis vs. Strickland 2 | International | (South Africa) Dricus du Plessis |
| 9–14 | Bobsleigh | (Switzerland) IBSF Para Sport World Championships 2025 | International | (United Kingdom) Corie Mapp |
| 9–16 | Multi-sport | (Georgia (country)) 2025 European Youth Olympic Winter Festival | Continental | Italy |
| 10–16 | Badminton | (Cameroon) 2025 African Badminton Championships | Continental | Algeria |
| 10–16 | Badminton | (New Zealand) 2025 Oceania Badminton Championships | Continental | Australia |
| 10–16 | Bobsleigh | (Germany) IBSF Junior World Bobsleigh Championships 2025 | International | Germany |
| 11–15 | Track cycling | (Australia) 2025 Oceania Track Championships | Continental | New Zealand |
| 11–16 | Badminton | (China) 2025 Badminton Asia Mixed Team Championships | Continental | Indonesia |
| 12–14 | Para-Nordic skiing | (Italy) 2025 World Para Nordic Skiing Championships | International | France |
| 12–16 | Badminton | (Azerbaijan) 2025 European Mixed Team Badminton Championships | Continental | Denmark |
| 12–16 | Track cycling | (Belgium) 2025 UEC European Track Championships | Continental | Netherlands |
| 12–20 | Ice hockey | (Canada) / (United States) 2025 4 Nations Face-Off | International | Canada |
| 12–23 | Biathlon | (Switzerland) Biathlon World Championships 2025 | International | France |
| 12–1 March | Association football | (China) 2025 AFC U-20 Asian Cup | Continental | Australia |
| 13–16 | Badminton | (Mexico) 2025 Pan Am Badminton Championships (Team) | Continental | Canada |
| 13–16 | Rallying | 2025 Rally Sweden (WRC #2) | International | WRC: (United Kingdom) Elfyn Evans & (United Kingdom) Scott Martin ( (Japan) Toyota Gazoo Racing WRT); WRC-2: (Sweden) Oliver Solberg & (United Kingdom) Elliott Edmondson ( (Finland) Printsport); WRC-3: (Australia) Taylor Gill & (Australia) Daniel Brkic ( FIA Rally Star) |
| 14–15 | Formula racing | (Saudi Arabia) 2025 Jeddah ePrix (FE #3/4) | International | Race 1: (Germany) Maximilian Günther ( (United States) DS Penske); Race 2: (United Kingdom) Oliver Rowland ( (Japan) Nissan Formula E Team) |
| 15–16 | Luge | (South Korea) 2025 FIL America-Pacific Luge Championship (South Korea) 2025 FIL Asian Luge Championship | Continental | United States; South Korea |
| 15–16 | Table tennis | (Australia) 2025 ITTF-Oceania Cup | Continental | Men: (Australia) Nicholas Lum; Women: (Australia) Liu Yangzi |
| 15–23 | Rowing | 2025 World Indoor Rowing Championships | International | Finland |
| 16 | Stock car racing | (United States) 2025 Daytona 500 | Domestic | William Byron (Hendrick Motorsports) |
| 16 | Basketball | (United States) 2025 NBA All-Star Game | Domestic | Shaq's OGs |
| 17–23 | Archery | (Turkey) 2025 European Indoor Archery Championships | Continental | Italy |
| 18 | Ice hockey | (Switzerland) 2025 Champions Hockey League Final | Continental | (Switzerland) ZSC Lions |
| 19–23 | Figure skating | (South Korea) 2025 Four Continents Figure Skating Championships | International | Canada |
| 19–23 | Table tennis | (China) 2025 ITTF-ATTU Asian Cup | Continental | Men: (China) Wang Chuqin; Women: (China) Wang Manyu |
| 19–9 March | Cricket | (Pakistan) / (United Arab Emirates) 2025 ICC Champions Trophy | International | India |
| 20–23 | Table tennis | (Switzerland) 2025 Europe Top 16 Cup | Continental | Men: (France) Alexis Lebrun; Women: (Germany) Han Ying |
| 20–27 | Association football | (Argentina) / (Brazil) 2025 Recopa Sudamericana | Continental | (Argentina) Racing |
| 21–23 | Table tennis | (United States) 2025 ITTF Pan American Cup | Continental | Men: (United States) Kanak Jha; Women: (Brazil) Bruna Takahashi |
| 21–27 | Track cycling | (Malaysia) 2025 Asian Track Cycling Championships | Continental | Japan |
| 22 | Boxing | (Saudi Arabia) Artur Beterbiev vs. Dmitry Bivol II | International | (Russia) Dmitry Bivol |
| 22 | Horse racing | (Saudi Arabia) 2025 Saudi Cup | International | Horse: (Japan) Forever Young; Jockey: (Japan) Ryusei Sakai; Trainer: (Japan) Yoshito Yahagi |
| 22–23 | Motorcycle racing | (Australia) 2025 WSBK Australian round | International | R1: (Italy) Nicolò Bulega ( (Italy) Aruba.it Racing – Ducati); SR: (Italy) Nicolò Bulega ( (Italy) Aruba.it Racing – Ducati); R2: (Italy) Nicolò Bulega ( (Italy) Aruba.it Racing – Ducati) |
| 22–23 | Athletics | (Bolivia) 2025 South American Indoor Championships in Athletics | Continental | Brazil |
| 22–2 March | Beach soccer | (Chile) 2025 Copa América of Beach Soccer | Continental | Brazil |
| 22–6 December | Association football | (United States) / (Canada) 2025 Major League Soccer season | Binational | (Florida) Inter Miami CF |
| 25–27 | Table tennis | (Tunisia) 2025 ITTF African Cup | Continental | Men: (Egypt) Omar Assar; Women: (Egypt) Hana Goda |
| 25–1 March | Figure skating | (Hungary) 2025 World Junior Figure Skating Championships | International | Japan |
| 25–2 March | Water polo | (China) 2025 Asian Water Polo Championship | Continental | Japan |
| 25–6 March | Alpine skiing | (Italy) World Junior Alpine Skiing Championships 2025 | International | France |
| 26–1 March | Fencing | (Paraguay) 2025 Pan American Cadets and Juniors Fencing Championships | Continental | United States |
| 26–5 March | Biathlon | (Sweden) Biathlon Junior World Championships 2025 | International | France |
| 26–9 March | Nordic skiing | (Norway) FIS Nordic World Ski Championships 2025 | International | Norway |
| 27–2 March | Speed skating | (Canada) 2025 World Junior Short Track Speed Skating Championships | International | South Korea |
| 27–2 March | Fencing | (Turkey) 2025 European Cadets and Juniors Fencing Championships | Continental | Italy |
| 28 | Endurance racing | 2025 Qatar 1812 km (WEC #1) | International | Hypercar: (Italy) Antonio Fuoco, (Spain) Miguel Molina & (Denmark) Nicklas Nielsen ( (Italy) Ferrari AF Corse); LMGT3: (United Kingdom) Jonny Edgar, (Spain) Daniel Juncadella & (United States) Ben Keating ( (United Kingdom) TF Sport) |

=== March ===
| Date | Sport | Venue/Event | Status | Winner/s |
|---|---|---|---|---|
| 1 | Ice hockey | (United States) 2025 NHL Stadium Series | Domestic | (Ohio) Columbus Blue Jackets |
| 1–2 | Luge | (Latvia) 2025 FIL Junior European Luge Championships | Continental | Germany |
| 1–7 | Shooting | (Croatia) 2025 European Junior Shooting Championships | Continental | Georgia |
| 1–8 | Curling | (Scotland) 2025 World Wheelchair Curling Championship | International | China |
| 1–16 | Association football | (Paraguay) 2025 U-20 Copa Libertadores | Continental | (Brazil) Flamengo |
| 2 | Motorcycle racing | 2025 Thailand motorcycle Grand Prix (MotoGP #1) | International | MotoGP: (Spain) Marc Márquez ( (Italy) Ducati Lenovo Team); Moto2: (Spain) Manuel González ( (Germany) Liqui Moly Dynavolt Intact GP Moto2); Moto3: (Spain) José Antonio Rueda ( (Finland) Red Bull KTM Ajo) |
| 2 | Marathon | (Japan) 2025 Tokyo Marathon (WMM #1) | International | Men: (Kenya) Tadese Takele; Women: (Ethiopia) Sutume Asefa Kebede |
| 2–9 | Ski Mountaineering | (Switzerland) 2025 World Championship of Ski Mountaineering | International | France |
| 5–10 | Para-snowboarding | (Canada) 2025 World Para Snowboard Championships | International | China |
| 5–16 | Tennis | (United States) 2025 Indian Wells Open | International | Men: (United Kingdom) Jack Draper; Women: Mirra Andreeva |
| 6–9 | Athletics | (Netherlands) 2025 European Athletics Indoor Championships | Continental | Netherlands |
| 6–16 | Bobsleigh; Skeleton | (United States) IBSF World Championships 2025 | International | Germany |
| 7–8 | Motorsport | (Australia) 2025 Race of Champions | International | (France) Sébastien Loeb |
| 7–8 | Synchronized skating | (Sweden) 2025 World Junior Synchronized Skating Championships | International | (United States) Teams Elite |
| 7–13 | Shooting | (Croatia) 2025 European 10 m Events Championships | Continental | Czech Republic |
| 7–27 September | Australian football | (Australia) 2025 AFL season | Domestic | |
| 8 | Mixed martial arts | (United States) UFC 313: Pereira vs. Ankalaev | International | (Russia) Magomed Ankalaev |
| 8–14 | Wrestling | (Albania) 2025 European U23 Wrestling Championships | Continental | United World Wrestling |
| 8–15 | Multi-sport | (Italy) 2025 Special Olympics World Winter Games | International | |
| 9–16 | Amateur boxing | (Serbia) 2025 IBA Women's World Boxing Championships | International | Russia |
| 11–16 | Beach soccer | (The Bahamas) 2025 CONCACAF Beach Soccer Championship | Continental | El Salvador |
| 11–16 | Handball | (Bulgaria) 2025 IHF Emerging Nations Championship | International | Great Britain |
| 11–16 | Wheelchair curling | (Scotland) 2025 World Wheelchair Mixed Doubles Curling Championship | International | Japan |
| 13–16 | Golf | (United States) 2025 Players Championship | International | (Northern Ireland) Rory McIlroy |
| 13–16 | Speed skating | (Norway) 2025 World Single Distances Speed Skating Championships | International | Netherlands |
| 14–16 | Speed skating | (China) 2025 World Short Track Speed Skating Championships | International | Canada |
| 15–16 | Athletics | (Cyprus) 2025 European Throwing Cup | Continental | Germany |
| 15–16 | Triathlon | (Australia) 2025 Oceania Triathlon Championships | Continental | Australia |
| 15–23 | Curling | (South Korea) 2025 World Women's Curling Championship | International | Canada |
| 16 | Athletics | (Japan) 2025 Asian Race Walking Championships | Continental | China |
| 16 | Formula racing | (Australia) 2025 Australian Grand Prix (F1 #1) | International | (United Kingdom) Lando Norris ( (United Kingdom) McLaren-Mercedes) |
| 16 | Motorcycle racing | (Argentina) 2025 Argentine motorcycle Grand Prix (MotoGP #2) | International | MotoGP: (Spain) Marc Márquez ( (Italy) Ducati Lenovo Team); Moto2: (United Kingdom) Jake Dixon ( (Germany) Elf Marc VDS Racing Team); Moto3: (Spain) Ángel Piqueras ( (Spain) Frinsa – MT Helmets – MSi) |
| 17–23 | Kabaddi | (England) 2025 Kabaddi World Cup | International | Men: India; Women: India |
| 18–19 | Speed skiing | (France) 2025 FIS Speed Ski World Championships | International | (France) Simon Billy |
| 18–30 | Freestyle skiing Snowboarding | (Switzerland) FIS Freestyle Ski and Snowboarding World Championships 2025 | International | Switzerland |
| 18–30 | Tennis | (United States) 2025 Miami Open | International | Men: (Czech Republic) Jakub Menšík; Women: Aryna Sabalenka |
| 18–7 April | Basketball | (United States) 2025 NCAA Division I men's basketball tournament | Domestic | Florida Gators |
| 18–28 September | Baseball | (United States) 2025 Major League Baseball season | Domestic | |
| 18–1 October | Association football | (United States) 2025 U.S. Open Cup | Domestic | (Tennessee) Nashville SC |
| 19–23 | Telemark skiing | (France) 2025 Telemark World Championships | International | Norway |
| 19–6 April | Basketball | (United States) 2025 NCAA Division I women's basketball tournament | Domestic | (Connecticut) UConn Huskies |
| 20–22 | Wrestling | (American Samoa) 2025 Oceania Wrestling Championships | Continental | American Samoa |
| 20–23 | Association football | (United States) 2025 CONCACAF Nations League Finals | Continental | Mexico |
| 20–23 | Rallying | (Kenya) 2025 Safari Rally (WRC #3) | International | WRC: (United Kingdom) Elfyn Evans & (United Kingdom) Scott Martin ( (Japan) Toyota Gazoo Racing WRT); WRC-2: (United Kingdom) Gus Greensmith & (Sweden) Jonas Andersson; WRC-3: (Kenya) Nikhil Sachania & (Kenya) Deep Patel |
| 20–25 | Sepak takraw | (India) 2025 ISTAF World Cup | Continental | Thailand |
| 20–30 | Beach soccer | (Thailand) 2025 AFC Beach Soccer Asian Cup | Continental | Iran |
| 21–23 | Athletics | (China) 2025 World Athletics Indoor Championships | International | United States |
| 21–23 | Canoe slalom | (United States) 2025 Pan American Canoe Slalom Championships | Continental | United States |
| 22 | Road bicycle racing | (Italy) 2025 Milan–San Remo (Monument #1) (Italy) 2025 Milan–San Remo Women | International | Men: (Netherlands) Mathieu van der Poel ( (Belgium) Alpecin–Deceuninck); Women: (Netherlands) Lorena Wiebes ( (Netherlands) Team SD Worx–Protime) |
| 22–30 | Futsal | (Brazil) 2025 Copa América de Futsal Femenina | Continental | Brazil |
| 22–25 May | Cricket | (India) 2025 Indian Premier League | Domestic | Royal Challenger Bengaluru |
| 22–27 April | Rugby union | (England) / (France) / (Republic of Ireland) / (Italy) / (Scotland) / (Wales) 2025 Women's Six Nations Championship | Continental | England |
| 23 | Formula racing | (China) 2025 Chinese Grand Prix (F1 #2) | International | (Australia) Oscar Piastri ( (United Kingdom) McLaren-Mercedes) |
| 23–30 | Athletics | (United States) 2025 World Masters Athletics Indoor Championships | International | United States |
| 25–30 | Bandy | (Sweden) 2025 Bandy World Championship (Sweden) 2025 Women's Bandy World Championship | International | Men: Sweden; Women: Sweden |
| 25–30 | Figure skating | (United States) 2025 World Figure Skating Championships | International | United States |
| 25–30 | Wrestling | (Jordan) 2025 Asian Wrestling Championships | Continental | Iran |
| 26–30 | 3x3 basketball | (Singapore) 2025 FIBA 3x3 Asia Cup | Continental | Men: Australia; Women: Australia |
| 27–12 April | Association football | (Colombia) 2025 South American U-17 Championship | Continental | Brazil |
| 28–1 June | American football | (United States) 2025 UFL season | Domestic | |
| 29–30 | Motorcycle racing | (Portugal) 2025 WSBK Portuguese round | International | R1: (Turkey) Toprak Razgatlıoğlu ( (Germany) ROKiT BMW Motorrad WorldSBK Team); SR: (Turkey) Toprak Razgatlıoğlu ( (Germany) ROKiT BMW Motorrad WorldSBK Team); R2: (Turkey) Toprak Razgatlıoğlu ( (Germany) ROKiT BMW Motorrad WorldSBK Team) |
| 29–6 April | Curling | (Canada) 2025 World Men's Curling Championship | International | Scotland |
| 30 | Motorcycle racing | (United States) 2025 Motorcycle Grand Prix of the Americas (MotoGP #3) | International | MotoGP: (Italy) Francesco Bagnaia ( (Italy) Ducati Lenovo Team); Moto2: (United Kingdom) Jake Dixon ( (Germany) Elf Marc VDS Racing Team); Moto3: (Spain) José Antonio Rueda ( (Finland) Red Bull KTM Ajo) |
| 30–19 April | Association football | (Morocco) 2025 U-17 Africa Cup of Nations | Continental | Morocco |

=== April ===
| Date | Sport | Venue/Event | Status | Winner/s |
|---|---|---|---|---|
| 1–6 | Track cycling | (Paraguay) 2025 Pan American Track Championships | Continental | United States |
| 2–6 | Equestrian | (Switzerland) 2025 FEI World Cup Finals (show jumping and dressage) | International | Dressage: (United Kingdom) Charlotte Fry; Show jumping: (France) Julien Epaillard |
| 3–20 | Association football | (Saudi Arabia) 2025 AFC U-17 Asian Cup | Continental | Uzbekistan |
| 3–23 | Chess | (China) Women's World Chess Championship 2025 | International | (China) Ju Wenjun |
| 4–5 | Synchronized skating | (Finland) 2025 World Synchronized Skating Championships | International | (Finland) Helsinki Rockettes |
| 5 | Horse racing | (United Arab Emirates) 2025 Dubai World Cup | International | Horse: (United States) Hit Show; Jockey: (France) Florent Geroux; Trainer: (United States) Brad H. Cox |
| 5 | Horse racing | (United Kingdom) 2025 Grand National | International | Horse: (Republic of Ireland) Nick Rockett; Jockey: (Republic of Ireland) Patrick Mullins; Trainer: (Republic of Ireland) Willie Mullins |
| 5–6 | Triathlon | (South Africa) 2025 African Triathlon Championships | Continental | Men: (Morocco) Jawad Abdelmoula; Women: Shanae Williams; Mixed relay: South Africa |
| 6 | Road bicycle racing | (Belgium) 2025 Tour of Flanders (Monument #2) (Belgium) 2025 Tour of Flanders for Women | International | Men: (Slovenia) Tadej Pogačar ( (United Arab Emirates) UAE Team Emirates XRG); Women: (Belgium) Lotte Kopecky ( (Netherlands) Team SD Worx–Protime) |
| 6 | Formula racing | (Japan) 2025 Japanese Grand Prix (F1 #3) | International | (Netherlands) Max Verstappen ( (Austria) Red Bull Racing-Honda RBPT) |
| 6–13 | Tennis | (Monaco) 2025 Monte-Carlo Masters | International | (Spain) Carlos Alcaraz |
| 7–12 | Handball | (Mexico) 2025 Nor.Ca. Women's Handball Championship | Continental | Cuba |
| 7–13 | Wrestling | (Slovakia) 2025 European Wrestling Championships | Continental | Azerbaijan |
| 7–15 | Fencing | (China) 2025 Junior and Cadet Fencing World Championships | International | United States |
| 8–13 | Badminton | (China) 2025 Badminton Asia Championships | Continental | China |
| 8–13 | Badminton | (Denmark) 2025 European Badminton Championships | Continental | France |
| 8–13 | Baseball | (Mexico) 2025 Baseball Champions League Americas | Continental | (Mexico) Diablos Rojos del México |
| 9–13 | Badminton | (Peru) 2025 Pan Am Badminton Championships | Continental | Canada |
| 9–20 | Ice hockey | (Czech Republic) 2025 IIHF Women's World Championship | International | United States |
| 10–12 | Wrestling | (Mexico) 2025 U23 Pan American Wrestling Championships | Continental | United States |
| 10–13 | Golf | (United States) 2025 Masters Tournament | International | (Northern Ireland) Rory McIlroy |
| 11–13 | Endurance racing | 2025 GT World Challenge Asia (Malaysia round #1) | International | R1: (China) Leo Ye Hongli & (China) Yuan Bo ( (China) Origine Motorsport); R2: (Malaysia) Prince Jefri Ibrahim & (United Kingdom) Alexander Sims ( (Malaysia) Johor Motorsports Racing JMR) |
| 12 | Association football | (Solomon Islands) 2025 OFC Men's Champions League final | Continental | (New Zealand) Auckland City |
| 12 | Formula racing | (United States) 2025 Miami ePrix (FE #5) | International | (Germany) Pascal Wehrlein ( (Germany) TAG Heuer Porsche Formula E Team) |
| 12 | Mixed martial arts | (United States) UFC 314: Volkanovski vs. Lopes | International | (Australia) Alexander Volkanovski |
| 12 | Road bicycle racing | (France) 2025 Paris–Roubaix Femmes | International | (France) Pauline Ferrand-Prévot ( (Netherlands) Visma–Lease a Bike) |
| 12–13 | Athletics | (Belgium) 2025 European Running Championships | Continental | France |
| 12–21 | Curling | (Italy) 2025 World Junior Curling Championships | International | Men: Italy; Women: South Korea |
| 12–13 | Motorcycle racing | (Netherlands) 2025 WSBK Dutch round | International | R1: (Italy) Nicolò Bulega ( (Italy) Aruba.it Racing – Ducati); SR: (Turkey) Toprak Razgatlıoğlu ( (Germany) ROKiT BMW Motorrad WorldSBK Team); R2: (Turkey) Toprak Razgatlıoğlu ( (Germany) ROKiT BMW Motorrad WorldSBK Team) |
| 13 | Formula racing | 2025 Bahrain Grand Prix (F1 #4) | International | (Australia) Oscar Piastri ( (United Kingdom) McLaren-Mercedes) |
| 13 | Motorcycle racing | 2025 Qatar motorcycle Grand Prix (MotoGP #4) | International | MotoGP: (Spain) Marc Márquez ( (Italy) Ducati Lenovo Team); Moto2: (Spain) Arón Canet ( (Italy) Fantic Racing Lino Sonego); Moto3: (Spain) Ángel Piqueras ( (Spain) Frinsa – MT Helmets – MSi) |
| 13 | Road bicycle racing | (France) 2025 Paris–Roubaix (Monument #3) | International | (Netherlands) Mathieu van der Poel ( (Belgium) Alpecin–Deceuninck) |
| 13–21 | Weightlifting | (Moldova) 2025 European Weightlifting Championships | Continental | Turkey |
| 15–18 | Athletics | (Saudi Arabia) 2025 Asian U18 Athletics Championships | Continental | China |
| 16–20 | Acrobatic gymnastics | (Luxembourg) 2025 Acrobatic Gymnastics European Championships | Continental | Israel |
| 16–21 | Field hockey | (Netherlands) 2025 Women's Euro Hockey League | Continental | (Netherlands) Den Bosch |
| 17–20 | Figure skating | (Japan) 2025 ISU World Team Trophy in Figure Skating | International | United States |
| 17–21 | Field hockey | (Netherlands) 2025 Men's Euro Hockey League | Continental | (Belgium) Gantoise |
| 18–25 | Field hockey | (Namibia) 2024 Men's Hockey Junior Africa Cup (Namibia) 2024 Women's Hockey Junior Africa Cup | Continental | Men: South Africa; Women: South Africa |
| 19–5 May | Snooker | (England) 2025 World Snooker Championship | International | (China) Zhao Xintong |
| 20 | Endurance racing | (Italy) 2025 6 Hours of Imola (WEC #2) | International | Hypercar: (United Kingdom) James Calado, (Italy) Antonio Giovinazzi & (Italy) Alessandro Pier Guidi ( (Italy) Ferrari AF Corse); LMGT3: (United States) Ryan Hardwick, (Austria) Richard Lietz & (Italy) Riccardo Pera ( (Germany) Manthey 1st Phorm) |
| 20 | Formula racing | (Saudi Arabia) 2025 Saudi Arabian Grand Prix (F1 #5) | International | (Australia) Oscar Piastri ( (United Kingdom) McLaren-Mercedes) |
| 20–26 | Bowls | (Scotland) 2025 World Bowls Indoor Championships | International | Men: (Australia) Jack McShane; Women: (Scotland) Sophie McGrouther |
| 20–27 | Volleyball | (Philippines) 2025 AVC Women's Volleyball Champions League | Continental | (Kazakhstan) Zhetysu |
| 20–28 | Weightlifting | (Mauritius) 2025 African Weightlifting Championships | Continental | Tunisia |
| 21 | Marathon | (United States) 2025 Boston Marathon (WMM #2) | International | Men: (Kenya) John Korir; Women: (Kenya) Sharon Lokedi |
| 21–27 | Wheelchair rugby | (Netherlands) 2025 IWRF European Championships | Continental | France |
| 22–27 | Road bicycle racing | (Uruguay) 2025 Pan American Road Championships | Continental | Colombia |
| 22–30 | Futsal | (Morocco) 2025 Women's Futsal Africa Cup of Nations | Continental | Morocco |
| 22–4 May | Tennis | (Spain) 2025 Madrid Open | International | Men: (Norway) Casper Ruud; Women: Aryna Sabalenka |
| 23–27 | Judo | (Montenegro) 2025 European Judo Championships | Continental | France |
| 23–3 May | Ice hockey | (United States) 2025 IIHF World U18 Championships | International | Canada |
| 24–26 | American football | (United States) 2025 NFL draft | Domestic | Cam Ward ( (Florida) Miami (FL)) |
| 24–27 | Golf | (United States) 2025 Chevron Championship | International | (Japan) Mao Saigo |
| 24–27 | Rallying | (Spain) 2025 Rally Islas Canarias (WRC #4) | International | WRC: (Finland) Kalle Rovanperä & (Finland) Jonne Halttunen ( (Japan) Toyota Gazoo Racing WRT); WRC-2: (France) Yohan Rossel & (France) Arnaud Dunand ( (France) PH Sport); WRC-3: (France) Mattéo Chatillon & (France) Maxence Cornuau |
| 25–27 | Motorcycle racing | 2025 ARRC Thailand round | International | R1: Nakarin Atiratphuvapat ( Honda Racing Thailand); R2: Nakarin Atiratphuvapat ( Honda Racing Thailand) |
| 25–27 | Athletics | (Argentina) 2025 South American Championships in Athletics | Continental | Brazil |
| 25–27 | Judo | (Chile) 2025 Pan American-Oceania Judo Championships | Continental | Brazil |
| 25–27 | Judo | (Thailand) 2025 Asian Judo Championships | Continental | Japan |
| 25–28 | Judo | (Ivory Coast) 2025 African Judo Championships | Continental | Egypt |
| 26 | Boxing | (England) Chris Eubank Jr vs Conor Benn | International | (England) Conor Benn |
| 26–3 May | Curling | (Canada) 2025 World Mixed Doubles Curling Championship | International | Italy |
| 27 | Marathon | (United Kingdom) 2025 London Marathon (WMM #3) | International | Men: (Kenya) Sabastian Sawe; Women: (Ethiopia) Tigst Assefa |
| 27 | Road bicycle racing | (Belgium) 2025 Liège–Bastogne–Liège (Monument #4) (Belgium) 2025 Liège–Bastogne–Liège Femmes | International | Men: (Slovenia) Tadej Pogačar ( (United Arab Emirates) UAE Team Emirates XRG); Women: (Mauritius) Kimberley Le Court ( (Belgium) AG Insurance–Soudal) |
| 27 | Motorcycle racing | (Spain) 2025 Spanish motorcycle Grand Prix (MotoGP #5) | International | MotoGP: (Spain) Álex Márquez ( (Italy) BK8 Gresini Racing MotoGP); Moto2: (Spain) Manuel González ( (Germany) Liqui Moly Dynavolt Intact GP Moto2); Moto3: (Spain) José Antonio Rueda ( (Finland) Red Bull KTM Ajo) |
| 27–4 May | Badminton | (China) 2025 Sudirman Cup | International | China |
| 30–5 May | Weightlifting | (Peru) 2025 World Youth and Junior Weightlifting Championships | International | Youth: Philippines; Junior: China |
| 27–18 May | Association football | (Egypt) 2025 U-20 Africa Cup of Nations | Continental | South Africa |
| 28–4 May | Futsal | (Guatemala) 2025 CONCACAF W Futsal Championship | Continental | Canada |
| 29–4 May | Floorball | (Switzerland) 2025 Men's U-19 World Floorball Championships | International | Finland |
| 29–4 May | Wrestling | (Morocco) 2025 African Wrestling Championships | Continental | Egypt |
| 30–24 May | Association football | (Colombia) 2025 South American U-17 Women's Championship | Continental | Paraguay |

=== May ===
| Date | Sport | Venue/Event | Status | Winner/s |
|---|---|---|---|---|
| 1–11 | Beach soccer | (Seychelles) 2025 FIFA Beach Soccer World Cup | International | Brazil |
| 1–11 | Rugby union | (South Africa) 2025 U20 Rugby Championship | International | New Zealand |
| 2 | Boxing | (United States) Ryan Garcia vs. Rolando Romero | International | (United States) Rolando Romero |
| 2–3 | Rhythmic gymnastics | (Egypt) 2025 African Rhythmic Gymnastics Championships | Continental | Egypt |
| 2–4 | Futsal | (France) 2025 UEFA Futsal Champions League Final Tournament | Continental | (Spain) Palma Futsal |
| 3 | Association football | (Saudi Arabia) 2025 AFC Champions League Elite final | Continental | (Saudi Arabia) Al-Ahli |
| 3 | Horse racing | (United States) 2025 Kentucky Derby (Triple Crown #1) | International | Horse: (United States) Sovereignty; Jockey: (Venezuela) Junior Alvarado; Trainer: (United States) Bill Mott |
| 3–4 | Motorcycle racing | (Italy) 2025 WSBK Italian round | International | R1: (Italy) Nicolò Bulega ( (Italy) Aruba.it Racing – Ducati); SR: (Italy) Nicolò Bulega ( (Italy) Aruba.it Racing – Ducati); R2: (Italy) Nicolò Bulega ( (Italy) Aruba.it Racing – Ducati) |
| 3–4 | Formula racing | 2025 Monaco ePrix (FE #6/7) | International | Race 1: (United Kingdom) Oliver Rowland ( (Japan) Nissan Formula E Team); Race 2: (Switzerland) Sébastien Buemi ( (United Kingdom) Envision Racing) |
| 3–4 | Volleyball | (Turkey) 2025 CEV Women's Champions League Final Four | Continental | (Italy) A. Carraro Imoco Conegliano |
| 4 | Formula racing | (United States) 2025 Miami Grand Prix (F1 #6) | International | (Australia) Oscar Piastri ( (United Kingdom) McLaren-Mercedes) |
| 4–10 | Road bicycle racing | (Spain) 2025 La Vuelta Femenina | International | (Netherlands) Demi Vollering ( (France) FDJ–Suez) |
| 4–17 | Association football | (Faroe Islands) 2025 UEFA Women's Under-17 Championship | Continental | Netherlands |
| 6–11 | Curling | (Canada) 2025 World Junior Mixed Doubles Curling Championship | International | Italy |
| 6–15 | Beach handball | (Oman) 2025 Asian Beach Handball Championship | Continental | Men: Oman; Women: Vietnam |
| 6–17 | Futsal | (China) 2025 AFC Women's Futsal Asian Cup | Continental | Japan |
| 6–18 | Tennis | (Italy) 2025 Italian Open | International | Men: (Spain) Carlos Alcaraz; Women: (Italy) Jasmine Paolini |
| 7–11 | Table tennis | (Slovakia) 2025 European Under-21 Table Tennis Championships | Continental | Romania |
| 7–11 | Karate | (Armenia) 2025 European Karate Championships | Continental | Germany |
| 8–10 | Canoe sprint | (China) 2025 Asian Canoe Sprint Championships | Continental | China |
| 8–11 | Wrestling | (Mexico) 2025 Pan American Wrestling Championships | Continental | United States |
| 9–11 | Endurance racing | 2025 GT World Challenge Asia (Indonesia round #2) | International | R1: (China) Leo Ye Hongli & (China) Yuan Bo ( (China) No. 87 Origine Motorsport); R2: (China) Lu Wei & (Belgium) Alessio Picariello ( (China) No. 4 Origine Motorsport) |
| 9–11 | Basketball | (Greece) 2025 Basketball Champions League Final Four | Continental | (Spain) Unicaja |
| 9–15 | Weightlifting | (China) 2025 Asian Weightlifting Championships | Continental | China |
| 9–18 | Squash | (United States) 2025 Men's World Squash Championship (United States) 2025 Women's World Squash Championship | International | Men: (Egypt) Mostafa Asal; Women: (Egypt) Nour El Sherbini |
| 9–25 | Ice hockey | (Sweden) / (Denmark) 2025 IIHF World Championship | International | United States |
| 9–1 June | Road bicycle racing | (Italy) 2025 Giro d'Italia | International | (United Kingdom) Simon Yates ( (Netherlands) Visma–Lease a Bike) |
| 10 | Endurance racing | (Belgium) 2025 6 Hours of Spa-Francorchamps (WEC #3) | International | Hypercar: (United Kingdom) James Calado, (Italy) Antonio Giovinazzi & (Italy) Alessandro Pier Guidi ( (Italy) Ferrari AF Corse); LMGT3: (France) François Heriau, (United States) Simon Mann & (Italy) Alessio Rovera ( (Italy) Vista AF Corse) |
| 10 | Mixed martial arts | (Canada) UFC 315: Muhammad vs. Della Maddalena | International | (Australia) Jack Della Maddalena |
| 10–11 | Athletics | (China) 2025 World Athletics Relays | International | South Africa |
| 10–17 | Sailing | (China) 2025 ILCA 7 Men's World Championship | International | (Netherlands) Willem Wiersema |
| 10–17 | Sailing | (China) 2025 ILCA 6 Women's World Championship | International | (France) Louise Cervera |
| 11 | Motorcycle racing | (France) 2025 French motorcycle Grand Prix (MotoGP #6) | International | MotoGP: (France) Johann Zarco ( (Monaco) Castrol Honda LCR); Moto2: (Spain) Manuel González ( (Germany) Liqui Moly Dynavolt Intact GP); Moto3: (Spain) José Antonio Rueda ( (Finland) Red Bull KTM Ajo) |
| 11–18 | Volleyball | (Japan) 2025 AVC Men's Volleyball Champions League | Continental | (Qatar) Al Rayyan |
| 13–25 | Aquatic sports | (Colombia) 2025 PanAm Aquatics Championships | Continental | Canada |
| 13–15 | Para-judo | (Kazakhstan) 2025 IBSA Judo World Championships | International | Brazil |
| 15–18 | Canoe slalom | (France) 2025 European Canoe Slalom Championships | Continental | Czech Republic |
| 15–18 | Golf | (United States) 2025 PGA Championship | International | (United States) Scottie Scheffler |
| 15–18 | Rallying | 2025 Rally de Portugal (WRC #5) | International | WRC: (France) Sébastien Ogier & (France) Vincent Landais ( (Japan) Toyota Gazoo Racing WRT); WRC-2: (Sweden) Oliver Solberg & (United Kingdom) Elliott Edmondson ( (Finland) Printsport); WRC-3: (Australia) Taylor Gill & (Australia) Daniel Brkic) |
| 15–18 | Orienteering | (Lithuania) 2025 European MTB Orienteering Championships | Continental | Denmark |
| 15–25 | Rugby union | (Japan) 2025 Asia Rugby Women's Championship | Continental | Japan |
| 16–18 | Rhythmic gymnastics | (Singapore) 2025 Asian Rhythmic Gymnastics Championships | Continental | Uzbekistan |
| 16–18 | Volleyball | (Poland) 2025 CEV Champions League Final Four | Continental | (Italy) Sir Sicoma Monini Perugia |
| 17 | Horse racing | (United States) 2025 Preakness Stakes (Triple Crown #2) | Domestic | Horse: (United States) Journalism; Jockey: (Italy) Umberto Rispoli; Trainer: (United States) Michael W. McCarthy |
| 17–18 | Formula racing | (Japan) 2025 Tokyo ePrix (FE #8/9) | International | Race 1: (Belgium) Stoffel Vandoorne ( (Monaco) Maserati MSG Racing); Race 2: (United Kingdom) Oliver Rowland ( (Japan) Nissan Formula E Team) |
| 17–18 | Motorcycle racing | (Czech Republic) 2025 WSBK Czech round | International | R1: (Turkey) Toprak Razgatlıoğlu ( (Germany) ROKiT BMW Motorrad WorldSBK Team); SR: (Turkey) Toprak Razgatlıoğlu ( (Germany) ROKiT BMW Motorrad WorldSBK Team); R2: (Italy) Nicolò Bulega ( (Italy) Aruba.it Racing – Ducati) |
| 17–25 | Association football | (Morocco) / (Tanzania) 2025 CAF Confederation Cup final | Continental | (Morocco) RS Berkane |
| 17–25 | Table tennis | (Qatar) 2025 World Table Tennis Championships | International | Men: (China) Wang Chuqin; Women: (China) Sun Yingsha |
| 18 | Athletics | (Czech Republic) 2025 European Race Walking Team Championships | Continental | Italy |
| 18 | Formula racing | (Italy) 2025 Emilia Romagna Grand Prix (F1 #7) | International | (Netherlands) Max Verstappen ( (Austria) Red Bull Racing-Honda RBPT) |
| 19–1 June | Association football | (Albania) 2025 UEFA European Under-17 Championship | Continental | Portugal |
| 20–27 | Snooker | (China) 2025 World Women's Snooker Championship | International | (China) Bai Yulu |
| 21 | Association football | (Spain) 2025 UEFA Europa League final | Continental | (England) Tottenham Hotspur |
| 21–1 June | Minifootball | (Azerbaijan) 2025 WMF World Cup | International | Azerbaijan |
| 22–28 | Diving | (Turkey) 2025 European Diving Championships | Continental | Ukraine |
| 23–25 | Basketball | (United Arab Emirates) 2025 EuroLeague Final Four | Continental | (Turkish Basketball Federation) Fenerbahçe Beko |
| 23–25 | Karate | (Uzbekistan) 2025 Asian Karate Championships | Continental | Kazakhstan |
| 24 | Association football | (China) 2025 AFC Women's Champions League final | Continental | (China) Wuhan Jiangda |
| 24 | Association football | (Mexico) 2025 CONCACAF W Champions Cup final | Continental | (United States) Gotham FC |
| 24 | Association football | (Portugal) 2025 UEFA Women's Champions League final | Continental | (England) Arsenal |
| 24 | Athletics | (France) 2025 European 10,000m Cup | Continental | Men: (Republic of Ireland) Efrem Gidey; Women: (Belgium) Jana Van Lent |
| 24 | Rugby union | (Wales) 2025 European Rugby Champions Cup final | Continental | (France) Bordeaux Bègles |
| 24–25 | Rowing | (Poland) 2025 European Rowing U19 Championships | Continental | Italy |
| 24–31 | Para ice hockey | (United States) 2025 World Para Ice Hockey Championships | International | United States |
| 24–1 June | Association football | (South Africa) / (Egypt) 2025 CAF Champions League final | Continental | (Egypt) Pyramids |
| 25 | Formula racing | 2025 Monaco Grand Prix (F1 #8) | International | (United Kingdom) Lando Norris ( (United Kingdom) McLaren-Mercedes) |
| 25 | Motorcycle racing | (United Kingdom) 2025 British motorcycle Grand Prix (MotoGP #7) | International | MotoGP: (Italy) Marco Bezzecchi ( (Italy) Aprilia Racing); Moto2: (Australia) Senna Agius ( (Germany) Liqui Moly Dynavolt Intact GP); Moto3: (Spain) José Antonio Rueda ( (Finland) Red Bull KTM Ajo) |
| 25–1 June | Futsal | (Paraguay) 2025 Copa Libertadores de Futsal | Continental | (Uruguay) Peñarol |
| 25–7 June | Tennis | (France) 2025 French Open | International | Men: (Spain) Carlos Alcaraz; Women: (United States) Coco Gauff |
| 27–31 | Multi-sport | (Andorra) 2025 Games of the Small States of Europe | Continental | Cyprus |
| 26–31 | Artistic gymnastics | (Germany) 2025 European Artistic Gymnastics Championships | Continental | Germany |
| 27–31 | Athletics | (South Korea) 2025 Asian Athletics Championships | Continental | China |
| 28 | Association football | (Poland) 2025 UEFA Conference League final | Continental | (England) Chelsea |
| 28–31 | Open water swimming | (Croatia) 2025 European Open Water Swimming Championships | Continental | Hungary |
| 28–7 June | Nine-pin bowling | (Hungary) 2025 World Team Ninepin Bowling Classic Championships | International | Men: Serbia; Women: Croatia |
| 29–1 June | Golf | (United States) 2025 U.S. Women's Open | International | (Sweden) Maja Stark |
| 29–1 June | Rowing | (Bulgaria) 2025 European Rowing Championships | Continental | Great Britain |
| 29–8 June | Association football | (Costa Rica) 2025 CONCACAF Women's U-20 Championship | Continental | Canada |
| 30–1 June | Rhythmic gymnastics | (Paraguay) 2025 Pan American Rhythmic Gymnastics Championships | Continental | United States |
| 30–1 June | Endurance racing | 2025 GT World Challenge Asia (Thailand round #3) | International | R1: (China) Leo Ye Hongli & (China) Yuan Bo ( (China) Origine Motorsport); R2: |
| 31 | Association football | (Germany) 2025 UEFA Champions League final | Continental | (France) Paris Saint-Germain |
| 31–1 June | Formula racing | (China) 2025 Shanghai ePrix (FE #10/11) | International | Race 1: (Germany) Maximilian Günther ( (United States) DS Penske); Race 2: (New Zealand) Nick Cassidy ( (United Kingdom) Jaguar TCS Racing) |
| 31–1 June | Handball | (Hungary) 2025 Women's EHF Champions League Final Four | Continental | (Hungary) Győri Audi ETO KC |
| 31–1 June | Motorcycle racing | 2025 ARRC Thailand round | International | R1: Azroy Anuar ( Idemitsu Honda Racing Malaysia); R2: Azroy Anuar ( Idemitsu Honda Racing Malaysia) |

=== June ===
| Date | Sport | Venue/Event | Status | Winner/s |
|---|---|---|---|---|
| 1 | Association football | (Mexico) 2025 CONCACAF Champions Cup final | Continental | (Mexico) Cruz Azul |
| 1 | Formula racing | (Spain) 2025 Spanish Grand Prix (F1 #9) | International | (Australia) Oscar Piastri ( (United Kingdom) McLaren-Mercedes) |
| 1 | Triathlon | (Colombia) 2025 Americas Triathlon Championships | Continental | Men: (Chile) Diego Moya; Women: (Brazil) Djenyfer Arnold |
| 1–14 | Seven-a-side football | (France) 2025 Kings World Cup Clubs | International | (Spain) Los Troncos FC |
| 2–5 | Artistic swimming | (Portugal) 2025 European Artistic Swimming Championships | Continental | Spain |
| 2–8 | Basketball | (Mexico) 2025 FIBA U16 AmeriCup | Continental | United States |
| 4–8 | Association football | (Germany) 2025 UEFA Nations League Finals | Continental | Portugal |
| 4–8 | Rhythmic gymnastics | (Estonia) 2025 Rhythmic Gymnastics European Championships | Continental | Ukraine |
| 4–8 | Wildwater canoeing | (Italy) 2025 European Wildwater Championships | Continental | France |
| 5–8 | Canoe marathon | (Portugal) 2025 Canoe Marathon European Championships | Continental | Hungary |
| 5–8 | Gymnastics | (South Korea) 2025 Asian Men's Artistic Gymnastics Championships | Continental | Japan |
| 5–8 | Rallying | (Italy) 2025 Rally Italia Sardegna (WRC #6) | International | WRC: (France) Sébastien Ogier & (France) Vincent Landais ( (Japan) Toyota Gazoo Racing WRT); WRC-2: (Italy) Roberto Daprà & (Italy) Luca Guglielmetti); WRC-3: (Italy) Matteo Fontana & (Italy) Alessandro Arnaboldi) |
| 5–22 | International draughts | (Cameroon) 2025 World Draughts Championship | International | (Netherlands) Jan Groenendijk |
| 6–14 | Rugby union | (Fiji) 2025 Oceania Rugby Women's Championship | Continental | Fiji |
| 7 | Horse racing | (United Kingdom) 2025 Epsom Derby | International | Horse: (Republic of Ireland) Lambourn; Jockey: (Republic of Ireland) Wayne Lordan; Trainer: (Republic of Ireland) Aidan O'Brien |
| 7 | Horse racing | (United States) 2025 Belmont Stakes (Triple Crown #3) | International | Horse: (United States) Sovereignty; Jockey: (Venezuela) Junior Alvarado; Trainer: (United States) William I. Mott |
| 7 | Mixed martial arts | (United States) UFC 316: Dvalishvili vs. O'Malley 2 | International | (Georgia (country)) Merab Dvalishvili |
| 7–11 | Table tennis | (New Zealand) 2025 Oceania Table Tennis Championships | Continental | Australia |
| 7–13 | Basketball | (United Arab Emirates) 2025 Basketball Champions League Asia | Continental | (Japan) Utsunomiya Brex |
| 7–15 | Rugby union | (Madagascar) 2025 Rugby Africa Women's Cup | Continental | South Africa |
| 7–21 | Air sports | (Czech Republic) 2025 World Gliding Championships | International | Poland |
| 8 | Motorcycle racing | 2025 Aragon motorcycle Grand Prix (MotoGP #8) | International | MotoGP: (Spain) Marc Márquez ( (Italy) Ducati Corse); Moto2: (Turkey) Deniz Öncü ( (Finland) Red Bull KTM Ajo); Moto3: (Spain) David Muñoz ( (Germany) Liqui Moly Dynavolt Intact GP) |
| 8–15 | Powerlifting | (Germany) 2025 Classic Powerlifting World Championships | International | United States |
| 9–15 | Wrestling | (North Macedonia) 2025 European U17 Wrestling Championships | Continental | United World Wrestling |
| 11–15 | Cricket | (England) 2025 ICC World Test Championship final | International | South Africa |
| 11–28 | Association football | (Slovakia) 2025 UEFA European Under-21 Championship | Continental | England |
| 12–15 | Darts | (Germany) 2025 PDC World Cup of Darts | International | Northern Ireland |
| 12–15 | Golf | (United States) 2025 U.S. Open | International | (United States) J. J. Spaun |
| 12–15 | Gymnastics | (Panama) 2025 Pan American Artistic Gymnastics Championships | Continental | United States |
| 12–15 | Gymnastics | (South Korea) 2025 Asian Women's Artistic Gymnastics Championships | Continental | Japan |
| 12–20 | Wheelchair basketball | (Brazil) 2025 IWBF Men's U23 Wheelchair Basketball World Championship | International | Germany |
| 13 | Seven-a-side football | (France) 2025 Queens Finalissima | International | (Spain) Las Troncas FC |
| 13–20 | Judo | (Hungary) 2025 World Judo Championships | International | Japan |
| 13–26 | Association football | (Romania) 2025 UEFA European Under-19 Championship | Continental | Netherlands |
| 13–5 July | Rugby union | (Hong Kong) / (South Korea) / (Sri Lanka) / (United Arab Emirates) 2025 Asia Rugby Championship | Continental | Hong Kong |
| 14 | American football | (United States) 2025 UFL championship game | Domestic | (Washington, D.C.) DC Defenders |
| 14 | Basketball | (South Africa) 2025 BAL final | Continental | (Libya) Al Ahli Tripoli |
| 14 | Paratriathlon | (France) 2025 European Triathlon Para Championships | Continental | France |
| 14–15 | Endurance racing | (France) 2025 24 Hours of Le Mans (WEC #4) | International | Hypercar: (United Kingdom) Phil Hanson, (Poland) Robert Kubica & (China) Yifei Ye ( (Italy) AF Corse); LMGT3: (United States) Ryan Hardwick, (Italy) Riccardo Pera & (Austria) Richard Lietz ( (Germany) Manthey 1st Phorm) |
| 14–15 | Handball | (Germany) 2025 EHF Champions League Final Four | Continental | (Germany) SC Magdeburg |
| 14–15 | Motorcycle racing | 2025 WSBK Emilia-Romagna round | International | R1: (Turkey) Toprak Razgatlıoğlu ( (Germany) ROKiT BMW Motorrad WorldSBK Team); SR: (Turkey) Toprak Razgatlıoğlu ( (Germany) ROKiT BMW Motorrad WorldSBK Team); R2: (Turkey) Toprak Razgatlıoğlu ( (Germany) ROKiT BMW Motorrad WorldSBK Team) |
| 14–19 | Fencing | (Italy) 2025 European Fencing Championships | Continental | France |
| 14–21 | Water polo | (Croatia) 2025 World Aquatics Men's U20 Water Polo Championships | International | Spain |
| 14–6 July | Association football | (United States) / (Canada) 2025 CONCACAF Gold Cup | Continental | Mexico |
| 14–13 July | Association football | (United States) 2025 FIFA Club World Cup | International | (England) Chelsea |
| 15 | Formula racing | (Canada) 2025 Canadian Grand Prix (F1 #10) | International | (United Kingdom) George Russell ( (Germany) Mercedes) |
| 15–27 | Association football | (Poland) 2025 UEFA Women's Under-19 Championship | Continental | Spain |
| 16–22 | Canoe freestyle | (Germany) 2025 ICF Canoe Freestyle World Championships | International | Great Britain |
| 16–22 | Basketball | (Mexico) 2025 FIBA U16 Women's AmeriCup | Continental | United States |
| 17–22 | Beach handball | (Tunisia) 2025 IHF Youth Beach Handball World Championship | International | Men: Spain; Women: Spain |
| 17–22 | Fencing | (Indonesia) 2025 Asian Fencing Championships | Continental | Japan |
| 17–24 | Volleyball | (Bahrain) 2025 AVC Men's Volleyball Nations Cup | Continental | Bahrain |
| 18–22 | Rhythmic gymnastics | (Bulgaria) 2025 Junior World Rhythmic Gymnastics Championships | International | Bulgaria |
| 18–29 | Basketball | (Czech Republic) / (Germany) / (Greece) / (Italy) EuroBasket Women 2025 | Continental | Belgium |
| 18–29 | Handball | (Poland) 2025 IHF Men's U21 Handball World Championship | International | Denmark |
| 19–21 | Open water swimming | (Portugal) 2025 European Junior Open Water Swimming Championships | Continental | Hungary |
| 19–22 | Canoe sprint | (Czech Republic) 2025 Canoe Sprint European Championships | Continental | Hungary |
| 22 | Motorcycle racing | (Italy) 2025 Italian motorcycle Grand Prix (MotoGP #9) | International | MotoGP: (Spain) Marc Márquez ( (Italy) Ducati Corse); Moto2: (Spain) Manuel González ( (Germany) Liqui Moly Dynavolt Intact GP); Moto3: (Spain) Máximo Quiles ( (Spain) CFMoto Aspar Team) |
| 23–27 | Squash | (Canada) 2025 Men's PSA Squash Tour Finals (Canada) 2025 Women's PSA Squash Tour Finals | International | Men: (Wales) Joel Makin; Women: (Egypt) Nouran Gohar |
| 23–28 | Softball | (Czech Republic) 2025 European Men's Softball Championship | Continental | Czech Republic |
| 23–29 | 3x3 basketball | (Mongolia) 2025 FIBA 3x3 World Cup | International | Men: Spain; Women: Netherlands |
| 24–29 | Athletics | (Slovenia) / (Spain) 2025 European Athletics Team Championships | Continental | Italy |
| 24–29 | Fencing | (Brazil) 2025 Pan American Fencing Championships | Continental | United States |
| 25–26 | Basketball | (United States) 2025 NBA draft | Domestic | (United States) Cooper Flagg ( (North Carolina) Duke) |
| 25–29 | Fencing | (Nigeria) 2025 African Fencing Championships | Continental | Egypt |
| 25–29 | Modern pentathlon | (Hungary) 2025 World Junior Modern Pentathlon Championships | International | Egypt |
| 26–28 | Swimming | (Slovakia) 2025 European U-23 Swimming Championships | Continental | Poland |
| 26–29 | Judo | (North Macedonia) 2025 European Cadet Judo Championships | Continental | International Judo Federation |
| 26–29 | Rallying | (Greece) 2025 Acropolis Rally (WRC #7) | International | WRC: (Estonia) Ott Tänak & (Estonia) Martin Järveoja ( (South Korea) Hyundai Shell Mobis WRT); WRC-2: (Sweden) Oliver Solberg & (Sweden) Elliott Edmondson); WRC-3: (Turkey) Ali Türkkan & (Turkey) Oytun Albayrak) |
| 26–4 July | Orienteering | (Italy) 2025 Junior World Orienteering Championships | International | Czech Republic |
| 27–28 | Ice hockey | (United States) 2025 NHL entry draft | Domestic | (Canada) Matthew Schaefer |
| 27–5 July | Softball | (Italy) 2025 U-15 Women's Softball World Cup | International | Japan |
| 27–5 July | Softball | (Colombia) 2025 Women's Softball Pan American Championship | Continental | Canada |
| 28 | Mixed martial arts | (United States) UFC 317: Topuria vs. Oliveira | International | (Georgia (country)) Ilia Topuria |
| 28–6 July | Basketball | (Chile) 2025 FIBA Women's AmeriCup | Continental | United States |
| 28–6 July | Basketball | (Switzerland) 2025 FIBA Under-19 Basketball World Cup | International | United States |
| 29 | Formula racing | (Austria) 2025 Austrian Grand Prix (F1 #11) | International | (United Kingdom) Lando Norris ( (United Kingdom) McLaren-Mercedes) |
| 29 | Motorcycle racing | (Netherlands) 2025 Dutch TT (MotoGP #10) | International | MotoGP: (Spain) Marc Márquez ( (Italy) Ducati Corse); Moto2: (Brazil) Diogo Moreira ( (Italy) Italtrans Racing Team); Moto3: (Spain) José Antonio Rueda ( (Finland) Red Bull KTM Ajo) |
| 29–9 July | Multi-sport | (Palau) 2025 Pacific Mini Games | Continental | French Polynesia |
| 29–19 July | Rugby union | (Italy) 2025 World Rugby U20 Championship | International | South Africa |
| 30–6 July | Wrestling | (Italy) 2025 European U20 Wrestling Championships | Continental | Men's freestyle: Georgia; Men's Greco-Roman: Georgia; Women's freestyle: Ukraine |
| 30–13 July | Tennis | (United Kingdom) 2025 Wimbledon Championships | International | Men: (Italy) Jannik Sinner; Women: (Poland) Iga Świątek |
| 30–6 July | Para-archery | (China) 2025 Asian Para Archery Championships | Continental | China |

=== July ===
| Date | Sport | Venue/Event | Status | Winner/s |
|---|---|---|---|---|
| 1–6 | Swimming | (Slovakia) 2025 European Junior Swimming Championships | Continental | Great Britain |
| 2–5 | Weightlifting | (Palau) 2025 Oceania Weightlifting Championships | Continental | Samoa |
| 2–13 | Volleyball | (Croatia) / (Serbia) 2025 FIVB Volleyball Girls' U19 World Championship | International | Bulgaria |
| 2–13 | Volleyball | (Albania) / (Kosovo) 2025 Women's U16 European Volleyball Championship | Continental | Poland |
| 2–27 | Association football | (Switzerland) UEFA Women's Euro 2025 | Continental | England |
| 3–6 | Canoe sprint | (Romania) 2025 Junior and U23 Canoe Sprint European Championships | Continental | Hungary |
| 4–19 | Association football | (Fiji) 2025 OFC Women's Nations Cup | Continental | Solomon Islands |
| 5–13 | Basketball | (Spain) 2025 FIBA U18 Women's EuroBasket | Continental | Spain |
| 5–26 | Association football | (Morocco) 2024 Women's Africa Cup of Nations | Continental | Nigeria |
| 5–27 | Road bicycle racing | 2025 Tour de France | International | (Slovenia) Tadej Pogačar ( (United Arab Emirates) UAE Team Emirates XRG) |
| 5–29 | Chess | (Georgia (country)) Women's Chess World Cup 2025 | International | (India) Divya Deshmukh |
| 6 | Formula racing | (United Kingdom) 2025 British Grand Prix (F1 #12) | International | (United Kingdom) Lando Norris ( (United Kingdom) McLaren-Mercedes) |
| 6–13 | Road bicycle racing | (Italy) 2025 Giro d'Italia Women | International | (Italy) Elisa Longo Borghini ( (United Arab Emirates) UAE Team ADQ) |
| 7–12 | Orienteering | (Finland) 2025 World Orienteering Championships | International | Norway |
| 8–13 | Beach handball | (Turkey) 2025 European Beach Handball Championship | Continental | Men: Germany; Women: Spain |
| 8–13 | Canoe slalom | (France) 2025 ICF World Junior and U23 Canoe Slalom Championships | International | Czech Republic |
| 8–13 | Softball | (Canada) 2025 Men's Softball World Cup | International | Venezuela |
| 8–16 | Wheelchair rugby | (Brazil) 2025 IWRF Americas Championship | Continental | United States |
| 8–19 | Rugby union | (Uganda) 2025 Rugby Africa Cup | Continental | Zimbabwe |
| 8–24 August | Esports | (Saudi Arabia) 2025 Esports World Cup | International | Club Championship: (Saudi Arabia) Team Falcons |
| 9–20 | Handball | (Montenegro) 2025 European Women's U-19 Handball Championship | Continental | Germany |
| 10–13 | BMX racing | (Latvia) 2025 BMX Racing European Championships | Continental | Men: (France) Mathis Ragot Richard; Women: (United Kingdom) Beth Shriever |
| 10–13 | Golf | (France) 2025 Evian Championship | International | (Australia) Grace Kim |
| 10–18 | Badminton | (Guatemala) 2025 Pan Am Junior Badminton Championships | Continental | United States |
| 10–19 | Lacrosse | (Poland) 2025 European Lacrosse Championship | Continental | Israel |
| 11–13 | Endurance racing | (Japan) 2025 GT World Challenge Asia (Fuji Speedway round #4) | International | R1: (China) Leo Ye Hongli & (China) Yuan Bo ( (China) No. 87 Origine Motorsport); R2: (United Kingdom) Ben Green & (Malaysia) Prince Jefri Ibrahim ( (Malaysia) Johor Motorsports Racing JMR) |
| 11–2 August | Association football | (Ecuador) 2025 Copa América Femenina | Continental | Brazil |
| 11–3 August | Aquatic sports | (Singapore) 2025 World Aquatics Championships | International | China |
| 12–13 | Motorcycle racing | (United Kingdom) 2025 WSBK British round | International | R1: (Turkey) Toprak Razgatlıoğlu ( (Germany) ROKiT BMW Motorrad WorldSBK Team); SR: (Turkey) Toprak Razgatlıoğlu ( (Germany) ROKiT BMW Motorrad WorldSBK Team); R2: (Turkey) Toprak Razgatlıoğlu ( (Germany) ROKiT BMW Motorrad WorldSBK Team) |
| 12–13 | Motorcycle racing | 2025 ARRC Japan round | International | R1: (Japan) Keito Abe; R2: (Malaysia) Hafizh Syahrin |
| 12–18 | Multi-sport | (Orkney) 2025 Island Games | International | Faroe Islands |
| 12–19 | Volleyball | (Thailand) 2025 Asian Men's U16 Volleyball Championship | Continental | Pakistan |
| 12–20 | Basketball | (Czech Republic) 2025 FIBA Under-19 Women's Basketball World Cup | International | United States |
| 12–20 | Basketball | (Greece) 2025 FIBA U20 EuroBasket | Continental | Italy |
| 12–20 | Handball | (Georgia (country)) 2025 Women's U-19 EHF Championship | Continental | Ukraine |
| 13 | Endurance racing | (Brazil) 2025 6 Hours of São Paulo (WEC #5) | International | Hypercar: (United Kingdom) Alex Lynn, (France) Norman Nato & (United Kingdom) Will Stevens ( (United States) Cadillac Hertz Team Jota); LMGT3: (Argentina) José María López, (Austria) Clemens Schmid & (Romania) Răzvan Umbrărescu ( (France) Akkodis ASP Team) |
| 13 | Motorcycle racing | (Germany) 2025 German motorcycle Grand Prix (MotoGP #11) | International | MotoGP: (Spain) Marc Márquez ( (Italy) Ducati Lenovo Team); Moto2: (Turkey) Deniz Öncü ( (Finland) Red Bull KTM Ajo); Moto3: (Spain) David Muñoz ( (Germany) Liqui Moly Dynavolt Intact GP) |
| 13–18 | Weightlifting | (Colombia) 2025 Pan American Weightlifting Championships | Continental | United States |
| 13–19 | Field hockey | (France) 2025 Boys' EuroHockey U18 Championship (France) 2025 Girls' EuroHockey U18 Championship | Continental | Men: Germany; Women: Netherlands |
| 13–20 | Basketball | (China) 2025 FIBA Women's Asia Cup | Continental | Australia |
| 14–20 | Softball | (China) 2025 Women's Softball Asia Cup | Continental | Japan |
| 15 | Baseball | (United States) 2025 Major League Baseball All-Star Game | Domestic | National League |
| 15–19 | Baseball | (Italy) 2025 U-15 Baseball European Championship | Continental | Germany |
| 15–20 | Track cycling | (Portugal) 2025 UEC European Track Championships (under-23 & junior) | Continental | Great Britain |
| 15–29 | Association football | (Indonesia) 2025 ASEAN U-23 Championship | Continental | Vietnam |
| 16–20 | Equestrian | (Spain) 2025 European Show Jumping Championships | Continental | Individual: (Germany) Richard Vogel; Team: Belgium |
| 16–27 | Multi-sport | (Germany) 2025 Summer World University Games | International | Japan |
| 17–20 | Athletics | (Norway) 2025 European Athletics U23 Championships | Continental | Germany |
| 17–20 | Golf | (Northern Ireland) 2025 Open Championship | International | (United States) Scottie Scheffler |
| 17–20 | Rallying | 2025 Rally Estonia (WRC #8) | International | WRC: (Sweden) Oliver Solberg & (United Kingdom) Elliott Edmondson ( (Japan) Toyota Gazoo Racing WRT); WRC-2: (Estonia) Robert Virves & (Estonia) Jakko Viilo ( (Germany) Toksport WRT); WRC-3: (Japan) Takumi Matsushita & (Finland) Pekka Kelander ( (Japan) Toyota Gazoo Racing WRT NG) |
| 18–26 | Handball | (China) 2025 Asian Women's Youth Handball Championship | Continental | China |
| 18–27 | Badminton | (Indonesia) 2025 Badminton Asia Junior Championships | Continental | China |
| 19 | Boxing | (United States) Manny Pacquiao vs. Mario Barrios | International | Draw |
| 19 | Boxing | (United Kingdom) Oleksandr Usyk vs. Daniel Dubois II | International | (Ukraine) Oleksandr Usyk |
| 19 | Mixed martial arts | (United States) UFC 318: Holloway vs. Poirier 3 | International | (United States) Max Holloway |
| 19–27 | Darts | (England) 2025 World Matchplay | International | (England) Luke Littler |
| 20 | Motorcycle racing | 2025 Czech Republic motorcycle Grand Prix (MotoGP #12) | International | MotoGP: (Spain) Marc Márquez ( (Italy) Ducati Lenovo Team); Moto2: (United States) Joe Roberts ( (United States) OnlyFans American Racing Team); Moto3: (Spain) José Antonio Rueda ( (Finland) Red Bull KTM Ajo) |
| 20–26 | Multi-sport | (North Macedonia) 2025 European Youth Summer Olympic Festival | Continental | Italy |
| 21–27 | Modern pentathlon | (Spain) 2025 European Modern Pentathlon Championships | Continental | Hungary |
| 21–28 | European Para Youth Games | (Turkey) 2025 European Para Youth Games | Continental | Turkey |
| 22–30 | Fencing | (Georgia (country)) 2025 World Fencing Championships | International | France |
| 23–27 | Canoe sprint | (Portugal) 2025 ICF World Junior and U23 Canoe Sprint Championships | International | Hungary |
| 23–27 | Rowing | (Poland) 2025 World Rowing U23 Championships | International | Great Britain |
| 23–3 August | Volleyball | (Armenia) 2025 CEV U16 Volleyball European Championship | Continental | Italy |
| 23–7 August | Shooting | (France) 2025 European Shooting Championships | Continental | France |
| 24–3 August | Volleyball | (Uzbekistan) 2025 FIVB Volleyball Boys' U19 World Championship | International | France |
| 24–3 August | Field hockey | (Uruguay) 2025 Men's Pan American Cup (Uruguay) 2025 Women's Pan American Cup | Continental | Men: Argentina; Women: Argentina |
| 25–3 August | Baseball | (Chinese Taipei) 2025 U-12 Baseball World Cup | International | United States |
| 25–3 August | Basketball | (Ivory Coast) 2025 Women's Afrobasket | Continental | Nigeria |
| 26–27 | Motorcycle racing | (Hungary) 2025 WSBK Hungarian round | International | R1: (Turkey) Toprak Razgatlıoğlu ( (Germany) ROKiT BMW Motorrad WorldSBK Team); SR: (Turkey) Toprak Razgatlıoğlu ( (Germany) ROKiT BMW Motorrad WorldSBK Team); R2: (Turkey) Toprak Razgatlıoğlu ( (Germany) ROKiT BMW Motorrad WorldSBK Team) |
| 26–3 August | Basketball | (Serbia) 2025 FIBA U18 EuroBasket | Continental | Spain |
| 26–3 August | Road bicycle racing | 2025 Tour de France Femmes | International | (France) Pauline Ferrand-Prévot ( (Netherlands) Visma–Lease a Bike) |
| 26–9 August | Air sports | (Czech Republic) 2025 Women's World Gliding Championships | International | Czech Republic |
| 26–9 August | Air sports | (Hungary) 2025 European Gliding Championships | Continental | France |
| 27 | Darts | (England) 2025 Women's World Matchplay | International | (England) Lisa Ashton |
| 27 | Formula racing | (Belgium) 2025 Belgian Grand Prix (F1 #13) | International | (Australia) Oscar Piastri ( (United Kingdom) McLaren-Mercedes) |
| 27–7 August | Tennis | (Canada) 2025 Canadian Open | International | Men: (United States) Ben Shelton; Women: (Canada) Victoria Mboko |
| 28–3 August | BMX racing | (Denmark) 2025 UCI BMX World Championships | International | Men: (France) Arthur Pilard; Women: (United Kingdom) Beth Shriever |
| 28–3 August | Sport climbing | (Finland) 2025 IFSC Climbing World Youth Championships | International | Japan |
| 28–3 August | Wrestling | (Greece) 2025 U17 World Wrestling Championships | International | United States |
| 30–3 August | Beach volleyball | (Germany) 2025 European Beach Volleyball Championships | Continental | Men: Norway; Women: Ukraine |
| 30–3 August | Canoe slalom | (Slovenia) 2025 European Junior and U23 Canoe Slalom Championships | Continental | Czech Republic |
| 30–10 August | Handball | (Montenegro) 2025 European Women's U-17 Handball Championship | Continental | Slovakia |
| 31–3 August | Golf | (Wales) 2025 Women's British Open | International | (Japan) Miyū Yamashita |
| 31–3 August | Rallying | 2025 Rally Finland (WRC #9) | International | WRC: (Finland) Kalle Rovanperä & (Finland) Jonne Halttunen ( (Japan) Toyota Gazoo Racing WRT); WRC-2: (Finland) Roope Korhonen & (Finland) Anssi Viinikka; WRC-3: (Australia) Taylor Gill & (Australia) Daniel Brkic ( FIA Rally Star) |

=== August ===
| Date | Sport | Venue/Event | Status | Winner/s |
|---|---|---|---|---|
| 1–3 | Endurance racing | (Japan) 2025 Suzuka 8 Hours Endurance Race (EWC) | International | (Japan) Takumi Takahashi & (France) Johann Zarco ( (Japan) Honda Team HRC) |
| 1–14 | Association football | (Samoa) 2025 OFC U-16 Women's Championship | Continental | New Zealand |
| 2–10 | Association football | (Aruba) / (Costa Rica) / (Curaçao) 2025 CONCACAF Boys' Under-15 Championship | Continental | Mexico |
| 2–10 | Basketball | (Portugal) 2025 FIBA U20 Women's EuroBasket | Continental | Spain |
| 2–30 | Association football | (Kenya) / (Tanzania) / (Uganda) 2024 African Nations Championship | Continental | Morocco |
| 3 | Formula racing | (Hungary) 2025 Hungarian Grand Prix (F1 #14) | International | (United Kingdom) Lando Norris ( (United Kingdom) McLaren-Mercedes) |
| 3–10 | Volleyball | (Mexico) 2025 Women's Pan-American Volleyball Cup | Continental | Dominican Republic |
| 4–10 | Handball | (Kosovo) 2025 Women's U-17 EHF Championship | Continental | Italy |
| 5–9 | Baseball | (Czech Republic) 2025 European Under-23 Baseball Championship | Continental | Great Britain |
| 5–17 | Basketball | (Saudi Arabia) 2025 FIBA Asia Cup | Continental | Australia |
| 6–10 | Rowing | (Lithuania) 2025 World Rowing Junior Championships | International | Great Britain |
| 6–17 | Handball | (Egypt) 2025 IHF Men's U19 Handball World Championship | International | Germany |
| 7–10 | Athletics | (Finland) 2025 European Athletics U20 Championships | Continental | Italy |
| 7–17 | Multi-sport | (China) 2025 World Games | International | China |
| 7–17 | Volleyball | (Indonesia) 2025 FIVB Volleyball Women's U21 World Championship | International | Italy |
| 7–18 | Tennis | (United States) 2025 Cincinnati Open | International | Men: (Spain) Carlos Alcaraz; Women: (Poland) Iga Świątek |
| 7–24 | Golf | (United States) 2025 FedEx Cup Playoffs | International | St. Jude Championship: (England) Justin Rose; BMW Championship: (United States) Scottie Scheffler; Tour Championship: (England) Tommy Fleetwood |
| 8–16 | Basketball | (Georgia (country)) 2025 FIBA U16 EuroBasket | Continental | Serbia |
| 8–16 | Field hockey | (Germany) 2025 Men's EuroHockey Championship (Germany) 2025 Women's EuroHockey Championship | Continental | Men: Germany; Women: Netherlands |
| 9–23 | Multi-sport | (Paraguay) 2025 Junior Pan American Games | Continental | Brazil |
| 10–16 | Water polo | (Brazil) 2025 World Aquatics Women's U20 Water Polo Championships | International | United States |
| 11–17 | Orienteering | (Poland) 2025 World MTB Orienteering Championships | International | Czech Republic |
| 12–24 | Basketball | (Angola) FIBA AfroBasket 2025 | Continental | Angola |
| 13 | Association football | (Italy) 2025 UEFA Super Cup | Continental | (France) Paris Saint-Germain |
| 14–17 | Baseball | (Czech Republic) 2025 Women's European Baseball Championship | Continental | Great Britain |
| 14–17 | Canoe slalom | (China) 2025 Asian Canoe Slalom Championships | Continental | China |
| 14–24 | Baseball | (United States) 2025 Little League World Series | Domestic | (Chinese Taipei) Tung-Yuan Little League |
| 15–17 | Athletics | (The Bahamas) 2025 NACAC Championships | Continental | United States |
| 15–23 | Basketball | (Romania) 2025 FIBA U16 Women's EuroBasket | Continental | Spain |
| 15–24 | Lacrosse | (South Korea) 2025 World Lacrosse Men's U-20 Championship | International | Canada |
| 15–30 | Association football | (Solomon Islands) 2025 OFC U-16 Men's Championship | Continental | New Zealand |
| 16 | Mixed martial arts | (United States) UFC 319: du Plessis vs. Chimaev | International | (United Arab Emirates) Khamzat Chimaev |
| 16–30 | Shooting | (Kazakhstan) 2025 Asian Shooting Championships | Continental | China |
| 16–4 October | Rugby union | (Argentina) / (Australia) / (New Zealand) / (South Africa) 2025 Rugby Championship | International | South Africa |
| 17 | Motorcycle racing | (Austria) 2025 Austrian motorcycle Grand Prix (MotoGP #13) | International | MotoGP: (Spain) Marc Márquez ( (Italy) Ducati Lenovo Team); Moto2: (Brazil) Diogo Moreira ( (Italy) Italtrans Racing Team); Moto3: (Spain) Ángel Piqueras ( (Spain) Frinsa – MT Helmets – MSi) |
| 17–23 | Baseball | (Taiwan) 2025 U-15 Asian Baseball Championship | Continental | Chinese Taipei |
| 17–24 | Archery | (Canada) 2025 World Archery Youth Championships | International | South Korea |
| 17–24 | Wrestling | (Bulgaria) 2025 U20 World Wrestling Championships | International | United States |
| 18–24 | Water polo | (Romania) 2025 Men's European U-18 Water Polo Championship | Continental | Montenegro |
| 19–23 | Modern pentathlon | (Lithuania) 2025 World U19 Modern Pentathlon Championships | International | Egypt |
| 19–24 | Swimming | (Romania) 2025 World Aquatics Junior Swimming Championships | International | United States |
| 20–24 | Canoe sprint Paracanoe | (Italy) 2025 ICF Canoe Sprint World Championships | International | Hungary |
| 20–24 | Rhythmic gymnastics | (Brazil) 2025 Rhythmic Gymnastics World Championships | International | Germany |
| 20–24 | Track cycling | (Netherlands) 2025 UCI Junior Track Cycling World Championships | International | Italy |
| 20–29 | Handball | (Uzbekistan) 2025 Asian Women's Junior Handball Championship | Continental | Japan |
| 21–31 | Volleyball | (China) 2025 FIVB Volleyball Men's U21 World Championship | International | Iran |
| 22–31 | Basketball | (Nicaragua) 2025 FIBA AmeriCup | Continental | Brazil |
| 22–7 September | Volleyball | (Thailand) 2025 FIVB Women's Volleyball World Championship | International | Italy |
| 22–27 September | Rugby union | (England) 2025 Women's Rugby World Cup | International | England |
| 23–14 September | Road bicycle racing | (Spain) 2025 Vuelta a España | International | (Denmark) Jonas Vingegaard ( (Netherlands) Visma–Lease a Bike) |
| 23–20 September | Rugby union | (United States) 2025 World Rugby Pacific Nations Cup | Regional | Fiji |
| 24 | Motorcycle racing | (Hungary) 2025 Hungarian motorcycle Grand Prix (MotoGP #14) | International | MotoGP: (Spain) Marc Márquez ( (Italy) Ducati Lenovo Team); Moto2: (Colombia) David Alonso ( (Spain) CFMoto Aspar Team); Moto3: (Spain) Máximo Quiles ( (Spain) CFMoto Aspar Team) |
| 24–30 | Weightlifting | (India) 2025 Commonwealth Weightlifting Championships | International | India |
| 24–7 September | Tennis | (United States) 2025 US Open | International | Men: (Spain) Carlos Alcaraz; Women: Aryna Sabalenka |
| 25–31 | Badminton | (France) 2025 BWF World Championships | International | Men: (China) Shi Yuqi; Women: (Japan) Akane Yamaguchi |
| 26–30 | Modern pentathlon | (Lithuania) 2025 World Modern Pentathlon Championships | International | Egypt |
| 26–31 | Equestrian | (France) 2025 FEI European Dressage Championships | Continental | Belgium |
| 26–31 | Volleyball | (Mexico) 2025 Men's Pan-American Volleyball Cup | Continental | Venezuela |
| 27–31 | Judo | (Bulgaria) 2025 World Judo Cadets Championships | International | Uzbekistan |
| 27–31 | Orienteering | (Belgium) 2025 European Orienteering Championships | Continental | Norway |
| 27–14 September | Basketball | (Cyprus) / (Poland) / (Finland) / (Latvia) EuroBasket 2025 | Continental | Germany |
| 28–31 | Canoe sprint Paracanoe | (Paraguay) 2025 Pan American Canoe Sprint Championships | Continental | Argentina |
| 28–31 | Para-cycling | (Belgium) 2025 UCI Para-cycling Road World Championships | International | France |
| 28–31 | Rallying | 2025 Rally del Paraguay (WRC #10) | International | WRC: (France) Sébastien Ogier & (France) Vincent Landais ( (Japan) Toyota Gazoo Racing WRT); WRC-2: (Sweden) Oliver Solberg & (United Kingdom) Elliott Edmondson ( (Finland) Printsport); WRC-3: (Italy) Matteo Fontana & (Italy) Alessandro Arnaboldi |
| 29–31 | Endurance racing | (Japan) 2025 GT World Challenge Asia (Okayama round #5) | International | R1: (China) Deng Yi & (China) Luo Kailuo ( (China) Winhere Harmony Racing); R2: (Denmark) Bastian Buus & (China) Lu Wei ( (China) Origine Motorsport) |
| 29–7 September | Field hockey | (India) 2025 Men's Hockey Asia Cup | Continental | India |
| 30 | Wrestling | (United States) RAF 01: Hendrickson vs. Elders | International | (United States) Wyatt Hendrickson |
| 30–31 | Triathlon | (Turkey) 2025 European Triathlon Championships | Continental | Men: (Switzerland) Max Studer; Women: (Belgium) Jolien Vermeylen |
| 30–31 | Triathlon | (Turkey) 2025 Asia Triathlon Championships | Continental | Men: (Japan) Takumi Hojo; Women: (Japan) Yuko Takahashi |
| 30–14 September | Mountain biking | (Switzerland) 2025 UCI Mountain Bike World Championships | International | France |
| 30–13 December | American football | (United States) 2025 NCAA Division I FBS football season | Domestic | |
| 30–31 | Motorcycle racing | 2025 ARRC Indonesia round | International | R1: (Malaysia) Hafizh Syahrin; R2: (Malaysia) Azlan Shah |
| 31 | Formula racing | (Netherlands) 2025 Dutch Grand Prix (F1 #15) | International | (Australia) Oscar Piastri ( (United Kingdom) McLaren-Mercedes) |
| 31 | Marathon | (Australia) 2025 Sydney Marathon (WMM #4) | International | Men: (Ethiopia) Hailemaryam Kiros; Women: (Netherlands) Sifan Hassan |
| 31–7 September | Basketball | (Mongolia) 2025 FIBA U16 Asia Cup | Continental | Australia |
| 31–7 September | Water polo | (Malta) 2025 Women's European U-18 Water Polo Championship | Continental | Spain |
| 31–7 September | Wushu | (Brazil) 2025 World Wushu Championships | International | China |
| 31–13 September | Air sports | (Brazil) 2025 World Paragliding Championships | International | France |

=== September ===
| Date | Sport | Venue/Event | Status | Winner/s |
|---|---|---|---|---|
| 2 | Surfing | (Fiji) 2025 World Surf League Finals | International | Men: (Brazil) Yago Dora; Women: (Australia) Molly Picklum |
| 2–7 | Wheelchair fencing | (South Korea) 2025 Wheelchair Fencing World Championships | International | China |
| 2–7 | Squash | (England) 2025 London Squash Classic (Gold #1) | International | Men: (New Zealand) Paul Coll; Women: (Egypt) Amina Orfi |
| 2–14 | Basketball | (Rwanda) 2025 FIBA U16 AfroBasket (Rwanda) 2025 FIBA U16 Women's AfroBasket | Continental | Men: Ivory Coast; Women: Egypt |
| 3–7 | Para-equestrian | (Netherlands) 2025 European Para-Dressage Championship | Continental | Germany |
| 3–15 | Chess | (Uzbekistan) FIDE Grand Swiss Tournament 2025 (Uzbekistan) FIDE Women's Grand Swiss Tournament 2025 | International | Open: (Netherlands) Anish Giri; Women: (India) Vaishali Rameshbabu |
| 4–7 | Canoe marathon | (Hungary) 2025 ICF Canoe Marathon World Championships | International | Hungary |
| 4–7 | Field hockey | (Australia) 2025 Men's Oceania Cup (Australia) 2025 Women's Oceania Cup | Continental | Men: Australia; Women: New Zealand |
| 4–7 | Judo | (Slovakia) 2025 European Junior Judo Championships | Continental | Italy |
| 4–14 | Boxing | (United Kingdom) 2025 World Boxing Championships | International | Kazakhstan |
| 4–4 January | American football | (United States) 2025 NFL season | Domestic | |
| 5–7 | 3x3 basketball | (Denmark) 2025 FIBA 3x3 Europe Cup | Continental | Men: Lithuania; Women: Netherlands |
| 5–12 | Archery | (South Korea) 2025 World Archery Championships | International | South Korea |
| 5–14 | Baseball | (Japan) 2025 U-18 Baseball World Cup | International | United States |
| 5–14 | Field hockey | (China) 2025 Women's Hockey Asia Cup | Continental | China |
| 5–14 | Surfing | (El Salvador) 2025 ISA World Surfing Games | International | Men: (Australia) Dane Henry; Women: (Spain) Janire Etxabarri |
| 6–7 | Rowing | (Czech Republic) 2025 European Rowing U23 Championships | Continental | Romania |
| 6–7 | Motorcycle racing | (France) 2025 WSBK French round | International | R1: (Turkey) Toprak Razgatlıoğlu ( (Germany) ROKiT BMW Motorrad WorldSBK Team); SR: (Turkey) Toprak Razgatlıoğlu ( (Germany) ROKiT BMW Motorrad WorldSBK Team); R2: (Turkey) Toprak Razgatlıoğlu ( (Germany) ROKiT BMW Motorrad WorldSBK Team) |
| 6–13 | Handball | (Algeria) 2025 African Women's Junior Handball Championship | Continental | Egypt |
| 7 | Endurance racing | (United States) 2025 Lone Star Le Mans (WEC #6) | International | Hypercar: (France) Kévin Estre & (Belgium) Laurens Vanthoor ( (Germany) Porsche Penske Motorsport); LMGT3: (Indonesia) Sean Gelael, (United Kingdom) Darren Leung & (Japan) Marino Sato ( (United Kingdom) United Autosports) |
| 7 | Formula racing | (Italy) 2025 Italian Grand Prix (F1 #16) | International | (Netherlands) Max Verstappen ( (Austria) Red Bull Racing-Honda RBPT) |
| 7 | Motorcycle racing | (Catalonia) 2025 Catalan motorcycle Grand Prix (MotoGP #15) | International | MotoGP: (Spain) Álex Márquez ( (Italy) BK8 Gresini Racing MotoGP); Moto2: (Spain) Daniel Holgado ( (Spain) CFMoto Inde Aspar Team); Moto3: (Spain) Ángel Piqueras ( (Spain) Frinsa – MT Helmets – MSi) |
| 7–13 | Softball | (Czech Republic) 2025 Women's Softball European Championship | Continental | Italy |
| 7–14 | Badminton | (Thailand) 2025 BWF World Senior Championships | International | Denmark |
| 8–19 | Squash | (Egypt) 2025 CIB Egyptian Open (Diamond #1) | International | Men: (Egypt) Mostafa Asal; Women: (Egypt) Hania El Hammamy |
| 9–15 | Para-shooting | (Czech Republic) 2025 World Para Trap Championships | International | Italy |
| 9–28 | Cricket | (United Arab Emirates) 2025 Asia Cup | Continental | India |
| 10–22 | Arm wrestling | (Bulgaria) 2025 World Armwrestling Championship | International | |
| 11–14 | Rallying | 2025 Rally Chile (WRC #11) | International | WRC: (France) Sébastien Ogier & (France) Vincent Landais ( (Japan) Toyota Gazoo Racing WRT); WRC-2: (Sweden) Oliver Solberg & (United Kingdom) Elliott Edmondson ( (Finland) Printsport); WRC-3: (Italy) Matteo Fontana & (Italy) Alessandro Arnaboldi) |
| 12–14 | Darts | (Netherlands) 2025 World Series of Darts Finals | International | (Netherlands) Michael van Gerwen |
| 12–14 | Triathlon | (France) 2025 Ironman World Championship | International | (Norway) Casper Stornes |
| 12–28 | Volleyball | (Philippines) 2025 FIVB Men's Volleyball World Championship | International | Italy |
| 13–21 | Athletics | (Japan) 2025 World Athletics Championships | International | United States |
| 13–21 | Inline speed skating | (China) 2025 Inline Speed Skating World Championships | International | Colombia |
| 13–21 | Wrestling | (Croatia) 2025 World Wrestling Championships | International | Japan |
| 14 | Motorcycle racing | 2025 San Marino and Rimini Riviera motorcycle Grand Prix (MotoGP #16) | International | MotoGP: (Spain) Marc Márquez ( (Italy) Ducati Lenovo Team); Moto2: (Italy) Celestino Vietti ( (Italy) SpeedRS Team); Moto3: (Spain) José Antonio Rueda ( (Finland) Red Bull KTM Ajo) |
| 14–21 | Handball | (Algeria) 2025 African Women's Youth Handball Championship | Continental | Egypt |
| 15–20 | Archery | (Poland) 2025 European Field Archery Championships | Continental | Italy |
| 15–25 | Handball | (Jordan) 2025 Asian Men's U-17 Handball Championship | Continental | Iran |
| 16–21 | Beach volleyball | (Georgia (country)) 2025 FIVB Beach Volleyball U21 World Championships | International | |
| 16–21 | Tennis | (China) 2025 Billie Jean King Cup finals | International | Italy |
| 17–21 | Basketball | (China) 2025 FIBA 3x3 U23 World Cup | International | Men: Lithuania; Women: Netherlands |
| 18–21 | Basketball | (Singapore) 2025 FIBA Intercontinental Cup | International | (Spain) Unicaja |
| 18–21 | Equestrian | (United Kingdom) 2025 European Eventing Championships | Continental | Individual: (United Kingdom) Laura Collett; Team: Germany |
| 19–28 | Skateboarding | (United States) 2025 World Skateboarding Championship | International | |
| 20–24 | Futsal | (Fiji) 2025 OFC Futsal Nations Cup | Continental | Solomon Islands |
| 20–26 | Baseball | (Venezuela) 2025 Women's Baseball Pan American Championship | Continental | Venezuela |
| 20–27 | Baseball | (Netherlands) 2025 European Baseball Championship | Continental | Netherlands |
| 21 | Formula racing | 2025 Azerbaijan Grand Prix (F1 #17) | International | (Netherlands) Max Verstappen ( (Austria) Red Bull Racing-Honda RBPT) |
| 21 | Marathon | (Germany) 2025 Berlin Marathon (WMM #5) | International | Men: (Kenya) Sabastian Sawe; Women: (Kenya) Rosemary Wanjiru |
| 21–27 | Para-swimming | (Singapore) 2025 World Para Swimming Championships | International | Italy |
| 21–28 | Road cycling | (Rwanda) 2025 UCI Road World Championships | International | Netherlands |
| 21–28 | Rowing | (China) 2025 World Rowing Championships | International | Netherlands |
| 21–28 | Sport climbing Paraclimbing | (South Korea) 2025 IFSC Climbing World Championships (South Korea) 2025 IFSC Paraclimbing World Championships | International | Slovenia |
| 21–4 October | Association football | (French Polynesia) 2025 OFC U-19 Women's Championship | Continental | New Zealand |
| 22–28 | Basketball | (Malaysia) 2025 FIBA U16 Women's Asia Cup (Division A) | Continental | Chinese Taipei |
| 22–28 | Para-archery | (South Korea) 2025 World Para Archery Championships | International | China |
| 22–28 | Baseball | (China) 2025 Asian Baseball Championship | Continental | Japan |
| 24–27 | Flag football | (France) 2025 IFAF European Flag Football Championship | Continental | Men: Italy; Women: (United Kingdom) Great Britain |
| 25–28 | Athletics | (Spain) 2025 World Mountain and Trail Running Championships | International | Kenya |
| 26–28 | Golf | (United States) 2025 Ryder Cup | International | Team Europe |
| 26–28 | Para table tennis | (New Zealand) 2025 Oceania Para Table Tennis Championships | Continental | |
| 26–2 October | Handball | (Egypt) 2025 IHF Men's Club World Championship | International | (Spain) FC Barcelona |
| 26–5 October | Para-athletics | (India) 2025 World Para Athletics Championships | International | Brazil |
| 27–28 | Para-judo | (Georgia (country)) 2025 IBSA European Judo Championships | Continental | Georgia |
| 27–28 | Motorcycle racing | (Aragon) 2025 WSBK Aragón Round | International | R1: (Turkey) Toprak Razgatlıoğlu ( (Germany) ROKiT BMW Motorrad WorldSBK Team); SR: (Italy) Nicolò Bulega ( (Italy) Aruba.it Racing – Ducati); R2: (Italy) Nicolò Bulega ( (Italy) Aruba.it Racing – Ducati) |
| 27–1 October | Softball | (United States) 2025 U-18 Women's Softball World Cup Finals | International | United States |
| 27–5 October | International draughts | (Trinidad and Tobago) 2025 Women's World Draughts Championship | International | |
| 27–19 October | Association football | (Chile) 2025 FIFA U-20 World Cup | International | Morocco |
| 28 | Endurance racing | (Japan) 2025 6 Hours of Fuji (WEC #7) | International | Hypercar: (France) Paul-Loup Chatin, (Austria) Ferdinand Habsburg & (France) Charles Milesi ( (France) Alpine Endurance Team); LMGT3: (Angola) Rui Andrade, (Republic of Ireland) Charlie Eastwood & (Belgium) Tom van Rompuy ( (United Kingdom) TF Sport) |
| 28 | Motorcycle racing | (Japan) 2025 Japanese motorcycle Grand Prix (MotoGP #17) | International | MotoGP: (Italy) Francesco Bagnaia ( (Italy) Ducati Lenovo Team); Moto2: (Spain) Daniel Holgado ( (Spain) CFMoto Power Electronics Aspar Team ); Moto3: (Spain) David Muñoz ( (Germany) Liqui Moly Dynavolt Intact GP) |
| 28–4 October | Squash | 2025 QTerminals Qatar Classic (Platinum #1) | International | Men: (New Zealand) Paul Coll; Women: (Egypt) Hania El Hammamy |
| 28–5 October | Futsal | (Moldova) 2025 UEFA Under-19 Futsal Championship | International | Portugal |
| 28–11 October | Aquatic sports | (India) 2025 Asian Aquatics Championships | Continental | China |
| 29–4 October | Archery | (Serbia) 2025 European 3D Archery Championships | Continental | |
| 29–4 October | Canoe slalom | (Australia) 2025 ICF Canoe Slalom World Championships | International | France |
| 30–4 October | Speedway | (Poland) 2025 Speedway of Nations | International | Australia |
| 30–5 October | Para-badminton | (Turkey) 2025 European Para-Badminton Championships | Continental | France |
| 30–2 November | Cricket | (India) / (Sri Lanka) 2025 Women's Cricket World Cup | International | India |

=== October ===
| Date | Sport | Venue/Event | Status | Winner/s |
|---|---|---|---|---|
| 1–4 | Golf | (Singapore) 2025 Espirito Santo Trophy | International | United States |
| 1–5 | Road bicycle racing | (France) 2025 European Road Championships | Continental | Belgium |
| 1–12 | Tennis | (China) 2025 Shanghai Masters | International | (Monaco) Valentin Vacherot |
| 2–11 | Weightlifting | (Norway) 2025 World Weightlifting Championships | International | North Korea |
| 3–5 | Athletics | (Colombia) 2025 Pan American U20 Athletics Championships | Continental | Colombia |
| 4 | Mixed martial arts | (United States) UFC 320: Ankalaev vs. Pereira 2 | International | (Brazil) Alex Pereira |
| 4–5 | BMX freestyle | (Netherlands) 2025 BMX Freestyle European Championships | Continental | Men's flatland: (Netherlands) Sietse van Berkel; Men's park: (United Kingdom) Dylan Hessey; Women's flatland: (Hungary) Anna Mondics; Women's park: (Germany) Kim Lea Müller |
| 5 | Formula racing | 2025 Singapore Grand Prix (F1 #18) | International | (United Kingdom) George Russell ( (Germany) Mercedes) |
| 5 | Horse racing | (France) 2025 Prix de l'Arc de Triomphe | International | Horse: (France) Daryz; Jockey: (France) Mickael Barzalona; Trainer: (France) Francis-Henri Graffard |
| 5 | Motorcycle racing | (Indonesia) 2025 Indonesian motorcycle Grand Prix (MotoGP #18) | International | MotoGP: (Spain) Fermín Aldeguer ( (Italy) BK8 Gresini Racing MotoGP); Moto2: (Brazil) Diogo Moreira ( (Italy) Italtrans Racing Team); Moto3: (Spain) José Antonio Rueda ( (Finland) Red Bull KTM Ajo) |
| 5–8 | Judo | (Peru) 2025 World Judo Juniors Championships | International | Japan |
| 6–12 | Darts | (England) 2025 World Grand Prix | International | (England) Luke Littler |
| 8–11 | Golf | (Singapore) 2025 Eisenhower Trophy | International | South Africa |
| 8–19 | Shooting | (Greece) 2025 World Shotgun Championships | International | United States |
| 9–12 | Para table tennis | (Brazil) 2025 Pan-American Para Table Tennis Championships | Continental | Brazil |
| 11 | Road bicycle racing | (Italy) 2025 Il Lombardia (Monument #5) | International | (Slovenia) Tadej Pogačar ( (United Arab Emirates) UAE Team Emirates XRG) |
| 11–12 | Motorcycle racing | 2025 ARRC Malaysia round | International | R1: (Malaysia) Hafizh Syahrin ( (Malaysia) JDT Racing Team); R2: Azroy Anuar ( Idemitsu Honda Racing Malaysia) |
| 11–12 | Motorcycle racing | (Portugal) 2025 WSBK Estoril Round | International | R1: (Turkey) Toprak Razgatlıoğlu ( (Germany) ROKiT BMW Motorrad WorldSBK Team); SR: (Turkey) Toprak Razgatlıoğlu ( (Germany) ROKiT BMW Motorrad WorldSBK Team); R2: (Italy) Nicolò Bulega ( (Italy) Aruba.it Racing – Ducati) |
| 11–12 | Gravel cycling | (Netherlands) 2025 UCI Gravel World Championships | International | Men: (Belgium) Florian Vermeersch; Women: (Netherlands) Lorena Wiebes |
| 11–15 | Squash | (United States) 2025 Silicon Valley Open (Gold #2) | International | Men: (Egypt) Karim Gawad; Women: (United States) Olivia Weaver |
| 11–15 | Table tennis | (India) 2025 Asian Table Tennis Championships | Continental | China |
| 11–18 | Field hockey | (Egypt) 2025 Men's Hockey Africa Cup of Nations (Egypt) 2025 Women's Hockey Africa Cup of Nations | Continental | Men: South Africa; Women: South Africa |
| 11–18 | Paralympic powerlifting | (Egypt) 2025 World Para Powerlifting Championships | International | China |
| 12 | Marathon | (United States) 2025 Chicago Marathon (WMM #6) | International | Men: (Uganda) Jacob Kiplimo; Women: (Ethiopia) Hawi Feysa |
| 12–19 | Table tennis | (Tunisia) 2025 African Table Tennis Championships | Continental | Egypt |
| 12–19 | Table tennis | (Croatia) 2025 European Table Tennis Championships | Continental | Men: France; Women: Germany |
| 12–19 | Table tennis | (United States) 2025 Pan American Table Tennis Championships | Continental | Brazil |
| 13–19 | Badminton | (India) 2025 BWF World Junior Championships | International | China |
| 14–20 | Para table tennis | (China) 2025 Asian Para Table Tennis Championships | Continental | |
| 16–19 | Para-cycling | (Brazil) 2025 UCI Para-cycling Track World Championships | International | Australia |
| 16–19 | Rallying | (Germany) / (Austria) / (Czech Republic) 2025 Central European Rally (WRC #12) | International | WRC: (Finland) Kalle Rovanperä & (Finland) Jonne Halttunen ( (Japan) Toyota Gazoo Racing WRT); WRC-2: (Czech Republic) Filip Mareš & (Czech Republic) Radovan Bucha; WRC-3: (Australia) Taylor Gill & (Australia) Daniel Brkic ( FIA Rally Star) |
| 15–19 | Triathlon; Paratriathlon | (Australia) 2025 World Triathlon Championships (Australia) 2025 World Triathlon Para Championships | International | Men: (Australia) Matthew Hauser; Women: (Germany) Lisa Tertsch; Para: France |
| 17–19 | Endurance racing | (China) 2025 GT World Challenge Asia (Beijing round #6) | International | R1: (Japan) Hiromasa Kitano & (Japan) Yu Kanamaru ( (Japan) Team 5ZIGEN); R2: (China) Ye Yifei & (China) Zhang Yaqi ( (China) Winhere Harmony Racing) |
| 17–19 | Mixed martial arts | Senior Amateur MMA World Championships | International | |
| 17–8 November | Association football | (Morocco) 2025 FIFA U-17 Women's World Cup | International | North Korea |
| 18–19 | Motorcycle racing | (Spain) 2025 WSBK Jerez Round | International | R1: (Italy) Nicolò Bulega ( (Italy) Aruba.it Racing – Ducati); SR: (Italy) Nicolò Bulega ( (Italy) Aruba.it Racing – Ducati); R2: (Italy) Nicolò Bulega ( (Italy) Aruba.it Racing – Ducati) |
| 19 | Formula racing | 2025 United States Grand Prix (F1 #19) | International | (Netherlands) Max Verstappen ( (Austria) Red Bull Racing-Honda RBPT) |
| 19 | Motorcycle racing | (Australia) 2025 Australian motorcycle Grand Prix (MotoGP #19) | International | MotoGP: (Spain) Raúl Fernández ( (United States) Trackhouse MotoGP Team); Moto2: (Australia) Senna Agius ( (Germany) Liqui Moly Dynavolt Intact GP); Moto3: (Spain) José Antonio Rueda ( (Finland) Red Bull KTM Ajo) |
| 19–25 | Artistic gymnastics | (Indonesia) 2025 World Artistic Gymnastics Championships | International | China |
| 19–25 | Squash | (United States) 2025 Comcast Business U.S. Open (Platinum #2) | International | Men: (Egypt) Mostafa Asal; Women: (Egypt) Hania El Hammamy |
| 19–26 | Curling | (United States) 2025 Pan Continental Curling Championships | Regional | Men: Canada; Women: China |
| 19–31 | Multi-sport | (Bahrain) 2025 Asian Youth Games | Continental | China |
| 20–26 | Basketball | (Paraguay) 2025 FIBA U17 Women's South American Championship | Continental | Argentina |
| 22–26 | Track cycling | (Chile) 2025 UCI Track Cycling World Championships | International | Netherlands |
| 20–27 | Wrestling | (Serbia) 2025 U23 World Wrestling Championships | International | Japan |
| 24–30 | Taekwondo | (China) 2025 World Taekwondo Championships | International | Turkey |
| 24–1 November | Baseball | (Canada) / (United States) 2025 World Series | Domestic | (United States) Los Angeles Dodgers |
| 24–1 November | Handball | (Morocco) 2025 IHF Men's U17 Handball World Championship | International | Germany |
| 25 | Mixed martial arts | (United Arab Emirates) UFC 321: Aspinall vs. Gane | International | No contest ( (England) Tom Aspinall retained title) |
| 25 | Wrestling | (United States) RAF 02: Dake vs. Makoev | International | (United States) Kyle Dake |
| 25–28 | American football | (Germany) 2025 IFAF Men's European Championships Final Four | Continental | Austria |
| 26 | Boxing | (Philippines) Pedro Taduran vs. Christian Balunan | International | (Philippines) Pedro Taduran |
| 26 | Formula racing | 2025 Mexico City Grand Prix (F1 #20) | International | (United Kingdom) Lando Norris ( (United Kingdom) McLaren-Mercedes) |
| 26 | Motorcycle racing | (Malaysia) 2025 Malaysian motorcycle Grand Prix (MotoGP #20) | International | MotoGP: (Spain) Álex Márquez ( (Italy) BK8 Gresini Racing MotoGP); Moto2: (United Kingdom) Jake Dixon ( (Belgium) Elf Marc VDS Racing Team); Moto3: (Japan) Taiyo Furusato ( (Japan) Honda Team Asia) |
| 26–2 November | Baseball | (China) 2025 Women's Baseball Asian Cup | Continental | Japan |
| 27–2 November | Tennis | (France) 2025 Paris Masters | International | (Italy) Jannik Sinner |
| 28–4 November | Weightlifting | (Albania) 2025 European Junior and U23 Weightlifting Championships | Continental | Armenia |
| 29 | Boxing | (Philippines) Melvin Jerusalem vs. Siyakholwa Kuse | International | (Philippines) Melvin Jerusalem |
| 29–2 November | Standup paddleboarding | (United Arab Emirates) 2025 ICF SUP World Championships | International | |
| 31–1 November | Horse racing | (United States) 2025 Breeders' Cup | International | Breeders' Cup Classic: Horse: (Japan) Forever Young; Jockey: (Japan) Ryusei Sakai; Trainer: (Japan) Yoshito Yahagi |
| 31–2 November | Judo | (Moldova) 2025 European U23 Judo Championships | Continental | Georgia |
| 31–9 November | Multi-sport | (Chile) 2025 Youth Parapan American Games | Continental | Brazil |
| 31–27 November | Chess | (India) Chess World Cup 2025 | International | (Uzbekistan) Javokhir Sindarov |

=== November ===
| Date | Sport | Venue/Event | Status | Winner/s |
|---|---|---|---|---|
| 1–8 | Tennis | (Saudi Arabia) 2025 WTA Finals | International | (Kazakhstan) Elena Rybakina |
| 1–8 | Volleyball | (Jordan) 2025 Asian Women's U16 Volleyball Championship | Continental | South Korea |
| 2 | Marathon | (United States) 2025 New York City Marathon (WMM #7) | International | Men: (Kenya) Benson Kipruto; Women: (Kenya) Hellen Obiri |
| 2–10 | Volleyball | (Costa Rica) 2025 Girls' U17 NORCECA Continental Championship | Continental | United States |
| 3–8 | Baseball5 | (Lithuania) 2025 Baseball5 European Championship | Continental | France |
| 3–27 | Association football | (Qatar) 2025 FIFA U-17 World Cup | International | Portugal |
| 4 | Horse racing | (Australia) 2025 Melbourne Cup | International | Horse: (Australia) Half Yours; Jockey: (Australia) Jamie Melham; Trainer: (Australia) Tony & Calvin McEvoy |
| 4–8 | Bowls | (Malaysia) 2025 Bowls World Cup | International | Men: (England) Sam Tolchard; Women: (Malaysia) Emma Firyana Saroji |
| 4–8 | Freestyle BMX and trials | (Saudi Arabia) 2025 UCI Urban Cycling World Championships | International | Spain |
| 5–8 | Ice hockey | (Kazakhstan) 2026 IIHF Women's Asia Championship | Continental | Japan |
| 6–9 | Rallying | 2025 Rally Japan (WRC #13) | International | WRC: (France) Sébastien Ogier & (France) Vincent Landais ( (Japan) Toyota Gazoo Racing WRT); WRC-2: (Spain) Alejandro Cachón & (Spain) Borja Rozada ( (Spain) Toyota España); WRC-3: (France) Ghjuvanni Rossi & (France) Kylian Sarmezan) |
| 6–9 | Trampoline gymnastics | (Spain) 2025 Trampoline Gymnastics World Championships | International | China |
| 6–16 | Shooting | (Egypt) 2025 ISSF World Shooting Championships | International | China |
| 7–9 | Indoor cycling | (Germany) 2025 UCI Indoor Cycling World Championships | International | Germany |
| 7–21 | Multi-sport | (Saudi Arabia) 2025 Islamic Solidarity Games | International | Turkey |
| 8 | Endurance racing | 2025 8 Hours of Bahrain (WEC #8) | International | Hypercar: (United Kingdom) Mike Conway, (Japan) Kamui Kobayashi & (Netherlands) Nyck de Vries ( (Japan) Toyota Gazoo Racing); LMGT3: (Argentina) José María López, (Austria) Clemens Schmid & (Romania) Răzvan Umbrărescu ( (France) Akkodis ASP Team) |
| 8–9 | Cyclo-cross | (Belgium) 2025 UEC Cyclo-cross European Championships | Continental | Men: (Belgium) Toon Aerts; Women: (Netherlands) Inge van der Heijden |
| 8–14 | Archery | (Bangladesh) 2025 Asian Archery Championships | Continental | India |
| 8–16 | Darts | (England) 2025 Grand Slam of Darts | International | (England) Luke Littler |
| 9 | Motorcycle racing | (Portugal) 2025 Portuguese motorcycle Grand Prix (MotoGP #21) | International | MotoGP: (Italy) Marco Bezzecchi ( (Italy) Aprilia Racing); Moto2: (Brazil) Diogo Moreira ( (Italy) Italtrans Racing Team); Moto3: (Spain) Máximo Quiles ( (Spain) CFMoto Aspar Team) |
| 9–16 | Tennis | (Italy) 2025 ATP Finals | International | (Italy) Jannik Sinner |
| 9 | Formula racing | (Brazil) 2025 São Paulo Grand Prix (F1 #21) | International | (United Kingdom) Lando Norris ( (United Kingdom) McLaren-Mercedes) |
| 10–16 | Snooker | (England) 2025 Champion of Champions | International | (England) Mark Selby |
| 11–16 | Squash | 2025 China Open (Gold #3) | International | Men: (Egypt) Mohamed Abouelghar; Women: (Egypt) Amina Orfi |
| 14 | Boxing | (United States) Jake Paul vs. Gervonta Davis | International | Cancelled |
| 14–16 | Aerobic gymnastics | (Azerbaijan) 2025 Aerobic Gymnastics European Championships | Continental | Romania |
| 14–23 | Beach volleyball | (Australia) 2025 Beach Volleyball World Championships | International | Men: (Sweden) David Åhman / David Åhman; Women: (Latvia) Tīna Graudiņa / Anastasija Samoilova |
| 15 | Mixed martial arts | (United States) UFC 322: Della Maddalena vs. Makhachev | International | (Russia) Islam Makhachev |
| 15–16 | Rugby sevens | (Kenya) 2025 Africa Women's Sevens | Continental | South Africa |
| 15–26 | Multi-sport | (Japan) 2025 Summer Deaflympics | International | Ukraine |
| 16 | Motorcycle racing | 2025 Valencian Community motorcycle Grand Prix (MotoGP #22) | International | MotoGP: (Italy) Marco Bezzecchi ( (Italy) Aprilia Racing); Moto2: (Spain) Izan Guevara ( (Italy) Blu Cru Pramac Yamaha Moto2); Moto3: (Spain) Adrián Fernández ( (Luxembourg) Leopard Racing) |
| 16 | Canadian football | (Canada) 112th Grey Cup | Domestic | Saskatchewan Roughriders |
| 17–21 | Handball | (Paraguay) 2025 South and Central American Women's Youth Handball Championship | Continental | Argentina |
| 17–25 | Wheelchair rugby | (Thailand) 2025 IWRF Asia-Oceania Championship | Continental | |
| 18–23 | Tennis | (Italy) 2025 Davis Cup Finals | International | Italy |
| 18–23 | Volleyball | (Nicaragua) 2025 Boys' U17 NORCECA Continental Championship | Continental | Puerto Rico |
| 19–21 | Taekwondo | (Switzerland) 2025 European Junior Taekwondo Championships | Continental | (Authorised Neutral Athletes) Individual Neutral Athletes |
| 19–23 | Archery | (Ivory Coast) 2025 African Archery Championships | Continental | |
| 20–23 | Ice hockey | (China) 2026 IIHF Asia Championship | Continental | Kazakhstan |
| 20–24 | Artistic gymnastics | (Philippines) 2025 Junior World Artistic Gymnastics Championships | International | China |
| 20–24 | Para table tennis | (Egypt) 2025 African Para Table Tennis Championships | Continental | |
| 20–25 | Para table tennis | (Sweden) 2025 European Para Table Tennis Championships | Continental | Germany |
| 21–7 December | Futsal | (Philippines) 2025 FIFA Futsal Women's World Cup | International | Brazil |
| 22 | Association football | (Paraguay) 2025 Copa Sudamericana final | Continental | (Argentina) Lanús |
| 22 | Formula racing | (United States) 2025 Las Vegas Grand Prix (F1 #22) | International | (Netherlands) Max Verstappen ( (Austria) Red Bull Racing-Honda RBPT) |
| 22–29 | Curling | (Finland) 2025 European Curling Championships | Continental | Men: Sweden; Women: Sweden |
| 22–7 December | Multi-sport | (Peru) 2025 Bolivarian Games | Regional | Colombia |
| 23–30 | Table tennis | (Romania) 2025 ITTF World Youth Championships | International | China |
| 26–29 | Rallying | 2025 Rally Saudi Arabia (WRC #14) | International | WRC: (Belgium) Thierry Neuville & (Belgium) Martijn Wydaeghe ( (South Korea) Hyundai Shell Mobis WRT); WRC-2: (United Kingdom) Gus Greensmith & (Sweden) Jonas Andersson; WRC-3: (Italy) Matteo Fontana & (Italy) Alessandro Arnaboldi) |
| 26–14 December | Handball | (Germany) / (Netherlands) 2025 World Women's Handball Championship | International | Norway |
| 27–30 | 3x3 basketball | (Mexico) 2025 FIBA 3x3 AmeriCup | Continental | Men: United States; Women: United States |
| 27–30 | Karate | (Egypt) 2025 World Karate Championships | International | Egypt |
| 28–2 December | Association football | (Germany) / (Spain) 2025 UEFA Women's Nations League final | Continental | Spain |
| 28–7 December | Darts | (England) 2025 WDF World Darts Championship | International | Open: (Netherlands) Jimmy van Schie; Women: (England) Deta Hedman |
| 28–10 December | Field hockey | (India) 2025 Men's FIH Hockey Junior World Cup | International | Germany |
| 29 | Association football | (Peru) 2025 Copa Libertadores final | Continental | (Brazil) Flamengo |
| 29 | Wrestling | (United States) RAF 03: Mendes vs. Chandler | International | (United States) Michael Chandler |
| 29–30 | Sailing | (United Arab Emirates) 2024–25 SailGP Championship Grand Final | International | (United Kingdom) Emirates GBR |
| 29–7 December | Snooker | (England) 2025 UK Championship (Triple Crown #1) | International | (England) Mark Selby |
| 29–7 December | Socca | (Mexico) 2025 Socca World Cup | International | Poland |
| 30 | Formula racing | 2025 Qatar Grand Prix (F1 #23) | International | (Netherlands) Max Verstappen ( (Austria) Red Bull Racing-Honda RBPT) |
| 30–7 December | Table tennis | (China) 2025 ITTF Mixed Team World Cup | International | China |

=== December ===
| Date | Sport | Venue/Event | Status | Winner/s |
|---|---|---|---|---|
| 1–7 | Squash | 2025 Milwaukee Hong Kong Open (Platinum #3) | International | Men: (Egypt) Mostafa Asal; Women: (Egypt) Nour El Sherbini |
| 1–13 | Field hockey | (Chile) 2025 Women's FIH Hockey Junior World Cup | International | Netherlands |
| 1–14 | Equestrian | (Thailand) 2025 FEI Asian Equestrian Championships | Continental | Thailand |
| 1–18 | Association football | (Qatar) 2025 FIFA Arab Cup | Regional | Morocco |
| 2–7 | Swimming | (Poland) 2025 European Short Course Swimming Championships | Continental | Italy |
| 3–6 | Taekwondo | (Kenya) 2025 World U21 Taekwondo Championships | International | Turkey |
| 4–7 | Figure skating | (Japan) 2025–26 Grand Prix of Figure Skating Final | International | United States |
| 4–13 | Amateur boxing | (United Arab Emirates) 2025 IBA Men's World Boxing Championships | International | Russia |
| 5–7 | 3x3 basketball | (Madagascar) 2025 FIBA 3x3 Africa Cup | Continental | Men: Madagascar; Women: Madagascar |
| 5–14 | Basketball | (Egypt) 2025 Women's Basketball League Africa | Continental | (Egypt) Al Ahly |
| 5–14 | Surfing | (Peru) 2025 ISA World Junior Surfing Championship | International | Australia |
| 6 | Formula racing | (Brazil) 2025 São Paulo ePrix (FE #1) | International | (United Kingdom) Jake Dennis ( (Germany) Porsche) |
| 6 | Mixed martial arts | (United States) UFC 323: Dvalishvili vs. Yan 2 | International | (Russia) Petr Yan |
| 6–7 | Motorcycle racing | 2025 ARRC Thailand round | International | R1: (Malaysia) Hafizh Syahrin; R2: (Thailand) Nakarin Atiratphuvapat |
| 6–14 | Floorball | (Czech Republic) 2025 Women's World Floorball Championships | International | Switzerland |
| 7 | Formula racing | (United Arab Emirates) 2025 Abu Dhabi Grand Prix (F1 #24) | International | (Netherlands) Max Verstappen ( (Austria) Red Bull Racing-Honda RBPT) |
| 7–14 | Multi-sport | (United Arab Emirates) 2025 Asian Youth Para Games | Continental | Uzbekistan |
| 8–13 | Basketball | (Samoa) 2025 FIBA U17 Oceania Cup (Samoa) 2025 FIBA U17 Women's Oceania Cup | Continental | Men: New Zealand; Women: Australia |
| 9–14 | Squash | (India) 2025 Squash World Cup | International | India |
| 9–14 | Volleyball | (Brazil) 2025 FIVB Volleyball Women's Club World Championship | International | (Italy) Savino Del Bene Scandicci |
| 9–20 | Multi-sport | (Thailand) 2025 SEA Games | Regional | Thailand |
| 9–28 June 2026 | Field Hockey | (Republic of Ireland) (Argentina) / (Spain) (India) (Australia) / (Netherlands) (Belgium) (England) (Germany) 2025–26 Men's FIH Pro League (Republic of Ireland) (Argentina) / (Spain) (China) (Australia) / (Netherlands) (Belgium) (England) (Germany) 2025–26 Women's FIH Pro League | International | Men:Belgium; Women:Netherlands |
| 10–14 | Basketball | (Paraguay) 2025 FIBA U17 South American Championship | Continental | Brazil |
| 10–14 | Table tennis | (Hong Kong) 2025 WTT Finals | International | Men: (Japan) Tomokazu Harimoto; Women: (China) Wang Manyu |
| 10–20 | Multi-sport | (Angola) 2025 African Youth Games | Continental | South Africa |
| 11–14 | Taekwondo | (Kosovo) 2025 European U21 Taekwondo Championships | Continental | Turkey |
| 11–3 January 2026 | Darts | (England) 2026 PDC World Darts Championship | International | (England) Luke Littler |
| 12–14 | Baseball | (United Arab Emirates) 2025 United Series | Continental | (United Arab Emirates) Mid East Falcons |
| 12–21 | Cricket | (United Arab Emirates) 2025 ACC Under-19 Asia Cup | Continental | Pakistan |
| 14 | Athletics | (Portugal) 2025 European Cross Country Championships | Continental | Men: (Spain) Thierry Ndikumwenayo; Women: (Italy) Nadia Battocletti |
| 16–21 | Volleyball | (Brazil) 2025 FIVB Volleyball Men's Club World Championship | International | (Italy) Sir Sicoma Monini Perugia |
| 17 | Association football | (Qatar) 2025 FIFA Intercontinental Cup final | International | (France) Paris Saint-Germain |
| 17–21 | Badminton | (China) 2025 BWF World Tour Finals | International | Men: (France) Christo Popov; Women: (South Korea) An Se-young |
| 17–21 | Tennis | (Saudi Arabia) 2025 Next Gen ATP Finals | International | (United States) Learner Tien |
| 20 | Wrestling | (United States) RAF 04: Hendrickson vs. Parris | International | (United States) Wyatt Hendrickson |
| 21–18 January 2026 | Association football | (Morocco) 2025 Africa Cup of Nations | Continental | Senegal |
| 26–28 | Chess | (Qatar) World Rapid Chess Championship 2025 (Qatar) World Women's Rapid Chess Championship 2025 | International | Open: (Norway) Magnus Carlsen; Women: (FIDE) Aleksandra Goryachkina |
| 26–5 January 2026 | Ice hockey | (United States) 2026 World Junior Ice Hockey Championships | International | Sweden |
| 28–4 January 2026 | Cross-country skiing | (Italy) 2025–26 Tour de Ski | International | Men: (Norway) Johannes Høsflot Klæbo; Women: (United States) Jessie Diggins |
| 29–30 | Chess | (Qatar) World Blitz Chess Championship 2025 (Qatar) World Women's Blitz Chess Championship 2025 | International | Open: (Norway) Magnus Carlsen; Women: (Kazakhstan) Bibisara Assaubayeva |
| 29–6 January 2026 | Ski jumping | (Germany) / (Austria) 2025–26 Four Hills Tournament | International | (Slovenia) Domen Prevc |

== Multi-sport events ==
- January 13 – 23: 2025 Winter World University Games in (Italy) Turin
- February 7 – 14: 2025 Asian Winter Games in (China) Harbin
- February 8 – 16: 2025 Invictus Games in (Canada) Vancouver-Whistler
- February 9 – 16: 2025 European Youth Olympic Winter Festival in (Georgia (country)) Borjomi-Bakuriani
- March 8 – 16: 2025 Special Olympics World Winter Games in (Italy) Turin
- May 17 – 30: 2025 Summer World Masters Games in (Taiwan) Taipei-New Taipei City
- May 27 – 31: 2025 Games of the Small States of Europe in Andorra la Vella
- July 12 – 18: 2025 Island Games in (Orkney) Kirkwall–Stromness
- July 16 – 27: 2025 Summer World University Games in (Germany) Rhine-Ruhr
- July 20 – 26: 2025 European Youth Summer Olympic Festival in (North Macedonia) Skopje
- July 11 – August 3: 2025 World Aquatics Championships in Singapore
- August 7 – 17: 2025 World Games in (China) Chengdu
- August 9 – 23: 2025 Junior Pan American Games in (Paraguay) Asunción
- October 22 – 31: 2025 Asian Youth Games in (Bahrain) Manama
- November 9 – 21: 2025 Islamic Solidarity Games in (Saudi Arabia) Riyadh
- November 15 – 26: 2025 Summer Deaflympics in (Japan) Tokyo
- November 22 – December 7: 2025 Bolivarian Games in (Peru) Lima and Ayacucho
- December 9 – 20: 2025 Southeast Asian Games in Thailand
- December 2025 African Youth Games
- December 2025 Asian Youth Para Games
- CISM Martial Arts World Cup, Germany

== Air sports ==
2025 Air Sports Results
| Date | Sport | Event | Champions / Winners |
|---|---|---|---|
| Sep 13 | Paragliding | United States Paragliding National Championship | Men's National Champion: Mitch Riley (USA) |
| Sep 13 | Paragliding | United States Paragliding National Championship | Women's National Champion: Galen Kirkpatrick (USA) |

=== United States Paragliding National Championship ===
The 2025 United States Paragliding National Championship title was determined by the cumulative point totals achieved by pilots across the USHPA National Series events.

== American football ==
=== International Federation of American Football ===
- TBA: 2025 IFAF World Championship (location TBA)
- September 24–27: 2025 IFAF European Flag Football Championship in Paris, France (tournament)
  - Men final: Italy defeated Austria 27–19
  - Women final: (United Kingdom) Great Britain defeated Austria 34–33

=== National Football League ===
- February 2: 2025 Pro Bowl Games in Orlando, Florida
- February 9: Super Bowl LIX in New Orleans, Louisiana
  - (Pennsylvania) Philadelphia Eagles defeated (Missouri) Kansas City Chiefs, 40–22.
- April 24–26: 2025 NFL draft in Green Bay, Wisconsin
- September 4, 2025 – January 4, 2026: 2025 NFL season

=== European League of Football ===
- May 17 – September 7: 2025 European League of Football season
- September 7: Championship Game
  - (Germany) Stuttgart Surge defeated (Austria) Vienna Vikings 24–17

=== United Football League ===
- March 28 – June 1: 2025 UFL season
- June 14: 2025 UFL championship game in (Missouri) St. Louis
  - (Washington, D.C.) DC Defenders defeated Michigan Panthers, 58–34.

=== Indoor American football ===
Arena Football One

- March 7 – June 15: 2025 AF1 season
- June 28: Arena Crown 2025 in (New York (state)) Albany
  - (New York (state)) Albany Firebirds defeated (Tennessee) Nashville Kats, 60–57

Indoor Football League

- March 21 – July 27: 2025 IFL season
- August 23: 2025 IFL National Championship in (Arizona) Tucson
  - (Nevada) Vegas Knight Hawks defeated (Wisconsin) Green Bay Blizzard, 64–61.

National Arena League

- March 8 – May 31: 2025 NAL season
- June 16: 2025 NAL Championship Game in (Texas) Beaumont
  - (Texas) Beaumont Renegades defeated (Nebraska) Omaha Beef, 37–29.

The Arena League

- May 30 – July 26: 2025 TAL season
- August 9: ArenaMania II in (Minnesota) Duluth
  - (Minnesota) Duluth Harbor Monsters defeated (Arkansas) Hot Springs Wiseguys, 56–27.

== Aquatics ==
- July 11 – August 3: 2025 World Aquatics Championships in Singapore

== Association football ==
FIFA

- 14 June – 13 July: 2025 FIFA Club World Cup in United States
- 17 October – 8 November : 2025 FIFA U-17 Women's World Cup in Morocco
- 5 – 27 November : 2025 FIFA U-17 World Cup in Qatar
- 27 September – 19 October : 2025 FIFA U-20 World Cup in Chile

CAF

- 21 December – 18 January 2026: 2025 Africa Cup of Nations in Morocco

UEFA

- July 2–27: UEFA Women's Euro 2025 in Switzerland

=== Beach soccer ===
- 1–11 May: 2025 FIFA Beach Soccer World Cup in Seychelles

=== Futsal ===
- 21 November – 7 December: 2025 FIFA Futsal Women's World Cup in Philippines

== Athletics ==
- 21–23 March: 2025 World Athletics Indoor Championships in (China) Nanjing
- 13–21 September: 2025 World Athletics Championships in (Japan) Tokyo

=== Europe ===
- 2 February: 2025 European Champion Clubs Cup Cross Country in Portugal
- 6–9 March: 2025 European Athletics Indoor Championships in (Netherlands) Apeldoorn
- 15–16 March: 2025 European Throwing Cup in Cyprus
- 12–13 April: 2025 European Running Championships in Belgium
- 18 May: 2025 European Race Walking Team Championships in Czech Republic
- 24 May: 2025 European 10000m Cup in France
- 24–29 June: 2025 European Athletics Team Championships (2nd and 3rd Division) in Slovenia
- 27–29 June: 2025 European Athletics Team Championships (1st Division) in (Spain) Madrid
- 17–20 July: 2025 European Athletics U23 Championships in Norway
- 7–10 August: 2025 European Athletics U20 Championships in Finland
- 14 December: 2025 European Cross Country Championships in Portugal

== Badminton ==
- 2025 BWF season

There happened several major badminton events in 2025. These events typically take place on an annual basis, and some of the most notable tournaments include:

- BWF World Championships 2025
  - Date: August 2025
  - Location: TBC (usually held in different locations around the world)
  - The BWF World Championships is one of the sport's most prestigious events, featuring top players from around the world competing for the title of World Champion in multiple categories (men's and women's singles, men's and women's doubles, and mixed doubles).
- BWF Thomas and Uber Cup Finals 2025
  - Date: May 2025
  - Location: TBC
  - The Thomas Cup (for men) and Uber Cup (for women) are the equivalent of the world team championships. National teams compete against each other for the prestigious title.
- All England Open Badminton Championships 2025
  - Date: 11–16 March 2025
  - Location: Birmingham, England
  - One of the oldest and most prestigious tournaments, this event attracts the best players from around the world. It is part of the BWF World Tour Super 1000 series.
- BWF World Tour Events (Super 1000, Super 750, Super 500, Super 300, and Super 100)
  - Dates: Throughout 2025
  - These tournaments take place at various locations globally throughout the year and provide players the opportunity to earn points for their world rankings. Key events include:
    - Indonesia Open (Super 1000)
    - China Open (Super 1000)
    - Malaysia Open (Super 750)
    - Singapore Open (Super 500)
    - Hong Kong Open (Super 500)
    - Thailand Open (Super 300)
- Asian Badminton Championships 2025
  - Date: April 2025
  - Location: TBC
  - This prestigious continental event features the top players from across Asia competing for the title.

== Baseball ==
=== Major League Baseball ===
- March 27 – September 28: 2025 Major League Baseball season
- July 13–15: 2025 Major League Baseball draft in (Georgia (U.S. state)) Atlanta, Georgia
- July 15: 2025 Major League Baseball All-Star Game at Truist Park in (Georgia (U.S. state)) Cumberland, Georgia
- October 24 – November 1: 2025 World Series
  - The (California) Los Angeles Dodgers defeat the (Ontario) Toronto Blue Jays, 4–3 in games played, to win their ninth World Series title.

=== 2025 Little League World Series ===
- August 14–24: Little League World Series at Little League Volunteer Stadium and Howard J. Lamade Stadium, both in South Williamsport, Pennsylvania

== Basketball ==
- June 28 – July 6: 2025 FIBA Under-19 Basketball World Cup in Switzerland
- July 12–20: 2025 FIBA Under-19 Women's Basketball World Cup in Czech Republic

=== FIBA Africa ===
- 25 July–3 August: 2025 Women's Afrobasket in Ivory Coast
- 12–24 August: AfroBasket 2025 in Angola

=== FIBA Americas ===
- 28 June–6 July: 2025 FIBA Women's AmeriCup in Chile
- 23–31 August: 2025 FIBA AmeriCup in Nicaragua

=== FIBA Asia ===
- 13–20 July: 2025 FIBA Women's Asia Cup in China
- 5–17 August: 2025 FIBA Asia Cup in Saudi Arabia

=== FIBA Europe ===
- 18–29 June: EuroBasket Women 2025 in Czech Republic, Germany, Greece and Italy
- August 27 – September 14: EuroBasket 2025 in Cyprus, Finland, Latvia and Poland

=== National Basketball Association ===
- October 22, 2024 – April 13: 2024–25 NBA season
- February 16: 2025 NBA All-Star Game at the Chase Center in San Francisco, California
- April 19 – June 22: 2025 NBA playoffs
  - Oklahoma City Thunder defeated Indiana Pacers, 4–3 in games played
- June 26: 2025 NBA draft in (New York (state)) New York City, New York
- October 2 – 12, November 1: NBA Global Games and NBLxNBA
- October 21 – April 12, 2026: 2025–26 NBA season
- October 31 – December 16: 2025 NBA Cup
  - (New York (state)) New York Knicks defeated (Texas) San Antonio Spurs, 124–113

=== National Collegiate Athletic Association ===
- March 18 – April 7: 2025 NCAA Division I men's basketball tournament
- March 21 – April 6: 2025 NCAA Division I women's basketball tournament

== Canadian football ==
Canadian Football League

- April 29: 2025 CFL draft and 2025 CFL global draft
- June 5 – October 25: 2025 CFL season
- November 16: 112th Grey Cup in Winnipeg, Manitoba
  - Saskatchewan Roughriders defeated (Quebec) Montreal Alouettes, 25–17

U Sports

- August 22 – October 25: 2025 U Sports football season
- November 22: 60th Vanier Cup in Regina, Saskatchewan
  - (Quebec) Montreal Carabins defeated Saskatchewan Huskies, 30–16

== Cricket ==
- 2025 ICC Champions Trophy
- 2023–25 ICC World Test Championship Final
- 30 September 2025 – 2 November 2025 2025 Women's Cricket World Cup in India, Sri Lanka

== Cycling ==
=== Road ===
==== 2025 UCI World Tour (men) ====
The race calendar for the 2025 season was announced in June 2024, with thirty-six races scheduled. The calendar was similar to 2024, with a new one-day race in Denmark, the Copenhagen Sprint. In October 2024, the final calendar was confirmed.

2025 UCI World Tour
| Date | Race | Winner |
|---|---|---|
| 21–26 January | (Australia) Tour Down Under | Jhonatan Narváez (ECU) |
| 2 February | (Australia) Cadel Evans Great Ocean Road Race | Mauro Schmid (SUI) |
| 17–23 February | (United Arab Emirates) UAE Tour | Tadej Pogačar (SLO) |
| 1 March | (Belgium) Omloop Het Nieuwsblad | Søren Wærenskjold (NOR) |
| 8 March | (Italy) Strade Bianche | Tadej Pogačar (SLO) |
| 9–16 March | (France) Paris–Nice | Matteo Jorgenson (USA) |
| 10–16 March | (Italy) Tirreno–Adriatico | Juan Ayuso (ESP) |
| 22 March | (Italy) Milan–San Remo ^{m: #1} | Mathieu van der Poel (NED) |
| 24–30 March | (Spain) Volta a Catalunya | Primož Roglič (SLO) |
| 26 March | (Belgium) Classic Brugge–De Panne | Juan Sebastián Molano (COL) |
| 28 March | (Belgium) E3 Saxo Classic | Mathieu van der Poel (NED) |
| 30 March | (Belgium) Gent-Wevelgem | Mads Pedersen (DEN) |
| 2 April | (Belgium) Dwars door Vlaanderen | Neilson Powless (USA) |
| 6 April | (Belgium) Tour of Flanders ^{m: #2} | Tadej Pogačar (SLO) |
| 7–12 April | (Spain) Tour of the Basque Country | João Almeida (POR) |
| 13 April | (France) Paris–Roubaix ^{m: #3} | Mathieu van der Poel (NED) |
| 20 April | (Netherlands) Amstel Gold Race | Mattias Skjelmose (DEN) |
| 23 April | (Belgium) La Flèche Wallonne | Tadej Pogačar (SLO) |
| 27 April | (Belgium) Liège–Bastogne–Liège ^{m: #4} | Tadej Pogačar (SLO) |
| 29 April – 4 May | (Switzerland) Tour de Romandie | João Almeida (POR) |
| 1 May | (Germany) Eschborn–Frankfurt | Michael Matthews (AUS) |
| 9 May – 1 June | (Italy) Giro d'Italia ^{gt: #1} | Simon Yates (GBR) |
| 8–15 June | (France) Critérium du Dauphiné | Tadej Pogačar (SLO) |
| 15–22 June | (Switzerland) Tour de Suisse | João Almeida (POR) |
| 22 June | (Denmark) Copenhagen Sprint | Jordi Meeus (BEL) |
| 5–27 July | Tour de France ^{gt: #2} | Tadej Pogačar (SLO) |
| 2 August | (Spain) Clásica de San Sebastián | Giulio Ciccone (ITA) |
| 4–10 August | (Poland) Tour de Pologne | Brandon McNulty (USA) |
| 17 August | (Germany) Hamburg Cyclassics | Rory Townsend (IRL) |
| 20–24 August | (Belgium) / (Netherlands) Renewi Tour | Arnaud de Lie (BEL) |
| 23 August – 14 September | (Spain) Vuelta a España ^{gt: #3} | Jonas Vingegaard (DEN) |
| 31 August | Bretagne Classic Ouest-France | Arnaud de Lie (BEL) |
| 12 September | (Canada) Grand Prix Cycliste de Québec | Julian Alaphilippe (FRA) |
| 14 September | (Canada) Grand Prix Cycliste de Montréal | Brandon McNulty (USA) |
| 11 October | (Italy) Il Lombardia ^{m: #5} | Tadej Pogačar (SLO) |
| 14–19 October | (China) Tour of Guangxi | Paul Double (GBR) |

_{m #: Monument classic gt#: Grand Tour}

==== 2025 UCI Women's World Tour ====
2025 UCI Women's World Tour
| Date | Race | Winner |
|---|---|---|
| 17–19 January | (Australia) Women's Tour Down Under | Noemi Rüegg (SUI) |
| 1 February | (Australia) Cadel Evans Great Ocean Road Race | Ally Wollaston (NZL) |
| 6–9 February | (United Arab Emirates) UAE Tour Women | Elisa Longo Borghini (ITA) |
| 1 March | (Belgium) Omloop Het Nieuwsblad | Lotte Claes (BEL) |
| 8 March | (Italy) Strade Bianche Donne | Demi Vollering (NED) |
| 16 March | (Italy) Trofeo Alfredo Binda-Comune di Cittiglio | Elisa Balsamo (ITA) |
| 22 March | (Italy) Milan–San Remo Women | Lorena Wiebes (NED) |
| 27 March | (Belgium) Classic Brugge–De Panne | Lorena Wiebes (NED) |
| 30 March | (Belgium) Gent–Wevelgem | Lorena Wiebes (NED) |
| 6 April | (Belgium) Tour of Flanders | Lotte Kopecky (BEL) |
| 12 April | (France) Paris–Roubaix Femmes | Pauline Ferrand-Prévot (FRA) |
| 20 April | (Netherlands) Amstel Gold Race | Mischa Bredewold (NED) |
| 23 April | (Belgium) La Flèche Wallonne Féminine | Puck Pieterse (NED) |
| 27 April | (Belgium) Liège–Bastogne–Liège Femmes | Kimberley Le Court (MRI) |
| 4–10 May | (Spain) La Vuelta Femenina | Demi Vollering (NED) |
| 16–18 May | (Spain) Itzulia Women | Demi Vollering (NED) |
| 22–25 May | (Spain) Vuelta a Burgos Feminas | Marlen Reusser (SUI) |
| 5–8 June | (United Kingdom) Tour of Britain Women | Ally Wollaston (NZL) |
| 12–15 June | (Switzerland) Tour de Suisse Women | Marlen Reusser (SUI) |
| 21 June | (Denmark) Copenhagen Sprint | Lorena Wiebes (NED) |
| 6–13 July | (Italy) Giro d'Italia Women | Elisa Longo Borghini (ITA) |
| 26 July – 3 August | Tour de France Femmes | Pauline Ferrand-Prévot (FRA) |
| 15–17 August | (Switzerland) Tour de Romandie Féminin | Elise Chabbey (SUI) |
| 30 August | (France) Classic Lorient Agglomération | Mischa Bredewold (NED) |
| 7–12 October | (Netherlands) Simac Ladies Tour | Lorena Wiebes (NED) |
| 14–16 October | (China) Tour of Chongming Island | Anne Knijnenburg (NED) |
| 19 October | (China) Tour of Guangxi | Anna Henderson (GBR) |

==== National and International champions ====
UCI World Championships
| World | Men's road race | Men's time trial | Women's road race | Women's time trial |
|---|---|---|---|---|
| World Championships | Tadej Pogačar (SLO) | Remco Evenepoel (BEL) | Magdeleine Vallieres (CAN) | Marlen Reusser (SUI) |
Continental Championships
| Continent | Men's road race | Men's time trial | Women's road race | Women's time trial |
| Pan American | Álvaro Hodeg (COL) | Walter Vargas (COL) | Juliana Londoño (COL) | Ruth Edwards (USA) |
| European | Tadej Pogačar (SLO) | Remco Evenepoel (BEL) | Demi Vollering (NED) | Marlen Reusser (SUI) |
| African | Merhawi Kudus (ERI) | Brandon Downes (RSA) | Haylee Preen (RSA) | Lucy Young (RSA) |
| Asian | Lyu Xianjing (CHN) | Yevgeniy Fedorov (KAZ) | Jutatip Maneephan (THA) | Yanina Kuskova (UZB) |
| Oceanian | cancelled due to hosting issues | | | |
National Championships
| Nation | Men's road race | Men's time trial | Women's road race | Women's time trial |
| Afghanistan | | | Fariba Hashimi | Fariba Hashimi |
| Albania | Lukas Sulaj Kloppenborg | Olsian Velia | Nelia Kabetaj | Nelia Kabetaj |
| Algeria | Yacine Hamza | Azzedine Lagab | Nesrine Houili | Nesrine Houili |
| Angola | | | | |
| Argentina | Leonardo Cobarrubia | Mateo Kalejmann | Jennifer Francone | |
| Australia | Luke Durbridge | Luke Plapp | Lucinda Stewart | Brodie Chapman |
| Austria | Tim Wafler | Felix Großschartner | Kathrin Schweinberger | Christina Schweinberger |
| Belgium | Tim Wellens | Remco Evenepoel | Justine Ghekiere | Lotte Kopecky |
| Belize | | Cory Williams | | Patricia Chavarria |
| Benin | Ricardo Sodjede | Ricardo Sodjede | Charlotte Metoevi | Hermionne Ahouissou |
| Bermuda | Conor White | Nicholas Narraway | Panzy Olander | Panzy Olander |
| Bolivia | Eduardo Moyata | Freddy Gonzales | Wanda Florencia Villanueva | Wanda Florencia Villanueva |
| Bosnia and Herzegovina | | | | |
| Brazil | | | | |
| Bulgaria | Borislav Palashev | Emil Stoynev | Nikol Kolisheva | Nikol Kolisheva |
| Burkina Faso | Daouda Soulama | | Awa Bamogo | |
| Cameroon | Fabrice Chofor | | Presline Mariolle Kengne Feudjio | |
| Canada | Derek Gee | Michael Leonard | | Olivia Baril |
| Cape Verde | Nelio da Cruz | | | |
| Chile | Hector Exequiel Quintana | Hector Exequiel Quintana | Catalina Anais Soto | Catalina Anais Soto |
| China | Chengshuo Miao | Ming Xue | Lulu Chen | Suwan Wei |
| Colombia | Egan Bernal | Egan Bernal | Juliana Londoño | Diana Peñuela |
| Costa Rica | Gabriel Francisco Rojas | Donovan Ramírez | Adriana Maria Rojas | Gloriana Maria Quesada |
| Croatia | Nicolas Gojković | | Andrea Heged | Ana Rumiha |
| Cuba | José Alberto Domínguez | Yunior Brayan Mandin Medina | Marlies Mejías | Marlies Mejías |
| Czech Republic | Mathias Vacek | Andreas Miltiadis | Kristýna Burlová | Constantina Georgiou |
| Denmark | Søren Kragh Andersen | Mathias Vacek | Alberte Greve | Julia Kopecký |
| Dominican Republic | Jesus Roniel Marte | Mads Pedersen | | Rebecca Koerner |
| Ecuador | Jhonatan Narváez | Erlin Antonio Garcia | Natalia Vasquez | Flor Espiritusanto |
| Egypt | Abdul Rauf Ahmed Abdul Rauf | Jefferson Alveiro Cepeda | Ahmed Ebtissam Zayed | Miryam Maritza Nuñez |
| El Salvador | Brandon Ulises Rodríguez | Mohab Youssef Aziz | | Ahmed Ebtissam Zayed |
| Eritrea | Nahom Zeray | Brandon Ulises Rodríguez | Monalisa Araya | Sauking Raquel Shi |
| Estonia | Madis Mihkels | Amanuel Ghebreigzabhier | Elisabeth Ebras | |
| Eswatini | Kwanele Jele | Rein Taaramäe | Mandiswa Fakudze | Laura Lizette Sander |
| Ethiopia | Tekle Alemayo | Negasi Haylu Abreha | Haftu Reda | Fkadu Brhan Abrha |
| Finland | Johan Nordlund | Trond Larsen | Anniina Ahtosalo | Anniina Ahtosalo |
| France | Dorian Godon | Bruno Armirail | Net Marie Le | Cédrine Kerbaol |
| Germany | Georg Zimmermann | Maximilian Schachmann | Franziska Koch | Antonia Niedermaier |
| Great Britain | Samuel Watson | Ethan Hayter | Millie Couzens | Zoe Bäckstedt |
| Greece | Nikiforos Arvanitou | Georgios Bouglas | Argiro Milaki | |
| Grenada | Red Walters | Red Walters | | |
| Guatemala | | Sergio Geovani Chumil | Jasmin Gabriela Soto | Jasmin Gabriela Soto |
| Hongkong | Pak Hang Ng | Tsun Wai Chu | Sze Wing Lee | Sze Wing Lee |
| Hungary | Márton Dina | János Pelikán | Blanka Vas | Petra Zsankó |
| Iceland | | Ingvar Ómarsson | | Hafdís Sigurðardóttir |
| Indonesia | | Muhammad Syelhan | | Ayustina Delia Priatna |
| Iran | | | | |
| Ireland | Rory Townsend | Ryan Mullen | Mia Griffin | Kelly Murphy |
| Israel | | | | |
| Italy | Filippo Conca | Filippo Ganna | Elisa Longo Borghini | Vittoria Guazzini |
| Japan | Marino Kobayashi | | Akari Kobayashi | |
| Kazakhstan | Yevgeniy Fedorov | Yevgeniy Fedorov | Yelizaveta Sklyarova | Akpeiil Ossim |
| Kosovo | Blerton Nuha | Blerton Nuha | Sibora Kadriu | Sibora Kadriu |
| Laos | Ariya Phounsavath | | | |
| Latvia | Toms Skujiņš | Toms Skujiņš | Dana Rožlapa | Dana Rožlapa |
| Lesotho | Kabelo Makatile | Kabelo Makatile | | Tsepiso Lerata |
| Lithuania | Aivaras Mikutis | Aivaras Mikutis | Daiva Ragažinskienė | Skaistė Mikašauskaitė |
| Luxembourg | Arthur Kluckers | Bob Jungels | Marie Schreiber | Marie Schreiber |
| Malaysia | Muhammad Nur Aiman Bin Rosli | Muhammad Nur Aiman Bin Rosli | Asri Nurul Nabilah Mohd | Ci Hui Nyo |
| Mauritius | Torea Celestin | Alexandre Mayer | Kimberley Le Court | Kimberley Le Court |
| Mongolia | Tegsh-Bayar Batsaikhan | Jambaljamts Sainbayar | | |
| Montenegro | Aleksandar Radunović | | | |
| Morocco | | Kouraji Mohcine El | | Mallika Benallal |
| Namibia | Alex Miller | Alex Miller | Anri Krugel | Anri Krugel |
| Netherlands | Danny van Poppel | Daan Hoole | Lorena Wiebes | Mischa Bredewold |
| New Zealand | Paul Wright | Finn Fisher-Black | Kim Cadzow | Kim Cadzow |
| North Macedonia | Stefan Petrovski | Slobodan Nastevski | Elena Petrova | Elena Petrova |
| Norway | Andreas Leknessund | Tobias Foss | Mie Bjørndal Ottestad | Katrine Aalerud |
| Pakistan | Ali Jawaid | Ali Jawaid | Rabia Garib | Rabia Garib |
| Panama | Roberto Carlos González | Carlos Samudio | Wendy Ducreux | Wendy Ducreux |
| Paraguay | Carlos Dominguez | Francisco Daniel Riveros | Araceli Jazmin Galeano | Araceli Jazmin Galeano |
| Peru | Bill Janz Toscano | Robinson Steven Ruiz | Mariana Rojas | Romina Maribel Medrano |
| Philippines | Marcelo Felipe | Nash Lim | Kim Syrel Bonilla | Jermyn Prado |
| Poland | Rafał Majka | Filip Maciejuk | Katarzyna Niewiadoma | Agnieszka Skalniak-Sójka |
| Portugal | Ivo Oliveira | António Morgado | Daniela Campos | Beatriz Roxo |
| Puerto Rico | Abner González | | Erialis Otero | |
| Romania | Gerhard-Cristin Moldansky | Emil Dima | Manuela Mureșan | Manuela Mureșan |
| Rwanda | | Samuel Niyonkuru | Djazilla Umwamikazi | Xaverine Nirere |
| São Tomé and Príncipe | | | | |
| Serbia | Veljko Stojnić | Dušan Rajović | Jelena Erić | Iva Pavlović |
| Seychelles | | | | |
| Singapore | Boon Kiak Yeo | Zhen Yu Darren Lim | Yen Ling Kathlyn Yeo | Faye Foo |
| Slovakia | Lukáš Kubiš | Matthias Schwarzbacher | Viktória Chladoňová | Viktória Chladoňová |
| Slovenia | Jakob Omrzel | Mihael Štajnar | Eugenia Bujak | Eugenia Bujak |
| South Africa | Daniyal Matthews | Alan Hatherly | S'Annara Grove | Lucy Young |
| South Korea | Jaebin Yun | Hyeong Min Choe | Suji Jang | Jieun Shin |
| Spain | Iván Romeo | Abel Balderstone | Sara Martín | Mireia Benito |
| Sweden | Hugo Forssell | | Mika Söderström | |
| Switzerland | Mauro Schmid | Mauro Schmid | Steffi Häberlin | Marlen Reusser |
| Thailand | Sarawut Sirironnachai | Peerapol Chawchiangkwang | Phetdarin Somrat | Phetdarin Somrat |
| Tunisia | Mohamed Aziz Dellai | Mohamed Aziz Dellai | Brini Mariem | Asil Moussa |
| Turkey | Samet Bulut | Burak Abay | Gamze Ceyhan | Reyhan Yakişir |
| Uganda | Charles Kagimu | | | Mary Aleper |
| Ukraine | Heorhii Antonenko | Anatoliy Budyak | Yuliia Biriukova | Yuliia Biriukova |
| United Arab Emirates | Mohammad Alsabbagh | Al-Ali Abdulla Jasim | Safia Alsayegh | Safia Alsayegh |
| United States | Quinn Simmons | Artem Shmidt | Kristen Faulkner | Emily Ehrlich |
| Uruguay | Guillermo Thomas Silva | Eric Antonio Fagúndez | Malvina Maria Prieto | Anabel Posse |
| Uzbekistan | Diyor Takhirov | Nikita Tsvetkov | Shakhnoza Abdullaeva | Yanina Kuskova |
| Venezuela | Orluis Aular | Orluis Aular | | Lilibeth Chacón |
| Zimbabwe | Matthew Denslow | Rodrick Shumba | Helen Mitchell | Helen Mitchell |

=== Track ===
The UCI and Warner Bros Discovery (WBD+) announced the early end of their partnership to produce the UCI Track Champions League with immediate effect, with the 2024 season being the last. The UCI Track Nations cup consisted of a single event, with the UCI announcing that they and WBD+ intended to refresh the Nations Cup format, reintroducing the event as a track cycling World Cup in advance of the 2028 Summer Olympics.

==== 2025 World and continental track championships ====
The following is a list of all the World and continental champions in each track discipline for 2025. The continental events are all held in the first half of the year between February (Oceania) and May (African), effectively at the end of the 2024–25 winter season, while the 2025 UCI World Track Championships are held in the autumn, effectively at the beginning of the 2025–26 winter season.

| Discipline | | World | Pan American | European | African | Asian | Oceanian |
|---|---|---|---|---|---|---|---|
| Team sprint | M | | Trinidad and Tobago; Ryan D'Abreau; Nicholas Paul; Njisane Phillip | France; Timmy Gillion; Rayan Helal; Sébastien Vigier | Egypt; Hussein Hassan; Mahmoud Elimbabi; Mahmud Bakr | Japan; Yoshitaku Nagasako; Kaiya Ota; Shinji Nakano | Australia (as Australia A); Ryan Elliott; Thomas Cornish; Daniel Barber; Leigh Hoffman (R) |
| Team sprint | W | | United States; Kayla Hankins; Emily Hayes; Hayley Yoslov; McKenna McKee | Netherlands; Kimberly Kalee; Hetty van de Wouw; Steffie van der Peet | Egypt; Mentalia Belal; Shahd Mohamed; Habiba Osama | China; Bao Shanju; Guo Yufang; Luo Shuyan | New Zealand; Olivia King; Shaane Fulton; Ellesse Andrews |
| Team pursuit | M | | United States; David Domonoske; Anders Johnson; Peter Moore; Brendan Rhim; Sean Christiansen | Denmark; Tobias Hansen; Niklas Larsen; Lasse Norman Leth; Robin Juel Skivild | South Africa; Bradley Gouveris; Kellen Gouveris; Rhys Burrell; Carl Bonthuys | South Korea; Hong Seung-min; Park Sang-hoon; Kim Hyeon-seok; Min Kyeong-ho | Australia; Cameron Scott; Declan Trezise; Liam Walsh; Oscar Gallagher |
| Team pursuit | W | | United States; Olivia Cummins; Emily Ehrlich; Bethany Ingram; Reagen Pattishall | Italy; Martina Alzini; Chiara Consonni; Martina Fidanza; Vittoria Guazzini | Egypt; Mentalia Belal; Shahd Mohamed; Sara Anwar; Ebtissam Zayed Ahmed | Japan; Mizuki Ikeda; Tsuyaka Uchino; Yumi Kajihara; Maho Kakita | New Zealand; Emily Shearman; Samantha Donnelly; Prudence Fowler; Rylee McMullen; Bryony Botha |
| Sprint | M | | Nicholas Paul (TTO) | Harrie Lavreysen (NED) | Hussein Hassan (EGY) | Kaiya Ota (JPN) | Leigh Hoffman (AUS) |
| Sprint | W | | Lauriane Genest (CAN) | Yana Burlakova AIN | Shahd Mohamed (EGY) | Mina Sato (JPN) | Ellesse Andrews (NZL) |
| Kierin | M | | Kevin Quintero (COL) | Harrie Lavreysen (NED) | Mahmoud Elimbabi (EGY) | Shinji Nakano (JPN) | Sam Dakin (NZL) |
| Kierin | W | | Lauriane Genest (CAN) | Steffie van der Peet (NED) | Shahd Mohamed (EGY) | Nurul Izzah Izzati Mohd Asri (MAS) | Ellesse Andrews (NZL) |
| Kilo t.t. | M | | Nicholas Paul (TTO) | Matteo Bianchi (ITA) | Mahmoud Elimbabi (EGY) | Ryuto Ichida (JPN) | Tom Sexton (NZL) |
| Kilo t.t. | W | | Stefany Cuadrado (COL) | Hetty van de Wouw (NED) | Nesrine Houili (ALG) | Nurul Izzah Izzati Mohd Asri (MAS) | Ellesse Andrews (NZL) |
| Individual pursuit | M | | Anders Johnson (USA) | Josh Charlton (GBR) | Ousamma Minouni (ALG) | Kazushige Kuboki (JPN) | Tom Sexton (NZL) |
| Individual pursuit | W | | Emily Ehrlich (USA) | Anna Morris (GBR) | Nesrine Houili (ALG) | Maho Kakita (JPN) | Bryony Botha (NZL) |
| Omnium | M | | Peter Moore (USA) | Tim Torn Teutenberg (GER) | Bradley Gouveris (RSA) | Naoki Kojima (JPN) | Campbell Stewart (NZL) |
| Omnium | W | | Yareli Acevedo (MEX) | Lorena Wiebes (NED) | Ebtissam Zayed Ahmed (EGY) | Mizuki Ikeda (JPN) | Emily Shearman (NZL) |
| Madison | M | | United States; Peter Moore; Brendan Rhim | Netherlands; Yanne Dorenbos; Vincent Hoppezak | Egypt; Mahmoud Bakr; Youssef Abouelhassan | Japan; Eiya Hashimoto; Kazushige Kuboki | New Zealand; Tom Sexton; Campbell Stewart |
| Madison | W | | Colombia; Elizabeth Castaño; Lina Hernández | Netherlands; Lisa van Belle; Maike van der Duin | Egypt; Shahd Mohamed; Ebtissam Zayed Ahmed | Japan; Yumi Kajihara; Tsuyaka Uchino | New Zealand; Bryony Botha; Samantha Donnelly |
| Pointa race | M | | Hugo Ruiz (PER) | Iúri Leitão (POR) | Anes Riahi (ALG) | Tetsuo Yamamoto (JPN) | Tom Sexton (NZL) |
| Pointa race | W | | Teniel Campbell (TTO) | Anita Stenberg (NOR) | Ebtissam Zayed Ahmed (EGY) | Maho Kakita (JPN) | Rylee McMullen (NZL) |
| Scratch race | M | | Cameron Fitzmaurice (CAN) | Iúri Leitão (POR) | Bradley Gouveris (RSA) | Dmitriy Bocharov (UZB) | Keegan Hornblow (NZL) |
| Scratch race | W | | Yareli Acevedo (MEX) | Martina Fidanza (ITA) | Ebtissam Zayed Ahmed (EGY) | Lee Sze Wing (HKG) | Mckenzie Milne (NZL) |
| Elimination | M | | Brendan Rhim (USA) | Tim Torn Teutenberg (GER) | Mahmoud Bakr (EGY) | Eiya Hashimoto (JPN) | Blake Agnoletto (AUS) |
| Elimination | W | | Yareli Acevedo (MEX) | Lara Gillespie (IRL) | Ebtissam Zayed Ahmed (EGY) | Tsuyaka Uchino (JPN) | Samantha Donnelly (NZL) |

== Equestrianism ==
=== Horse racing ===
- May 3: Kentucky Derby in Churchill Downs
- May 17: Preakness Stakes in (Maryland) Pimlico
- June 7: Belmont Stakes in (New York (state)) Belmont Park
- Oct 31 – Nov 1: Breeders Cup in (California) Del Mar Racetrack

== Gaelic football ==
=== County football ===
- 2025 All-Ireland Senior Football Championship – Champions Kerry 1–26 (29) bt Donegal 0–19 (19) (39th title)
  - Ulster Senior Championship – Donegal 2–23 (29) beat Armagh 0–28 (28) (12th title)
  - Munster Senior Championship – Kerry 4–20 (32) beat Clare 0–21 (21) (89th title)
  - Leinster Senior Championship – Louth 3–15 (24) beat Meath 1–18 (21) (9th title)
  - Connacht Senior Championship – Galway 1–17 (20) beat Mayo 1–15 (18) (49th title)
  - Taitleann Cup (Level II) – Kildare 1–24 (27) beat Limerick 2–19 (25) (1st title)
- National Football League: Overall champions : Kerry (21st title)
  - Division 1 – Kerry 1–18 (21) bt Mayo 1–12 (15)
  - Division 2 – Monaghan 1–26 (29) bt Roscommon 1–19 (22)
  - Division 3 – Offaly 2–27 (33) bt Kildare 1–18 (21)
  - Division 4 – Limerick 3–11 (20) bt Wexford 0–18 (16)

=== Club football ===
- All-Ireland Senior Football Club Championship:
  - Ulster Senior Club Championship –
  - Munster Senior Club Championship –
  - Leinster Senior Club Championship –
  - Connacht Senior Club Championship –

=== Universities football ===
- Sigerson Cup: DCU 1–16 (19) bt UCD 3-06 (15) (6th title)

=== Schools and Colleges football ===
- Hogan Cup (All-Ireland) – St Patrick's Maghera 2–8 (14) bt St Colman's Claremorris 0–4 (4) (6th title)
  - MacRrory Cup (Ulster) – St Patrick's Maghera 0 – 12 (12) bt Abbey Vocational School 2–5 (11) (17th title)
  - Leinster Colleges Senior Championship – Coláiste Mhuire, Mullingar 3–10 (19) bt Ardscoil na Tríonóide, Athy 1–13 (16) (1st title)
  - Connacht Colleges Senior Championship – Saint Colman's College, Claremorris 2–9 (15) bt Summerhill College, Sligo 1–9 (12) (7th title)
  - Corn Uí Mhuirí (Munster) – Mercy Mounthawk 2–11 (17) bt St. Brendan's, Killarney 0–10 (10) (2nd title)

== Golf ==
=== Men's major golf championships (PGA Tour) ===
- April 10–13: 2025 Masters Tournament at Augusta National Golf Club in Augusta, Georgia – (Northern Ireland) Rory McIlroy
- May 15–18: 2025 PGA Championship at Quail Hollow Club in Charlotte, North Carolina – (United States) Scottie Scheffler
- June 12–15: 2025 U.S. Open at Oakmont Country Club in Oakmont, Pennsylvania – (United States) J. J. Spaun
- July 17–20: 2025 Open Championship at Royal Portrush Golf Club in Portrush, Northern Ireland – (United States) Scottie Scheffler

=== Women's major golf championships (LPGA Tour) ===
- April 24–27: 2025 Chevron Championship at The Club at Carlton Woods in The Woodlands, Texas – (Japan) Mao Saigo
- May 29 – June 1: 2025 U.S. Women's Open at Erin Hills in Erin, Wisconsin – (Sweden) Maja Stark
- June 19–22: 2025 Women's PGA Championship in PGA Frisco in Frisco, Texas – (Australia) Minjee Lee
- July 10–13: 2025 Evian Championship in Evian Resort Golf Club in Évian-les-Bains, France – (Australia) Grace Kim
- August 22–25: 2025 Women's British Open at Royal Porthcawl in Porthcawl, Wales – (Japan) Miyū Yamashita

=== Senior major golf championships (PGA Tour Champions) ===
- May 15–19: The Tradition at Greystone Golf & Country Club in Birmingham, Alabama – (Argentina) Ángel Cabrera
- May 22–25: Senior PGA Championship at Congressional Country Club in Bethesda, Maryland – (Argentina) Ángel Cabrera
- June 19–22: Kaulig Companies Championship at Firestone Country Club in Akron, Ohio – (Spain) Miguel Ángel Jiménez
- June 26–29: U.S. Senior Open at Broadmoor Golf Club in Colorado Springs, Colorado – (Republic of Ireland) Pádraig Harrington
- July 24–27: ISPS Handa Senior Open at Sunningdale Golf Club at Sunningdale, England – (Republic of Ireland) Pádraig Harrington

== Handball ==
- 14 January – 2 February: 2025 World Men's Handball Championship in Croatia, Denmark and Norway
  - Winner: Denmark (4th title)
- 27 November – 14 December: 2025 World Women's Handball Championship in Germany and Netherlands

== Hockey ==
=== Floorball ===
- January 25: Champions Cup finals
  - Men's champion: (Sweden) Pixbo IBK
  - Women's champion: (Sweden) Pixbo IBK
- April 24 – May 4: 2025 Men's U-19 World Floorball Championships in Switzerland
  - Champion: Finland
- August 6–13: Floorball at the 2025 World Games in China
  - Men's champion: Sweden
  - Women's champion: Finland
- December 6–14: 2025 Women's World Floorball Championships in Czech Republic
  - Champion: Switzerland

=== Ice hockey ===
==== National Hockey League ====
- October 8, 2024 – April 17, 2025: 2024–25 NHL season
- February 12–20: 2025 4 Nations Face-Off
- April 20: 2025 NHL playoffs
- June 27–28: 2025 NHL entry draft
  - #1 pick: (Canada) Matthew Schaefer by New York Islanders

== Hurling ==
=== County hurling ===
- All-Ireland Senior Hurling Championship –
  - Munster Senior Championship – 1–30 (33) Cork beat Limerick 2–27 (33) 3–2 on penalties a.e.t (55th title)
  - Leinster Senior Championship – Kilkenny 3–22 (31) beat Galway 1–20 (23) (77th title)
  - Joe McDonagh Cup (Level II) – Kildare 2–26 (32) beat Laois 1–19 (22)
  - Christy Ring Cup (Level III) – London 1–27 (30) beat Derry 1–24 (27)
  - Nicky Rackard Cup (Level IV) – Roscommon 3–16 (25) beat Mayo 1–21 (24)
  - Lory Meagher Cup (Level V) – New York 4–17 (29) beat Cavan 2–17 (23)
- National Hurling League
  - Division 1a – Cork 3–24 (33) bt Tipperary 0–23 (23) (15th title)
  - Division 1b – Waterford 1–27 (3) bt Offaly 2–20 (26)
  - Division 2 – Down 4–22 (34) bt Kildare 3–18 (27)
  - Division 3 – Mayo 0–14 (14) bt London 1–8 (11)
  - Division 4 – Louth 0–18 (18) bt Fermanagh 1–8 (11)

=== Club hurling ===
- All-Ireland Senior Hurling Club Championship:
  - Ulster Senior Club Championship –
  - Munster Senior Club Championship –
  - Leinster Senior Club Championship –
  - Connacht Senior Club Championship –

=== Universities hurling ===
- Fitzgibbon Cup: University of Limerick 0–23 (23) bt DCU Dóchas Éireann 1–15 (18) (7th title)

=== Schools and Colleges hurling ===
- Dr Croke Cup (All-Ireland) – Thurles CBS 0–24 (24) bt Presentation College Athenry 2–17 (23) (2nd title)
  - Mageean Cup (Ulster) – Cross and Passion, Ballycastle 1–16 (19) bt St Killian's College, Garron Tower 0–13 (13) (9th title)
  - Leinster Colleges Senior Championship – St Kieran's College1–25 (28) bt Kilkenny CBS 2–22 (28), 3–0 on penalties. (59th title)
  - Connacht Colleges Senior Championship – Presentation College, Athenry 3–15 (24) bt Coláiste Bhaile Chláir 0–9 (9) (13th title)
  - Dr Harty Cup (Munster) - Thurles CBS 1–13 (16) bt St Flannan's College 0–13 (13) (9th title)

== Lacrosse ==
=== Premier Lacrosse League (USA) ===
- The New York Atlas defeat the Denver Outlaws 14–13 to win their first PLL title.

=== National Lacrosse League ===
- The Buffalo Bandits defeat the Saskatchewan Rush 2 games to 0, winning their 3rd Champions Cup in a row and 7th overall.

=== College ===
- #1 seed Cornell beats Maryland 13–10 to win the men's D1 championship.
- North Carolina defeats Northwestern 12–8 in the women's D1 tournament.

=== Women's Lacrosse League ===
- The Boston Guard win the inaugural WLL championship series 22–17 over New York.

=== Canadian Amateur ===
- Six Nations defeat the New Westminster Salmonbellies in 7 games to win the Mann Cup, their 9th overall. A fight between spectators breaks out in game 3.
- Coquitlam beats Orangeville 2 games to 0 to win their 6th Minto Cup.
- Kahnawake wins the Founders Cup 9–4 over Coquitlam.
- Snake Island defeats Brooklin in the Presidents Cup.

== Netball ==
International tournaments

| Date | Tournament | Winners | Runners up |
|---|---|---|---|
| 1–9 February | 2025 Netball Nations Cup | England | South Africa |
| 23–31 August | 2025 ECCB International Netball Series | Saint Vincent and the Grenadines | Grenada |
| 19–28 September | 2025 Netball World Youth Cup | Australia | New Zealand |
| 21–28 September | 2025 Taini Jamison Trophy Series | New Zealand | South Africa |
| 4–12 October | 2025 Australia South Africa netball series | Australia | South Africa |
| 17–29 October | 2025 Constellation Cup | Australia | New Zealand |
| 9–11 November | 2025 Scotland New Zealand netball series | New Zealand | Scotland |
| 15–19 November | 2025 England New Zealand netball series | New Zealand | England |
| 26–30 November | 2025 Celtic Cup | Uganda | Scotland |
| 12–17 December | 2025 SEA Games | Malaysia | Singapore |

Major national leagues

| Host | League | Winners | Runners up |
|---|---|---|---|
| Australia | Suncorp Super Netball | Melbourne Vixens | West Coast Fever |
| New Zealand | ANZ Premiership | Mainland Tactix | Northern Mystics |
| United Kingdom | Netball Super League | London Pulse | Loughborough Lightning |

== Parasports ==
Winter sports

- 2025 World Para Nordic Skiing Championships in (Norway) Trondheim
- 2025 World Para Alpine Skiing Championships in (Slovenia) Maribor
- 2025 World Para Ice Hockey Championships in (United States) Buffalo, New York
- 2025 World Para Bobsleigh Championships in (Switzerland) St. Moritz
  - 2025 European Para Bobsleigh Championships in Sigulda, Latvia

Summer sports

- 2025 World Para Athletics Championships in (India) New Delhi
- 2025 World Para Swimming Championships in Singapore
- 2025 IFSC Paraclimbing World Championships in (South Korea) Seoul
- 2025 World Para Archery Championships in (South Korea) Gwangju
- 2025 World Triathlon Para Championships in (Australia) Wollongong, New South Wales
- 2025 Para-cycling Track World Championships in (Brazil) Rio de Janeiro
- 2025 Para-cycling Road World Championships in (Belgium) Ronse

== Rowing ==
- 2025 World Rowing Championships in (China) Shanghai
- 2025 World Rowing Junior Championships in (Lithuania) Trakai

== Rugby ==
=== Rugby league ===
- 2025 Rugby League World Cup in France (Cancelled)

=== Rugby union ===
- 28 June – 2 August: 2025 British & Irish Lions tour to Australia Australia

== Sepak takraw ==
=== International tournaments ===
- March 20–25: 2025 ISTAF World Cup in (India) Bihar

== Sailing ==
- 2024–25 SailGP championship, final in (United Arab Emirates) Abu Dhabi

== Swimming ==
- 26–28 June: 2025 European U-23 Swimming Championships in Šamorín, Slovakia
- 1–6 July: 2025 European Junior Swimming Championships in Šamorín, Slovakia
- 27 July – 3 August: Swimming at the 2025 World Aquatics Championships in Singapore

== Tennis ==
=== Grand Slam ===
- January 12 – 26: 2025 Australian Open
- May 25 – June 7: 2025 French Open
- June 30 – July 13: 2025 Wimbledon Championships
- August 25 – September 7: 2025 US Open

== Triathlon ==
=== World Championship Series ===
- February 15–16: WCS #1 in (United Arab Emirates) Abu Dhabi
  - Elite winners: (New Zealand) Hayden Wilde (m) / (Germany) Lisa Tertsch (f)
  - Mixed Relay winners: Germany (Selina Klamt, Jan Diener, Tanja Neubert, Henry Graf)

=== 2025 World Triathlon Cup ===
- February 23: WTC #1 in (New Zealand) Napier
  - Elite winners: (Spain) David Castro Fajardo (m) / (Canada) Desirae Ridenour (f)

=== 2025 Africa Triathlon Junior Cup ===
- March 8: AfTJC #1 in (Zimbabwe) Troutbeck
- Winners: (South Africa) Nicholas Horne (m) / (South Africa) Kadence Ribbink (f)

=== 2025 Americas Triathlon Cup ===
- February 16: AmTC #1 in (Cuba) La Habana
  - Elite winners: (United States) Braxton Legg (m) / (Mexico) María López Faraudo (f)

=== 2025 Asia Triathlon Cup ===
- February 16: ATC #1 in (India) Chennai
  - Elite winners: (Italy) Francesco Di Basilico (m) / (Indonesia) Martina Ayu Pratiwi (f)
- February 21 – 23: ATC #2 in (Malaysia) Putrajaya
  - Elite winners: (Switzerland) Max Studer (m) / (Canada) Isla Britton (f)

=== World Para Cup ===
- February 15: WPC #1 in (United Arab Emirates) Abu Dhabi
  - Men's PTWC: (Austria) Thomas Frühwirth
  - Men's PTS2: Vasilii Egorov
  - PTS3: (United Kingdom) Ryan Taylor (m) / Anna Plotnikova (f)
  - Men's PTS4: Andrey Tolstikov
  - PTS5: Aleksandr Konyshev (m) / (Spain) Andrea Miguelez Ranz (f)
  - PTVI: (Poland) Łukasz Wietecki (m) / (Republic of Ireland) Chloe MacCombe (f)

=== Continental Championships ===
- February 22: 2025 Asia Triathlon Duathlon Championships in (Bahrain) Manama
  - Elite winners: (Bahrain) Moussa Karich (m) / (China) Lu Ziqing (f)

=== T100 World Tour ===
- February – November : 2025 T100 Triathlon World Tour
  - Elite winners : (New Zealand) Hayden Wilde (m) / (United Kingdom) Kate Waugh (f)

=== Ironman (WTC) ===
- 2025 Ironman World Championship
  - Elite winners : (Norway) Casper Stornes (m) / (Norway) Solveig Løvseth (f)
- 2025 Ironman 70.3 World Championship
  - Elite winners : (Belgium) Jelle Geens (m) / (United Kingdom) Lucy Charles-Barclay (f)

=== World Championships ===
- February 21–23: 2025 World Triathlon Winter Duathlon Championships in Cogne
  - Elite winners: Oleg Chetsikov (m) / Daria Rogozina (f)
  - U23 winners: (Norway) Casper Rønning (m) / (Slovakia) Zuzana Michalíková (f)
  - Mixed Relay winners: Czech Republic (Aneta Grabmüller Soldati, Marek Rauchfuss)
  - Juniors winners: (Italy) Jacopo Fanton (m) / Alina Liagaeva (f)
  - Juniors Mixed Relay winners: Italy II (Ludovica Sabbia, Enrico Bucci)
  - Sprint Elite winners: (Norway) Jørgen Baklid (m) / Daria Rogozina (f)
  - Sprint U23 winners: (Italy) Guglielmo Giuliano (m) / (Slovakia) Zuzana Michalíková (f)
  - Sprint Juniors winners: Savelii Anisimov (m) / Alina Liagaeva

== Volleyball ==
- June 4 – July 27: 2025 FIVB Women's Volleyball Nations League
- June 11 – August 3: 2025 FIVB Men's Volleyball Nations League
- August 22 – September 7: 2025 FIVB Volleyball Women's World Championship in Thailand
- September 12 – September 28: 2025 FIVB Men's Volleyball World Championship in Philippines
