= Kulset =

Kulset is a surname of Norwegian origin. People with that name include:

- Johannes Kulset (born 2004), Norwegian cyclist, brother of Kristian, Magnus and Sindre
- Kristian Kulset (born 1995), Norwegian cyclist, brother of Johannes, Magnus and Sindre
- Magnus Kulset (born 2000), Norwegian cyclist, brother of Johannes, Kristian and Sindre
- Sindre Kulset (born 1998), Norwegian cyclist, brother of Johannes, Kristian and Magnus
