= 2026 CRO Race =

2026 UCI ProSeries

Race details
- Dates: 22 – 27 September 2026
- Stages: 6
- Distance: 940 km (580 mi)
- Winning time: 21h 37' 50"

Results
Jersey awarded to the overall winner	Winner	Tobias Svarre (DEN)	(Uno-X Mobility)
	Second	Antonio Tiberi (ITA)	(Team Bahrain Victorious)
	Third	Tim Wellens (BEL)	(UAE Team Emirates XRG)
Jersey awarded to the points classification winner	Points	Carl-Frederik Bévort (DEN)	(Uno-X Mobility)
Jersey awarded to the mountains classification winner	Mountains	Antonio Tiberi (ITA)	(Team Bahrain Victorious)
Jersey awarded to the young rider classification winner	Young rider	Tobias Svarre (DEN)	(Uno-X Mobility)
	Team	(France) Cofidis	

The 2026 CRO Race was a road cycling stage race in Croatia held between 22 and 27 September 2026. It was the eleventh edition of the Tour of Croatia since its revival in 2015 and the seventh under the CRO Race name. The race was rated as a category 2.Pro event on the 2026 UCI ProSeries Tour calendar, which is upgrade from last edition. Around 120 cyclist from 19 teams participated in the race, cycling through 12 Croatian cities: Split, Seget, Biograd na Moru, Novalja, Krk, Labin, Pula, Rijeka, Karlovac, Sveta Nedelja, Samobor and Zagreb.

Race was broadcast in around 190 countries. It was supported by the Government of Croatia, Ministry of Tourism and Sports, City of Zagreb, Croatian Tourist Board and Hrvatska elektroprivreda (HEP). Ambassador of the race was Croatian rower Martin Sinković.

== Teams ==
Seven UCI WorldTeams, ten UCI ProTeams and two UCI Continental teams made up the 19 teams that participated in the race.

UCI WorldTeams

- Lidl–Trek
- NSN Cycling Team
- Red Bull–Bora–Hansgrohe
- Soudal–Quick-Step
- Team Bahrain Victorious
- UAE Team Emirates XRG
- Uno-X Mobility

UCI ProTeams

- Bardiani–CSF 7 Saber
- Caja Rural–Seguros RGA
- Cofidis
- Equipo Kern Pharma
- Euskaltel–Euskadi
- MBH Bank CSB Telecom Fort
- Modern Adventure Pro Cycling
- Pinarello–Q36.5 Pro Cycling Team
- Solution Tech NIPPO Rali
- Team Polti VisitMalta

UCI Continental Teams

- Pogi Team Gusto Ljubljana
- Wibatech Lubelskie Perła Polski

== Route ==
Stage characteristics and winners
Stage	Date	Course	Distance	Type	Winner
1	22 September	Split to Seget	167 km (104 mi)	Hilly stage	Juan Sebastián Molano (COL)
2	23 September	Biograd na Moru to Novalja	114.5 km (71.1 mi)	Flat stage	Carl-Frederik Bévort (DEN)
3	24 September	Krk to Labin	174.5 km (108.4 mi)	Hilly stage	Tobias Svarre (DEN)
4	25 September	Pula to Rijeka	160 km (99 mi)	Mountain stage	Daniel Martínez (COL)
5	26 September	Karlovac to Sveta Nedelja	164.5 km (102.2 mi)	Hilly stage	Paul Magnier (FRA)
6	27 September	Samobor to Zagreb (Jarun)	159.5 km (99.1 mi)	Flat stage	Davide Donati (ITA)
Total			940 km (580 mi)		

== Stages ==
=== Stage 1 ===
22 September 2026 — Split to Seget, 167 km (104 mi)

Stage 1 result
Rank	Rider	Team	Time
1	Juan Sebastián Molano (COL)	UAE Team Emirates XRG	3h 58' 06"
2	Paul Magnier (FRA)	Soudal–Quick-Step	+ 0"
3	Tim Torn Teutenberg (GER)	Lidl–Trek	+ 0"
4	Žak Eržen (SLO)	Team Bahrain Victorious	+ 0"
5	Enrico Zanoncello (ITA)	Bardiani–CSF 7 Saber	+ 0"
6	Sergi Darder (ESP)	Caja Rural–Seguros RGA	+ 0"
7	Antonio Tiberi (ITA)	Team Bahrain Victorious	+ 0"
8	Matis Louvel (FRA)	NSN Cycling Team	+ 0"
9	Brody McDonald (USA)	Modern Adventure Pro Cycling	+ 0"
10	Gabriele Bessega (ITA)	Team Polti VisitMalta	+ 0"

General classification after Stage 1
Rank	Rider	Team	Time
1	Juan Sebastián Molano (COL)	UAE Team Emirates XRG	3h 57' 56"
2	Sam Maisonobe (FRA)	Cofidis	+ 3"
3	Paul Magnier (FRA)	Soudal–Quick-Step	+ 4"
4	Tim Torn Teutenberg (GER)	Lidl–Trek	+ 6"
5	Žak Eržen (SLO)	Team Bahrain Victorious	+ 10"
6	Enrico Zanoncello (ITA)	Bardiani–CSF 7 Saber	+ 10"
7	Sergi Darder (ESP)	Caja Rural–Seguros RGA	+ 10"
8	Antonio Tiberi (ITA)	Team Bahrain Victorious	+ 10"
9	Matis Louvel (FRA)	NSN Cycling Team	+ 10"
10	Brody McDonald (USA)	Modern Adventure Pro Cycling	+ 10"

=== Stage 2 ===
23 September 2026 — Biograd na Moru to Novalja, 114.5 km (71.1 mi)

Stage 2 result
Rank	Rider	Team	Time
1	Carl-Frederik Bévort (DEN)	Uno-X Mobility	2h 42' 08"
2	Nicolas Gojković (CRO)	Pogi Team Gusto Ljubljana	+ 0"
3	Juan Sebastián Molano (COL)	UAE Team Emirates XRG	+ 0"
4	Lorenzo De Longhi (ITA)	Cofidis	+ 0"
5	Davide Donati (ITA)	Red Bull–Bora–Hansgrohe	+ 0"
6	Matis Louvel (FRA)	NSN Cycling Team	+ 0"
7	Henrik Pedersen (DEN)	Uno-X Mobility	+ 0"
8	Brody McDonald (USA)	Modern Adventure Pro Cycling	+ 0"
9	Gabriele Bessega (ITA)	Team Polti VisitMalta	+ 0"
10	Edward Theuns (BEL)	Lidl–Trek	+ 0"

General classification after Stage 2
Rank	Rider	Team	Time
1	Juan Sebastián Molano (COL)	UAE Team Emirates XRG	6h 40' 00"
2	Carl-Frederik Bévort (DEN)	Uno-X Mobility	+ 4"
3	Sam Maisonobe (FRA)	Cofidis	+ 7"
4	Nicolas Gojković (CRO)	Pogi Team Gusto Ljubljana	+ 8"
5	Paul Magnier (FRA)	Soudal–Quick-Step	+ 8"
6	Tim Torn Teutenberg (GER)	Lidl–Trek	+ 10"
7	Tim Wellens (BEL)	UAE Team Emirates XRG	+ 10"
8	Gorka Sorarrain (ESP)	Caja Rural–Seguros RGA	+ 12"
9	Txomin Juaristi (ESP)	Euskaltel–Euskadi	+ 13"
10	Nils Politt (GER)	UAE Team Emirates XRG	+ 13"

=== Stage 3 ===
24 September 2026 — Krk to Labin, 174.5 km (108.4 mi)

Stage 3 result
Rank	Rider	Team	Time
1	Tobias Svarre (DEN)	Uno-X Mobility	4h 10' 54"
2	Antonio Tiberi (ITA)	Team Bahrain Victorious	+ 0"
3	Tim Wellens (BEL)	UAE Team Emirates XRG	+ 6"
4	Adrien Boichis (FRA)	Red Bull–Bora–Hansgrohe	+ 29"
5	Sam Maisonobe (FRA)	Cofidis	+ 31"
6	Emil Herzog (GER)	Red Bull–Bora–Hansgrohe	+ 31"
7	Johannes Kulset (NOR)	Uno-X Mobility	+ 31"
8	Dylan Teuns (BEL)	Cofidis	+ 31"
9	Steff Cras (BEL)	Soudal–Quick-Step	+ 37"
10	Edoardo Zambanini (ITA)	Team Bahrain Victorious	+ 56"

General classification after Stage 3
Rank	Rider	Team	Time
1	Tobias Svarre (DEN)	Uno-X Mobility	10h 50' 58"
2	Antonio Tiberi (ITA)	Team Bahrain Victorious	+ 4"
3	Tim Wellens (BEL)	UAE Team Emirates XRG	+ 8"
4	Sam Maisonobe (FRA)	Cofidis	+ 34"
5	Adrien Boichis (FRA)	Red Bull–Bora–Hansgrohe	+ 39"
6	Dylan Teuns (BEL)	Cofidis	+ 41"
7	Johannes Kulset (NOR)	Uno-X Mobility	+ 41"
8	Emil Herzog (GER)	Red Bull–Bora–Hansgrohe	+ 41"
9	Steff Cras (BEL)	Soudal–Quick-Step	+ 47"
10	Edoardo Zambanini (ITA)	Team Bahrain Victorious	+ 1' 06"

=== Stage 4 ===
25 September 2026 — Pula to Rijeka, 160 km (99 mi)

Stage 4 result
Rank	Rider	Team	Time
1	Daniel Martínez (COL)	Red Bull–Bora–Hansgrohe	3h 43' 19"
2	Louis Vervaeke (BEL)	Soudal–Quick-Step	+ 0"
3	Domen Novak (SLO)	UAE Team Emirates XRG	+ 0"
4	Aimé De Gendt (BEL)	Pinarello–Q36.5 Pro Cycling Team	+ 0"
5	Sam Maisonobe (FRA)	Cofidis	+ 0"
6	Ilan Van Wilder (BEL)	Soudal–Quick-Step	+ 15"
7	Edoardo Zambanini (ITA)	Team Bahrain Victorious	+ 15"
8	Thomas Pesenti (ITA)	Team Polti VisitMalta	+ 15"
9	Dario Giuliano (FRA)	Team Polti VisitMalta	+ 15"
10	Joseph Pidcock (GBR)	Pinarello–Q36.5 Pro Cycling Team	+ 15"

General classification after Stage 4
Rank	Rider	Team	Time
1	Tobias Svarre (DEN)	Uno-X Mobility	14h 34' 32"
2	Antonio Tiberi (ITA)	Team Bahrain Victorious	+ 4"
3	Tim Wellens (BEL)	UAE Team Emirates XRG	+ 8"
4	Sam Maisonobe (FRA)	Cofidis	+ 19"
5	Adrien Boichis (FRA)	Red Bull–Bora–Hansgrohe	+ 39"
6	Dylan Teuns (BEL)	Cofidis	+ 41"
7	Johannes Kulset (NOR)	Uno-X Mobility	+ 41"
8	Emil Herzog (GER)	Red Bull–Bora–Hansgrohe	+ 41"
9	Steff Cras (BEL)	Soudal–Quick-Step	+ 47"
10	Aimé De Gendt (BEL)	Pinarello–Q36.5 Pro Cycling Team	+ 58"

=== Stage 5 ===
26 September 2026 — Karlovac to Sveta Nedelja, 164.5 km (102.2 mi)

Stage 5 result
Rank	Rider	Team	Time
1	Paul Magnier (FRA)	Soudal–Quick-Step	3h 48' 21"
2	Rui Oliveira (POR)	UAE Team Emirates XRG	+ 0"
3	Tim Torn Teutenberg (GER)	Lidl–Trek	+ 0"
4	Carl-Frederik Bévort (DEN)	Uno-X Mobility	+ 0"
5	Dario Igor Belletta (ITA)	Team Polti VisitMalta	+ 0"
6	Edoardo Zambanini (ITA)	Team Bahrain Victorious	+ 0"
7	Clément Izquierdo (FRA)	Cofidis	+ 0"
8	Antonio Tiberi (ITA)	Team Bahrain Victorious	+ 0"
9	Sergi Darder (ESP)	Caja Rural–Seguros RGA	+ 0"
10	Thomas Pesenti (ITA)	Team Polti VisitMalta	+ 0"

General classification after Stage 5
Rank	Rider	Team	Time
1	Tobias Svarre (DEN)	Uno-X Mobility	18h 22' 53"
2	Antonio Tiberi (ITA)	Team Bahrain Victorious	+ 4"
3	Tim Wellens (BEL)	UAE Team Emirates XRG	+ 8"
4	Sam Maisonobe (FRA)	Cofidis	+ 19"
5	Adrien Boichis (FRA)	Red Bull–Bora–Hansgrohe	+ 39"
6	Dylan Teuns (BEL)	Cofidis	+ 41"
7	Emil Herzog (GER)	Red Bull–Bora–Hansgrohe	+ 41"
8	Johannes Kulset (NOR)	Uno-X Mobility	+ 41"
9	Steff Cras (BEL)	Soudal–Quick-Step	+ 47"
10	Aimé De Gendt (BEL)	Pinarello–Q36.5 Pro Cycling Team	+ 58"

=== Stage 6 ===
27 September 2026 — Samobor to Zagreb, 159.5 km (99.1 mi)

Stage 6 result
Rank	Rider	Team	Time
1	Davide Donati (ITA)	Red Bull–Bora–Hansgrohe	3h 14' 57"
2	Lorenzo De Longhi (ITA)	Cofidis	+ 0"
3	Paul Magnier (FRA)	Soudal–Quick-Step	+ 0"
4	Tim Torn Teutenberg (GER)	Lidl–Trek	+ 0"
5	Erlend Blikra (NOR)	Uno-X Mobility	+ 0"
6	Carl-Frederik Bévort (DEN)	Uno-X Mobility	+ 0"
7	Enrico Zanoncello (ITA)	Bardiani–CSF 7 Saber	+ 0"
8	Brody McDonald (USA)	Modern Adventure Pro Cycling	+ 0"
9	Bastian Petrič (SLO)	Pogi Team Gusto Ljubljana	+ 0"
10	Sergi Darder (ESP)	Caja Rural–Seguros RGA	+ 0"

Final general classification
Rank	Rider	Team	Time
1	Tobias Svarre (DEN)	Uno-X Mobility	21h 37' 50"
2	Antonio Tiberi (ITA)	Team Bahrain Victorious	+ 4"
3	Tim Wellens (BEL)	UAE Team Emirates XRG	+ 8"
4	Sam Maisonobe (FRA)	Cofidis	+ 19"
5	Adrien Boichis (FRA)	Red Bull–Bora–Hansgrohe	+ 39"
6	Dylan Teuns (BEL)	Cofidis	+ 41"
7	Johannes Kulset (NOR)	Uno-X Mobility	+ 41"
8	Emil Herzog (GER)	Red Bull–Bora–Hansgrohe	+ 41"
9	Steff Cras (BEL)	Soudal–Quick-Step	+ 47"
10	Aimé De Gendt (BEL)	Pinarello–Q36.5 Pro Cycling Team	+ 58"

== Classification leadership table ==
In the 2026 CRO Race, four different jerseys were awarded. The general classification was calculated by adding each cyclist's finishing times on each stage, and applying time bonuses for the first three riders at intermediate sprints (three seconds to first, two seconds to second, and one second to third) and at the finish of mass-start stages; these were awarded to the first three finishers on all stages: the stage winner won a ten-second bonus, with six and four seconds for the second and third riders, respectively. The leader of the classification received a red jersey; it was considered the most important of the 2025 CRO Race, and the winner of the classification was considered the winner of the race.

Points for the mountains classification
Position	1	2	3	4	5	6	7	8
Points for Hors-category	20	15	10	8	6	4	3	2
Points for Category 1	12	8	6	4	2	0		
Points for Category 2	6	4	2	0				
Points for Category 3	3	2	1	0				

Additionally, there was a points classification, for which the leader was awarded a blue jersey. In the points classification, cyclists received points for finishing in the top 15 of each stage. For winning a stage, a rider earned 25 points, with 20 for second, 16 for third, 14 for fourth, 12 for fifth, 10 for sixth, and a point fewer per place down to 1 point for 15th place. Points towards the classification could also be won on a 5–3–1 scale for the first three riders, respectively, at intermediate sprint points during each stage; these intermediate sprints also offered bonus seconds towards the general classification as noted above.

There was also a mountains classification, the leadership of which was marked by a green jersey. In the mountains classification, points towards the classification were won by reaching the summit of a climb before other cyclists. Each climb was marked as either hors, first, second, or third-category, with more points available for the higher-categorized climbs.

The fourth and final jersey represented the young rider classification, and its leadership was marked by a white jersey. This was decided in the same way as the general classification, but only riders born after 1 January 2003 (i.e., under 23 years of age at the beginning of the year) were eligible to be ranked in the classification. There was also a team classification, in which the times of the best three cyclists per team on each stage were added together; the leading team at the end of the race was the team with the lowest total time.

Classification leadership by stage
Stage	Winner	General classification	Points classification	Mountains classification	Young rider classification	Team classification
1	Juan Sebastián Molano	Juan Sebastián Molano	Juan Sebastián Molano (Note: On stage 2, Tim Torn Teutenberg, who was third in the points classification, wore the blue jersey, because first-placed Juan Sebastián Molano wore the red jersey as the leader of the general classification and Paul Magnier wore the white jersey as the leader of the young rider classification. On stage 3, Carl-Frederik Bévort, who was second in the points classification, wore the blue jersey, because first-placed Juan Sebastián Molano wore the red jersey as the leader of the general classification.)	Jon Agirre	Paul Magnier	Team Bahrain Victorious
2	Carl-Frederik Bévort	Juan Sebastián Molano	Juan Sebastián Molano	Gabriele Raccagni	Nicolas Gojković	Team Bahrain Victorious
3	Tobias Svarre	Tobias Svarre	Carl-Frederik Bévort	Antonio Tiberi	Tobias Svarre (Note: On stages 4 and 5, Johannes Kulset, who was second in the young rider classification, wore the white jersey, because first-placed Tobias Svarre wore the red jersey as the leader of the general classification. On stage 6, Emil Herzog will wear the white jersey for the same reason.)	Uno-X Mobility
4	Daniel Martínez	Tobias Svarre	Carl-Frederik Bévort	Antonio Tiberi	Tobias Svarre	Cofidis
5	Paul Magnier	Tobias Svarre	Carl-Frederik Bévort	Antonio Tiberi	Tobias Svarre	Cofidis
6	Davide Donati	Tobias Svarre	Carl-Frederik Bévort	Antonio Tiberi	Tobias Svarre	Cofidis
Final		Tobias Svarre	Carl-Frederik Bévort	Antonio Tiberi	Tobias Svarre	Cofidis

== Classification standings ==
Legend
Denotes the leader of the general classification	Denotes the leader of the mountains classification
Denotes the leader of the points classification	Denotes the leader of the young rider classification

=== General classification ===
Final general classification (1–10)
Rank	Rider	Team	Time
1	Tobias Svarre (DEN)	Uno-X Mobility	21h 37' 50"
2	Antonio Tiberi (ITA)	Team Bahrain Victorious	+ 4"
3	Tim Wellens (BEL)	UAE Team Emirates XRG	+ 8"
4	Sam Maisonobe (FRA)	Cofidis	+ 19"
5	Adrien Boichis (FRA)	Red Bull–Bora–Hansgrohe	+ 39"
6	Dylan Teuns (BEL)	Cofidis	+ 41"
7	Johannes Kulset (NOR)	Uno-X Mobility	+ 41"
8	Emil Herzog (GER)	Red Bull–Bora–Hansgrohe	+ 41"
9	Steff Cras (BEL)	Soudal–Quick-Step	+ 47"
10	Aimé De Gendt (BEL)	Pinarello–Q36.5 Pro Cycling Team	+ 58"

=== Points classification ===
Final points classification (1–10)
Rank	Rider	Team	Points
1	Carl-Frederik Bévort (DEN)	Uno-X Mobility	64
2	Tim Torn Teutenberg (GER)	Lidl–Trek	60
3	Paul Magnier (FRA)	Soudal–Quick-Step	55
4	Davide Donati (ITA)	Red Bull–Bora–Hansgrohe	46
5	Antonio Tiberi (ITA)	Team Bahrain Victorious	43
6	Lorenzo De Longhi (ITA)	Cofidis	39
7	Sam Maisonobe (FRA)	Cofidis	35
8	Daniel Martínez (COL)	Red Bull–Bora–Hansgrohe	28
9	Tim Wellens (BEL)	UAE Team Emirates XRG	28
10	Edoardo Zambanini (ITA)	Team Bahrain Victorious	28

=== Mountains classification ===
Final mountains classification (1–10)
Rank	Rider	Team	Points
1	Antonio Tiberi (ITA)	Team Bahrain Victorious	30
2	Lennard Kämna (GER)	Lidl–Trek	21
3	Jon Agirre (ESP)	Euskaltel–Euskadi	19
4	Tobias Svarre (DEN)	Uno-X Mobility	19
5	Gabriele Raccagni (ITA)	Team Polti VisitMalta	13
6	Tim Torn Teutenberg (GER)	Lidl–Trek	9
7	Tim Wellens (BEL)	UAE Team Emirates XRG	7
8	Filippo D'Aiuto (ITA)	MBH Bank CSB Telecom Fort	6
9	Sam Maisonobe (FRA)	Cofidis	6
10	Johannes Kulset (NOR)	Uno-X Mobility	6

=== Young rider classification ===
Final young rider classification (1–10)
Rank	Rider	Team	Time
1	Tobias Svarre (DEN)	Uno-X Mobility	21h 37' 50"
2	Johannes Kulset (NOR)	Uno-X Mobility	+ 41"
3	Emil Herzog (GER)	Red Bull–Bora–Hansgrohe	+ 41"
4	Dario Giuliano (FRA)	Team Polti VisitMalta	+ 1' 21"
5	Lorenzo Nespoli (ITA)	MBH Bank CSB Telecom Fort	+ 1' 28"
6	Dario Igor Belletta (ITA)	Team Polti VisitMalta	+ 8' 06"
7	Roei Edinger (ISR)	NSN Cycling Team	+ 11' 57"
8	Max van der Meulen (NED)	Team Bahrain Victorious	+ 12' 13"
9	Storm Ingebrigtsen (NOR)	Uno-X Mobility	+ 15' 40"
10	Jon Pritržnik (SLO)	Pogi Team Gusto Ljubljana	+ 16' 31"

=== Team classification ===
Final team classification (1–10)
Rank	Team	Time
1	(France) Cofidis	64h 55' 43"
2	(Germany) Red Bull–Bora–Hansgrohe	+ 20"
3	(Belgium) Soudal–Quick-Step	+ 52"
4	(Switzerland) Pinarello–Q36.5 Pro Cycling Team	+ 1' 18"
5	(Spain) Euskaltel–Euskadi	+ 2' 04"
6	Team Bahrain Victorious	+ 2' 16"
7	(Spain) Caja Rural–Seguros RGA	+ 3' 09"
8	(Italy) Team Polti VisitMalta	+ 4' 07"
9	(Norway) Uno-X Mobility	+ 5' 08"
10	(United Arab Emirates) UAE Team Emirates XRG	+ 12' 05"
