= CRO Race =

Croatian multi-day road cycling race

CRO Race (ex Tour of Croatia)
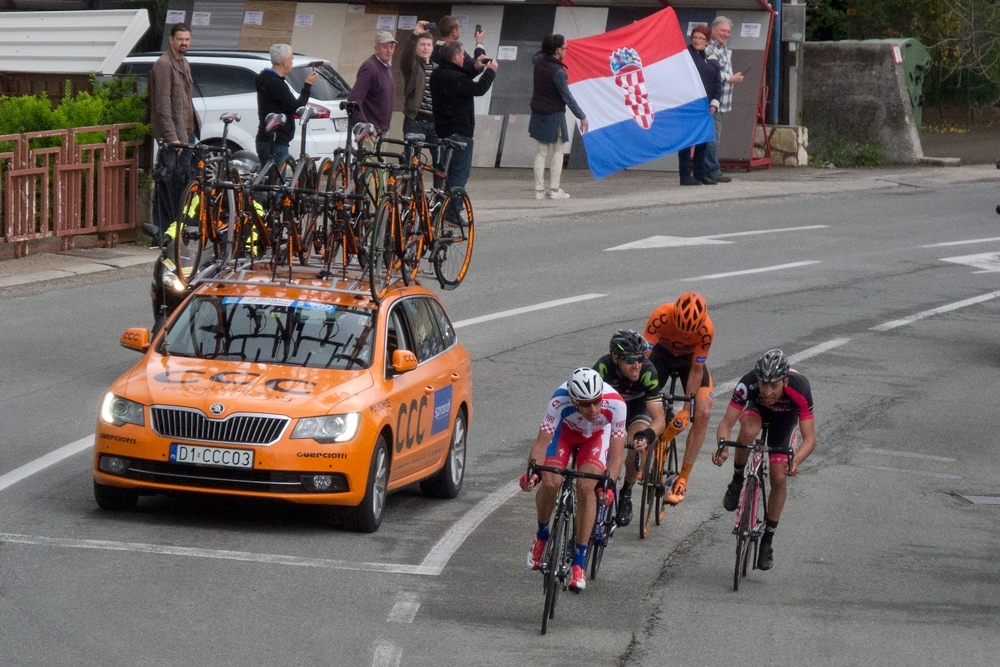

Race details
- Date: October
- Region: Croatia
- Discipline: Road
- Competition: UCI ProSeries
- Type: Stage race
- Race director: Vladimir Miholjević
- Web site: www.crorace.com

History
- First edition: 2015
- Editions: 11 (as of 2026)
- First winner: Maciej Paterski (POL)
- Most wins: Brandon McNulty (USA) (2 wins)
- Most recent: Tobias Svarre (DEN)

The CRO Race (formally: Tour of Croatia) is a men's road cycling stage race that takes place in Croatia since 2015. Since 2026, it has been on the UCI ProSeries calendar. It was previously part of the UCI Europe Tour as a UCI category 2.1 event. The event is organised by Top Sport Events of Vladimir Miholjević, a former professional cyclist. The race was originally held in April in the build-up to the Giro d'Italia, but from 2019 the race is held in September and October.

== History ==
=== 2015 ===
First edition of race was held as 2015 Tour of Croatia from 22 to 26 April 2015 and consisted of five stages over 838 km (520.7 mi).
Stages of 2015:

1. Makarska - Split
2. Šibenik - Zadar
3. Plitvice Lakes - Učka mountain
4. Pula - Umag
5. Sveti Martin na Muri - Zagreb

=== 2016 ===
The 2016 Tour of Croatia was held from 19 to 24 April 2016 and consisted of six stages over 1,005 km (624.5 mi).
Stages of 2016:

1. Osijek - Varaždin
2. Plitvice Lakes - Split
3. Makarska - Šibenik
4. Crikvenica - Učka
5. Poreč - Umag (Team time trial)
6. Sveti Martin na Muri - Zagreb

=== 2017 ===
The 2017 Tour of Croatia was held from 18 to 23 April 2017 and consisted of six stages over 1,031 km (640.6 mi).
Stages of 2017:

1. Osijek - Koprivnica
2. Trogir - Biokovo (Sveti Jure)
3. Imotski - Zadar
4. Crikvenica - Umag
5. Poreč - Učka (Poklon)
6. Samobor - Zagreb

=== 2018 ===
The 2018 Tour of Croatia was held from 17 to 22 April 2018 and consisted of six stages over 1,074 km (667.4 mi). The 2018 edition, was rated as the 2.HC for first time ever.
Stages of 2018:

1. Osijek - Koprivnica
2. Karlovac - Zadar
3. Trogir/Okrug - Makarska Riviera/Biokovo(Sveti Jure) (Stage was shortened due the bad weather)
4. Starigrad - Crikvenica
5. Rabac - Učka
6. Samobor - Zagreb

=== 2019 ===
The race was called off a week before the start, due to a dispute between the organizers, instead renamed version called 2019 CRO Race was held between from 1 to 6 October and consisted of six stages over 921 km (572.3 mi).
Stages of 2019:

1. Osijek - Lipik
2. Slunj - Zadar
3. Okrug - Makarska
4. Starigrad-Paklenica - Crikvenica
5. Rabac - Platak
6. Sveta Nedelja - Zagreb

=== 2020 ===
The 2020 edition was cancelled due to the COVID-19 pandemic.

=== 2021 ===
The 2021 CRO Race was held from 28 September to 3 October 2021 and consisted of six stages over 1,083 km (672.9 mi).
Stages of 2021:

1. Osijek - Varaždin
2. Slunj - Otočac
3. Primošten - Makarska
4. Zadar - Crikvenica
5. Rabac/Labin - Opatija
6. Samobor - Zagreb

=== 2022 ===
The 2022 CRO Race was held from 27 September to 2 October 2022 and consisted of six stages over 1,075 km (668.0 mi).
Stages of 2022:

1. Osijek - Ludbreg
2. Otočac - Zadar
3. Sinj - Primošten
4. Biograd na Moru - Crikvenica
5. Opatija - Labin
6. Sveta Nedelja - Zagreb

=== 2023 ===
The 2023 CRO Race was held from 26 September to 1 October 2023 and consisted of six stages over 972 km (604.0 mi).
Stages of 2023:

1. Primošten - Sinj
2. Biograd na Moru - Novalja
3. Otočac - Opatija
4. Krk - Labin
5. Crikvenica - Ozalj
6. Samobor - Zagreb

=== 2024 ===
The 2024 CRO Race was held from 1 October to 6 October 2024 and consisted of six stages over 916 km (569.2 mi).
Stages of 2024:

1. Vodice - Sinj
2. Biograd na Moru - Novalja
3. Otočac - Opatija
4. Krk - Labin
5. Ozalj - Karlovac
6. Sveta Nedelja - Zagreb

=== 2025 ===
The 2025 CRO Race was held from 30 September to 5 October 2025 and consisted of six stages over 861.5 km (535.3 mi).
Stages of 2025:

1. Split - Sinj
2. Biograd na Moru - Novalja
3. Gospić to Rijeka
4. Krk - Labin
5. Karlovac - Sveta Nedelja
6. Samobor - Zagreb

=== 2026 ===
The 2026 CRO Race was held from 22 to 27 September 2026 and consisted of six stages over 940 km (584.1 mi). The 2026 edition was rated as 2.Pro by UCI race classifications.
Stages of 2026:

1. Split - Seget
2. Biograd na Moru - Novalja
3. Krk - Labin
4. Pula to Rijeka
5. Karlovac - Sveta Nedelja
6. Samobor - Zagreb

== Classifications ==
The jerseys worn by the leaders of the individual classifications are:
- Red / White checkered Jersey – Worn by the leader of the general classification.
- Blue Jersey – Worn by the leader of the points classification.
- Green Jersey – Worn by the leader of the climbing classification.
- White Jersey – Worn by the best rider under 23 years of age on the overall classification.

== Overall winners ==
Year	Country	Rider	Team
2015	Poland	Maciej Paterski	CCC–Sprandi–Polkowice
2016	Croatia	Matija Kvasina	Synergy Baku
2017	Italy	Vincenzo Nibali	Bahrain–Merida
2018	Belarus	Kanstantsin Sivtsov	Bahrain–Merida
2019	Great Britain	Adam Yates	Mitchelton–Scott
2021	Great Britain	Stephen Williams	Team Bahrain Victorious
2022	Slovenia	Matej Mohorič	Team Bahrain Victorious
2023	Venezuela	Orluis Aular	Caja Rural–Seguros RGA
2024	United States	Brandon McNulty	UAE Team Emirates
2025	United States	Brandon McNulty	UAE Team Emirates XRG
2026	Denmark	Tobias Svarre	Uno-X Mobility
