= 2026 Tour of Guangxi =

2026 UCI World Tour, race 36 of 36

Race details
- Dates: 13–18 October 2026
- Stages: 6
- Distance: 1,036.3 km (643.9 mi)
- Winning time: 22h 22' 25"

Results
Jersey awarded to the overall winner	Winner	Jarno Widar (BEL)	(Lotto–Intermarché)
	Second	Tom Pidcock (GBR)	(Pinarello–Q36.5 Pro Cycling Team)
	Third	Louis Barré (FRA)	(Visma–Lease a Bike)
Jersey awarded to the points classification winner	Points	Paul Magnier (FRA)	(Soudal–Quick-Step)
Jersey awarded to the mountains classification winner	Mountains	Baptiste Veistroffer (FRA)	(Lotto–Intermarché)
Jersey awarded to the young rider classification winner	Young rider	Jarno Widar (BEL)	(Lotto–Intermarché)
	Team	(United Kingdom) Netcompany INEOS	

The 2026 Tour of Guangxi is a road cycling stage race that took place between 13 and 18 October 2026 in the Chinese province of Guangxi. It is the 7th edition of the Tour of Guangxi and the thirty-sixth and final event of the 2026 UCI World Tour.

== Cancellation of the women's race ==
The 2026 Women's Tour of Guangxi was scheduled for the 18th of October 2026, but was cancelled.

== Teams ==
Twenty-two teams, consisting of eighteen UCI WorldTeams, three UCI ProTeams, and the Chinese national team, participated in the race.

UCI WorldTeams

- Alpecin–Premier Tech
- Decathlon CMA CGM
- EF Education–EasyPost
- Groupama–FDJ United
- Lidl–Trek
- Lotto–Intermarché
- Movistar Team
- Netcompany INEOS
- NSN Cycling Team
- Red Bull–Bora–Hansgrohe
- Soudal–Quick-Step
- Team Bahrain Victorious
- Team Jayco–AlUla
- Team Picnic–PostNL
- UAE Team Emirates XRG
- Uno-X Mobility
- Visma–Lease a Bike
- XDS Astana Team

UCI ProTeams

- Cofidis
- Pinarello–Q36.5 Pro Cycling Team
- Tudor Pro Cycling Team

National teams

- China

== Route ==
Stage characteristics and winners
Stage	Date	Course	Distance	Type	Stage winner
1	13 October	Chongzuo to Chongzuo	149.4 km (92.8 mi)	Hilly stage	Paul Magnier (FRA)
2	14 October	Chongzuo to Jingxi	179.7 km (111.7 mi)	Hilly stage	Frits Biesterbos (NED)
3	15 October	Jingxi to Bama	212.3 km (131.9 mi)	Medium mountain stage	Milan Fretin (BEL)
4	16 October	Bama to Xian de Tian'e	165.7 km (103.0 mi)	Mountain stage	Paul Magnier (FRA)
5	17 October	Jinchengjiang to Jinchengjiang	170.1 km (105.7 mi)	Medium mountain stage	Milan Fretin (BEL)
6	18 October	Yizhou to NongLa	165.8 km (103.0 mi)	Hilly stage	Jarno Widar (BEL)
Total			1,017.7 km (632.4 mi)		

== Stages ==
=== Stage 1 ===
13 October 2026 — Chongzuo to Chongzuo, 149.4 km (92.8 mi)

Stage 1 result
Rank	Rider	Team	Time
1	Paul Magnier (FRA)	Soudal–Quick-Step	3h 00' 23"
2	Sam Welsford (AUS)	Netcompany INEOS	+ 0"
3	Max Kanter (GER)	XDS Astana Team	+ 0"
4	Oded Kogut (ISR)	NSN Cycling Team	+ 0"
5	Arvid de Kleijn (NED)	Tudor Pro Cycling Team	+ 0"
6	Matteo Milan (ITA)	Groupama–FDJ United	+ 0"
7	Erlend Blikra (NOR)	Uno-X Mobility	+ 0"
8	Luke Lamperti (USA)	EF Education–EasyPost	+ 0"
9	Lionel Taminiaux (BEL)	Lotto–Intermarché	+ 0"
10	Itamar Einhorn (ISR)	NSN Cycling Team	+ 0"

General classification after Stage 1
Rank	Rider	Team	Time
1	Paul Magnier (FRA)	Soudal–Quick-Step	3h 00' 13"
2	Sam Welsford (AUS)	Netcompany INEOS	+ 4"
3	Fredrik Dversnes (NOR)	Uno-X Mobility	+ 4"
4	Max Kanter (GER)	XDS Astana Team	+ 6"
5	Neilson Powless (USA)	EF Education–EasyPost	+ 6"
6	Patrick Gamper (AUT)	Team Jayco–AlUla	+ 8"
7	Oded Kogut (ISR)	NSN Cycling Team	+ 10"
8	Arvid de Kleijn (NED)	Tudor Pro Cycling Team	+ 10"
9	Matteo Milan (ITA)	Groupama–FDJ United	+ 10"
10	Erlend Blikra (NOR)	Uno-X Mobility	+ 10"

=== Stage 2 ===
14 October 2026 — Chongzuo to Jingxi, 179.7 km (111.7 mi)

Stage 2 result
Rank	Rider	Team	Time
1	Frits Biesterbos (NED)	Team Picnic–PostNL	3h 45' 19"
2	Paul Magnier (FRA)	Soudal–Quick-Step	+ 0"
3	Olav Kooij (NED)	Decathlon CMA CGM	+ 0"
4	Max Kanter (GER)	XDS Astana Team	+ 0"
5	Robin Froidevaux (SUI)	Tudor Pro Cycling Team	+ 0"
6	Jordi Meeus (BEL)	Red Bull–Bora–Hansgrohe	+ 0"
7	Matteo Moschetti (ITA)	Pinarello–Q36.5 Pro Cycling Team	+ 0"
8	Erlend Blikra (NOR)	Uno-X Mobility	+ 0"
9	Lionel Taminiaux (BEL)	Lotto–Intermarché	+ 0"
10	Oded Kogut (ISR)	NSN Cycling Team	+ 0"

General classification after Stage 2
Rank	Rider	Team	Time
1	Paul Magnier (FRA)	Soudal–Quick-Step	6h 45' 26"
2	Frits Biesterbos (NED)	Team Picnic–PostNL	+ 6"
3	Sam Welsford (AUS)	Netcompany INEOS	+ 4"
4	Fredrik Dversnes (NOR)	Uno-X Mobility	+ 10"
5	Max Kanter (GER)	XDS Astana Team	+ 12"
6	Olav Kooij (NED)	Decathlon CMA CGM	+ 12"
7	Neilson Powless (USA)	EF Education–EasyPost	+ 12"
8	Jhonatan Narváez (ECU)	UAE Team Emirates XRG	+ 13"
9	Martin Tjøtta (NOR)	Uno-X Mobility	+ 13"
10	Pau Miquel (ESP)	Team Bahrain Victorious	+ 14"

=== Stage 3 ===
15 October 2026 — Jingxi to Bama, 212.3 km (131.9 mi)

Stage 3 result
Rank	Rider	Team	Time
1	Milan Fretin (BEL)	Cofidis	4h 31' 55"
2	Frits Biesterbos (NED)	Team Picnic–PostNL	+ 0"
3	Jordi Meeus (BEL)	Red Bull–Bora–Hansgrohe	+ 0"
4	Fabio Jakobsen (NED)	Visma–Lease a Bike	+ 0"
5	Arvid de Kleijn (NED)	Tudor Pro Cycling Team	+ 0"
6	Sebastián Molano (COL)	UAE Team Emirates XRG	+ 0"
7	Joshua Giddings (GBR)	Lotto–Intermarché	+ 0"
8	Erlend Blikra (NOR)	Uno-X Mobility	+ 0"
9	Brady Gilmore (AUS)	NSN Cycling Team	+ 0"
10	Cyril Barthe (FRA)	Groupama–FDJ United	+ 0"

General classification after Stage 3
Rank	Rider	Team	Time
1	Frits Biesterbos (NED)	Team Picnic–PostNL	11h 17' 21"
2	Paul Magnier (FRA)	Soudal–Quick-Step	+ 0"
3	Max Kanter (GER)	XDS Astana Team	+ 10"
4	Sam Welsford (AUS)	Netcompany INEOS	+ 10"
5	Jasha Sütterlin (GER)	Team Jayco–AlUla	+ 10"
6	Fredrik Dversnes (NOR)	Uno-X Mobility	+ 10"
7	Jordi Meeus (BEL)	Red Bull–Bora–Hansgrohe	+ 12"
8	Olav Kooij (NED)	Decathlon CMA CGM	+ 12"
9	Neilson Powless (USA)	EF Education–EasyPost	+ 12"
10	Jhonatan Narváez (ECU)	UAE Team Emirates XRG	+ 12"

=== Stage 4 ===
16 October 2026 — Bama to Xian de Tian'e, 165.7 km (103.0 mi)

Stage 4 result
Rank	Rider	Team	Time
1	Paul Magnier (FRA)	Soudal–Quick-Step	3h 41' 55"
2	Cees Bol (NED)	Decathlon CMA CGM	+ 0"
3	Max Kanter (GER)	XDS Astana Team	+ 0"
4	Frits Biesterbos (NED)	Team Picnic–PostNL	+ 0"
5	Pau Miquel (ESP)	Team Bahrain Victorious	+ 0"
6	Sebastian Kolze Changizi (DEN)	Tudor Pro Cycling Team	+ 0"
7	Brady Gilmore (AUS)	NSN Cycling Team	+ 0"
8	Loe van Belle (NED)	Visma–Lease a Bike	+ 0"
9	Sebastián Molano (COL)	UAE Team Emirates XRG	+ 0"
10	Marijn van den Berg (NED)	EF Education–EasyPost	+ 0"

General classification after Stage 4
Rank	Rider	Team	Time
1	Paul Magnier (FRA)	Soudal–Quick-Step	14h 59' 06"
2	Frits Biesterbos (NED)	Team Picnic–PostNL	+ 10"
3	Max Kanter (GER)	XDS Astana Team	+ 16"
4	Cees Bol (NED)	Decathlon CMA CGM	+ 20"
5	Jordi Meeus (BEL)	Red Bull–Bora–Hansgrohe	+ 22"
6	Pau Miquel (ESP)	Team Bahrain Victorious	+ 24"
7	Lionel Taminiaux (BEL)	Lotto–Intermarché	+ 26"
8	Arne Marit (BEL)	Red Bull–Bora–Hansgrohe	+ 26"
9	Cyril Barthe (BEL)	Groupama–FDJ United	+ 26"
10	Kévin Vauquelin (FRA)	Netcompany INEOS	+ 26"

=== Stage 5 ===
17 October 2026 — Jinchengjiang to Jinchengjiang, 170.1 km (105.7 mi)

Stage 5 result
Rank	Rider	Team	Time
1	Milan Fretin (BEL)	Cofidis	3h 44' 18"
2	Matteo Moschetti (ITA)	Pinarello–Q36.5 Pro Cycling Team	+ 0"
3	Erlend Blikra (NOR)	Uno-X Mobility	+0"
4	Joshua Giddings (GBR)	Lotto–Intermarché	+0"
5	Jordi Meeus (BEL)	Red Bull–Bora–Hansgrohe	+0"
6	Max Kanter (GER)	XDS Astana Team	+0"
7	Sam Welsford (AUS)	Netcompany INEOS	+0"
8	Arvid de Kleijn (NED)	Tudor Pro Cycling Team	+0"
9	Cees Bol (NED)	Decathlon CMA CGM	+0"
10	Oded Kogut (ISR)	NSN Cycling Team	+ 0"

General Classification after Stage 5
Rank	Rider	Team	Time
1	Paul Magnier (FRA)	Soudal–Quick-Step	18h 43' 24"
2	Frits Biesterbos (NED)	Team Picnic–PostNL	+ 10"
3	Max Kanter (GER)	XDS Astana Team	+ 16"
4	Jasha Sütterlin (GER)	Team Jayco–AlUla	+ 18"
5	Jhonatan Narváez (ECU)	UAE Team Emirates XRG	+ 19"
6	Cees Bol (NED)	Decathlon CMA CGM	+ 20"
7	Enzo Paleni (FRA)	Groupama–FDJ United	+ 20"
8	Jordi Meeus (BEL)	Red Bull–Bora–Hansgrohe	+ 22"
9	Neilson Powless (USA)	EF Education–EasyPost	+ 22"
10	Martin Tjøtta (NOR)	Uno-X Mobility	+ 23"

=== Stage 6 ===
18 October 2026 — Yizhou to NongLa, 165.8 km (103.0 mi)

Stage 6 result
Rank	Rider	Team	Time
1	Jarno Widar (BEL)	Lotto–Intermarché	3h 39' 05"
2	Tom Pidcock (GBR)	Pinarello–Q36.5 Pro Cycling Team	+ 6"
3	Louis Barré (FRA)	Visma–Lease a Bike	+ 10"
4	Marco Brenner (GER)	Tudor Pro Cycling Team	+ 11"
5	Martin Tjøtta (NOR)	Uno-X Mobility	+ 15"
6	Juan Ayuso (SPA)	Lidl–Trek	+ 16"
7	Peter Øxenberg (DEN)	Netcompany INEOS	+ 19"
8	Clément Braz Afonso (FRA)	Groupama–FDJ United	+ 21"
9	Afonso Eulálio (POR)	Team Bahrain Victorious	+ 21"
10	Maxim Van Gils (BEL)	Red Bull–Bora–Hansgrohe	+ 23"

Final General Classification
Rank	Rider	Team	Time
1	Jarno Widar (BEL)	Lotto–Intermarché	22h 22' 45"
2	Tom Pidcock (GBR)	Pinarello–Q36.5 Pro Cycling Team	+ 9"
3	Louis Barré (FRA)	Visma–Lease a Bike	+ 16"
4	Marco Brenner (GER)	Tudor Pro Cycling Team	+ 21"
5	Martin Tjøtta (NOR)	Uno-X Mobility	+ 22"
6	Juan Ayuso (SPA)	Lidl–Trek	+ 26"
7	Jhonatan Narváez (ECU)	UAE Team Emirates XRG	+ 29"
8	Afonso Eulálio (POR)	Team Bahrain Victorious	+ 31"
9	Clément Braz Afonso (FRA)	Groupama–FDJ United	+ 31"
10	Maxim Van Gils (BEL)	Red Bull–Bora–Hansgrohe	+ 33"

== Classification leadership ==
Classification leadership by stage
Stage	Winner	General classification	Points classification	Mountains classification	Young rider classification	Team classification
1	Paul Magnier	Paul Magnier	Paul Magnier	not awarded	Paul Magnier	NSN Cycling Team
2	Frits Biesterbos	Paul Magnier	Paul Magnier	Afonso Eulálio	Paul Magnier	NSN Cycling Team
3	Milan Fretin	Frits Biesterbos	Frits Biesterbos	Wang Ruidong	Frits Biesterbos	NSN Cycling Team
4	Paul Magnier	Paul Magnier	Paul Magnier	Baptiste Veistroffer	Paul Magnier	NSN Cycling Team
5	Milan Fretin	Paul Magnier	Paul Magnier	Baptiste Veistroffer	Paul Magnier	NSN Cycling Team
6	Jarno Widar	Jarno Widar	Paul Magnier	Baptiste Veistroffer	Jarno Widar	Netcompany INEOS
Final		Jarno Widar	Paul Magnier	Baptiste Veistroffer	Jarno Widar	Netcompany INEOS

== Classification standings ==
Legend
General classification	Denotes the leader of the general classification	Mountain classification	Denotes the leader of the mountains classification
Points classification	Denotes the leader of the points classification	Young rider classification	Denotes the leader of the Young rider classification

=== General classification ===
Result
Rank	Rider	Team	Time
1	Jarno Widar (BEL)	Lotto–Intermarché	22h 22' 45"
2	Tom Pidcock (GBR)	Pinarello–Q36.5 Pro Cycling Team	+ 9"
3	Louis Barré (FRA)	Visma–Lease a Bike	+ 16"
4	Marco Brenner (GER)	Tudor Pro Cycling Team	+ 21"
5	Martin Tjøtta (NOR)	Uno-X Mobility	+ 22"
6	Juan Ayuso (SPA)	Lidl–Trek	+ 26"
7	Jhonatan Narváez (ECU)	UAE Team Emirates XRG	+ 29"
8	Afonso Eulálio (POR)	Team Bahrain Victorious	+ 31"
9	Clément Braz Afonso (FRA)	Groupama–FDJ United	+ 31"
10	Maxim Van Gils (BEL)	Red Bull–Bora–Hansgrohe	+ 33"

=== Points classification ===
Result
Rank	Rider	Team	Points
1	Paul Magnier (FRA)	Soudal–Quick-Step	40
2	Frits Biesterbos (NED)	Team Picnic–PostNL	32
3	Max Kanter (GER)	XDS Astana Team	32
4	Milan Fretin (BEL)	Cofidis	30
5	Jordi Meeus (BEL)	Red Bull–Bora–Hansgrohe	19
6	Erlend Blikra (NOR)	Uno-X Mobility	18
7	Jasha Sütterlin (GER)	Team Jayco–AlUla	16
8	Jarno Widar (BEL)	Lotto–Intermarché	15
9	Arvid de Kleijn (NED)	Tudor Pro Cycling Team	15
10	Jhonatan Narváez (ECU)	Uno-X Mobility	14

=== Mountains classification ===
Result
Rank	Rider	Team	Points
1	Baptiste Veistroffer (FRA)	Lotto–Intermarché	46
2	Peter Øxenberg (DEN)	Netcompany INEOS	20
3	Dries De Bondt (BEL)	Team Jayco–AlUla	16
4	Javier Romo (SPA)	Movistar Team	15
5	Wang Ruidong (CHN)	China	12
6	Afonso Eulálio (POR)	Team Bahrain Victorious	10
7	Tobias Bayer (AUT)	Alpecin–Premier Tech	10
8	Jarno Widar (BEL)	Lotto–Intermarché	10
9	Robbe Ghys (BEL)	Decathlon CMA CGM	8
10	Brandon Rivera (COL)	Netcompany INEOS	7

=== Young rider classification ===
Result
Rank	Rider	Team	Time
1	Jarno Widar (BEL)	Lotto–Intermarché	22h 22' 45"
2	Marco Brenner (GER)	Tudor Pro Cycling Team	+ 21"
3	Martin Tjøtta (NOR)	Uno-X Mobility	+ 22"
4	Juan Ayuso (SPA)	Lidl–Trek	+ 26"
5	Afonso Eulálio (POR)	Team Bahrain Victorious	+ 31"
6	Kévin Vauquelin (FRA)	Netcompany INEOS	+ 40"
7	Andrew August (USA)	Netcompany INEOS	+ 42"
8	Alessandro Pinarello (ITA)	NSN Cycling Team	+ 46"
9	Léo Bisiaux (FRA)	Decathlon CMA CGM	+ 50"
10	Tobias Svarre (DEN)	Uno-X Mobility	+ 53"

=== Team classification ===
Result
Rank	Team	Time
1	(United Kingdom) Netcompany INEOS	67h 10' 06"
2	(Norway) Uno-X Mobility	+ 9"
3	(Germany) Red Bull–Bora–Hansgrohe	+ 27"
4	(Netherlands) Visma–Lease a Bike	+ 1' 09"
5	(Spain) Movistar Team	+ 1' 21"
6	(Kazakhstan) XDS Astana Team	+ 1' 50"
7	(Australia) Team Jayco–AlUla	+ 2' 36"
8	(France) Groupama–FDJ United	+ 2' 49"
9	(Switzerland) Pinarello–Q36.5 Pro Cycling Team	+ 2' 52"
10	(France) Decathlon CMA CGM	+ 3' 28"
