= 2026 Brussels Cycling Classic =

2026 UCI ProSeries
- Event poster with previous winner Tim Merlier

Race details
- Dates: 7 June 2026
- Stages: 1
- Distance: 206.3 km (128.2 mi)
- Winning time: 4h 32' 54"

Results
	Winner	Jordi Meeus (BEL)	(Red Bull–Bora–Hansgrohe)
	Second	Milan Fretin (BEL)	(Cofidis)
	Third	Biniam Girmay (ERI)	(NSN Cycling Team)

The 2026 Brussels Cycling Classic is the 106th edition of the Brussels Cycling Classic road cycling one day race. It is being held on 7 June 2026 as part of the 2026 UCI ProSeries calendar.

== Teams ==
Eleven UCI WorldTeams and nine UCI ProTeams made up the twenty teams that participate in the race.

UCI WorldTeams

- Alpecin–Premier Tech
- EF Education–EasyPost
- Groupama–FDJ United
- Lotto–Intermarché
- NSN Cycling Team
- Red Bull–Bora–Hansgrohe
- Soudal–Quick-Step
- Team Jayco–AlUla
- Team Picnic–PostNL
- Uno-X Mobility
- XDS Astana Team

UCI ProTeams

- Caja Rural–Seguros RGA
- Cofidis
- MBH Bank CSB Telecom Fort
- Pinarello–Q36.5 Pro Cycling Team
- Team Flanders–Baloise
- Team Polti VisitMalta
- Team TotalEnergies
- Tudor Pro Cycling Team
- Unibet Rose Rockets

== Result ==
Result
Rank	Rider	Team	Time
1	Jordi Meeus (BEL)	Red Bull–Bora–Hansgrohe	4h 32' 54"
2	Milan Fretin (BEL)	Cofidis	+ 0"
3	Biniam Girmay (ERI)	NSN Cycling Team	+ 0"
4	Frits Biesterbos (NED)	Team Picnic–PostNL	+ 0"
5	Arvid de Kleijn (NED)	Tudor Pro Cycling Team	+ 0"
6	Tobias Müller (GER)	Unibet Rose Rockets	+ 0"
7	Anthony Turgis (FRA)	Team TotalEnergies	+ 0"
8	Toon Aerts (BEL)	Lotto–Intermarché	+ 0"
9	Anders Foldager (DEN)	Team Jayco–AlUla	+ 0"
10	Paul Penhoët (FRA)	Groupama–FDJ United	+ 0"
