= Circuit Franco-Belge =

Belgian one-day road cycling race

Race details
- Date: Early October
- Region: Belgium; France
- Local name: Circuit Franco-Belge (in French)
- Discipline: Road
- Competition: UCI ProSeries
- Type: Single-day; Prior to 2016: Stage-race
- Web site: www.circuitfrancobelge.com

History
- First edition: 1924
- Editions: 85 (as of 2026)
- First winner: Julien Perrain (FRA)
- Most wins: Julien Vervaecke (BEL); Alfons Ghesquiere (BEL); Cyriel Van Overberghe (BEL); Georges Dequesne (BEL); Benno Wiss (SUI); Robbie McEwen (AUS) (2 wins)
- Most recent: Corbin Strong (NZ)

The Circuit Franco-Belge is a single day cycling race held annually in Belgium and France. The race was previously known as the Tour de Wallonie-Picarde in 2011 and as the Tour de l'Eurométropole from 2012 to 2021. From 2005 to 2015 the Tour de l'Eurométropole was a 2.1-ranked stage race of the UCI Europe Tour. The race joined the UCI ProSeries as a 1.Pro event in 2021.

Since 2016, the event has transformed from a stage race to a single day 1.1 race and was included in the inaugural Belgian Road Cycling Cup. The race starts in Poperinge, West Flanders, and finishes in Tournai, Hainaut, and is now only run on Belgian soil.

== Winners ==
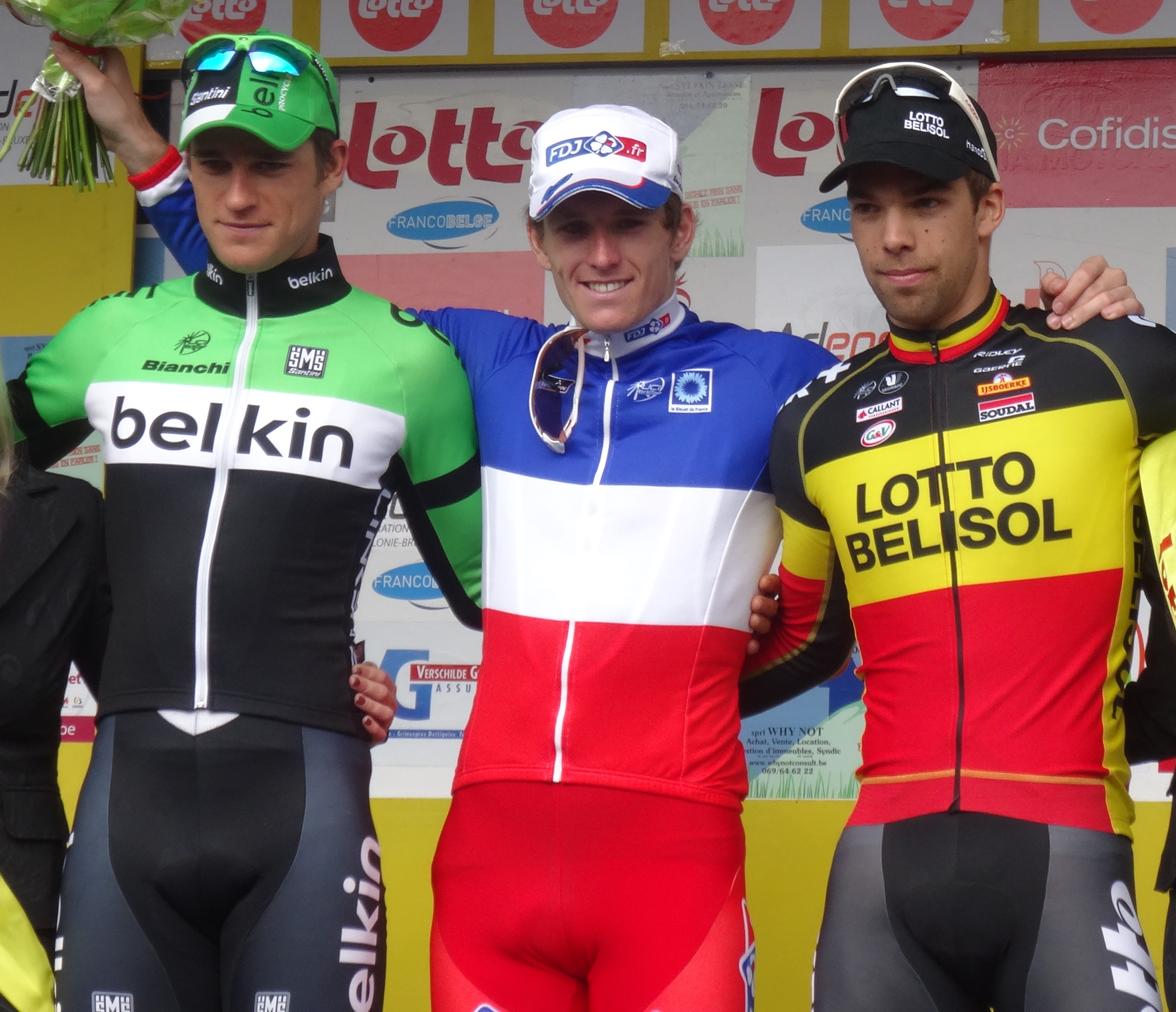
2014 : Theo Bos (3), Arnaud Démare (1) & Jens Debusschere (2).

Year	Country	Rider	Team
1924	France	Julien Perrain	
1925	Belgium	Julien Vervaecke	
1926	Belgium	Julien Vervaecke	
1927	France	Maurice Denamur	
1928	Belgium	Alfons Ghesquiere	
1929	Belgium	Alfons Ghesquiere	
1930	France	Henri Deudon	
1931	Belgium	Maurice Van Hee	
1932	Belgium	Gustave Beckaert	
1933	France	Raymond Debruycker	
1934	Belgium	Cyriel Van Overberghe	
1935	Belgium	Cyriel Van Overberghe	
1936	France	Maurice Deschamps	
1937	Belgium	Louis Van Daele	
1938	Belgium	Hector Lanssens	
1939	Belgium	Michel Hermie	
1940- 1954	No race		
1955	Belgium	Herman Decan	
1956	Belgium	Georges Dequesne	
1957	Poland	Edouard Klabinski	
1958	Belgium	François De Wagheneire	
1959	Belgium	Georges Dequesne	
1960	Belgium	Willy Bocklandt	
1961	Belgium	Laurent Christiaens	
1962	Belgium	Roland Aper	
1963	Belgium	Jan Nolmans	
1964	France	Robert Duponchel	
1965	France	Daniel Deprez	
1966	France	René Chtiej	
1967	France	Bern Delaurier	
1968	Belgium	Andre Dierickx	
1969	Belgium	Willy Van Mechelen	
1970	Belgium	Ronny Vanmarcke (victory shared with Ronny De Bisschop)	
1970	Belgium	Ronny De Bisschop (victory shared with Ronny Vanmarcke)	
1971	Belgium	Louis Dierckx	
1972	Belgium	Willy Govaerts	
1973	Belgium	Theo Dockx	
1974	Belgium	Serge Vandaele	
1975	Great Britain	David Wells	
1976	Belgium	Gery Verlinden	
1977	Belgium	Johan Huyghe	
1978	Belgium	Jaen-Pierre Vrancken	
1979	Belgium	Jan Bogaert	
1980	Belgium	Rudy Delehouzee	
1981	Belgium	Jozef Lieckens	
1982	Belgium	Rudy Dhaenens	
1983	Switzerland	Benno Wiss	
1984	Switzerland	Benno Wiss	
1985	Switzerland	Guido Winterberg	
1986	Switzerland	Othmar Häfliger	
1987	Belgium	Luc Govaerts	
1988	Belgium	Nico Roose	
1989	Soviet Union	Viatcheslav Ekimov	
1990	East Germany	Uwe Preißler	
1991	Great Britain	John Hughes	
1992	Belgium	Erwin Thijs	
1993	Germany	Sven Teutenberg	
1994	Latvia	Dainis Ozols	Trident–Schick
1995	Latvia	Romāns Vainšteins	
1996	Netherlands	Koos Moerenhout	Rabobank
1997	Belgium	Mario Aerts	Vlaanderen 2002–Eddy Merckx
1998	Denmark	Frank Høj	Palmans Ideal
1999	Denmark	Tayeb Braikia	Acceptcard Pro Cycling
2000	Italy	Daniele Nardello	Mapei–Quick-Step
2001	Belgium	Chris Peers	Cofidis
2002	Australia	Robbie McEwen	Lotto–Adecco
2003	Netherlands	Gerben Löwik	BankGiroLoterij
2004	France	Jimmy Casper	Cofidis
2005	Italy	Marco Zanotti	Liquigas–Bianchi
2006	Belgium	Kevin Van Impe	Quick-Step–Innergetic
2007	Belgium	Gert Steegmans	Quick-Step–Innergetic
2008	Spain	Juan Antonio Flecha	Rabobank
2009	United States	Tyler Farrar	Garmin–Slipstream
2010	Great Britain	Adam Blythe	Omega Pharma–Lotto
2011	Australia	Robbie McEwen	Team RadioShack
2012	Belgium	Jürgen Roelandts	Lotto–Belisol
2013	Belgium	Jens Debusschere	Lotto–Belisol
2014	France	Arnaud Démare	FDJ.fr
2015	France	Alexis Gougeard	AG2R La Mondiale
2016	Netherlands	Dylan Groenewegen	LottoNL–Jumbo
2017	Great Britain	Daniel McLay	Fortuneo–Oscaro
2018	Denmark	Mads Pedersen	Trek–Segafredo
2019	Belgium	Piet Allegaert	Sport Vlaanderen–Baloise
2020	No race due to COVID-19 pandemic		
2021	Netherlands	Fabio Jakobsen	Deceuninck–Quick-Step
2022	Norway	Alexander Kristoff	Intermarché–Wanty–Gobert Matériaux
2023	Belgium	Arnaud De Lie	Lotto–Dstny
2024	Eritrea	Biniam Girmay	Intermarché–Wanty
2025	Norway	Jonas Abrahamsen	Uno-X Mobility
2026	New Zealand	Corbin Strong	NSN Cycling Team

=== Wins per country ===
Wins	Country
45	Belgium
12	France
4	Great Britain; Netherlands; Switzerland
3	Denmark
2	Australia; Germany; Italy; Latvia; Norway
1	Eritrea; New Zealand; Poland; Spain; Soviet Union; United States
