= 2025 Dwars door het Hageland =

Cycling race

2025 UCI ProSeries
- Event poster with previous winners Lucinda Brand and Gianni Vermeersch

Race details
- Dates: 14 June 2025
- Stages: 1
- Distance: 180 km (111.8 mi)
- Winning time: 4h 00' 29"

Results
	Winner	Paul Magnier (FRA)	(Soudal–Quick-Step)
	Second	Rasmus Tiller (NOR)	(Uno-X Mobility)
	Third	Tibor Del Grosso (NED)	(Alpecin–Deceuninck)

The 2025 Dwars door het Hageland was the 20th edition of the Dwars door het Hageland road cycling one-day race, which was held on 14 June 2025 in the Belgian province of Flemish Brabant. It was a 1.Pro event on the 2025 UCI ProSeries calendar.

== Teams ==
Nine of the eighteen UCI WorldTeams, eleven UCI ProTeams, three UCI Continental and two UCI Cylo-cross teams made up the twenty-five teams that participated in the race.

UCI WorldTeams

- Alpecin–Deceuninck
- Arkéa–B&B Hotels
- Cofidis
- Intermarché–Wanty
- Soudal–Quick-Step
- Team Jayco–AlUla
- Team Picnic PostNL
- Visma–Lease a Bike
- XDS Astana Team

UCI ProTeams

- Caja Rural–Seguros RGA
- Euskaltel–Euskadi
- Israel–Premier Tech
- Lotto
- Q36.5 Pro Cycling Team
- Team Flanders–Baloise
- Team Novo Nordisk
- Team TotalEnergies
- Unibet Tietema Rockets
- Uno-X Mobility
- Wagner Bazin WB

UCI Continental Teams

- BEAT Cycling Club
- Metec–Solarwatt p/b Mantel
- Tarteletto–Isorex

UCI Cyclo-cross Teams

- Baloise Glowi Lions
- Pauwels Sauzen–Cibel Clementines

== Result ==
Result
Rank	Rider	Team	Time
1	Paul Magnier (FRA)	Soudal–Quick-Step	4h 00' 29"
2	Rasmus Tiller (NOR)	Uno-X Mobility	+ 3"
3	Tibor Del Grosso (NED)	Alpecin–Deceuninck	+ 9"
4	Quinten Hermans (BEL)	Alpecin–Deceuninck	+ 14"
5	Mike Teunissen (NED)	XDS Astana Team	+ 23"
6	David Haverdings (NED)	Baloise Glowi Lions	+ 28"
7	Jonas Abrahamsen (NOR)	Uno-X Mobility	+ 28"
8	Alex Colman (BEL)	Team Flanders–Baloise	+ 28"
9	Jasper Philipsen (BEL)	Alpecin–Deceuninck	+ 36"
10	Pier-André Côté (CAN)	Israel–Premier Tech	+ 38"
