= Jarno Widar =

Belgian cyclist

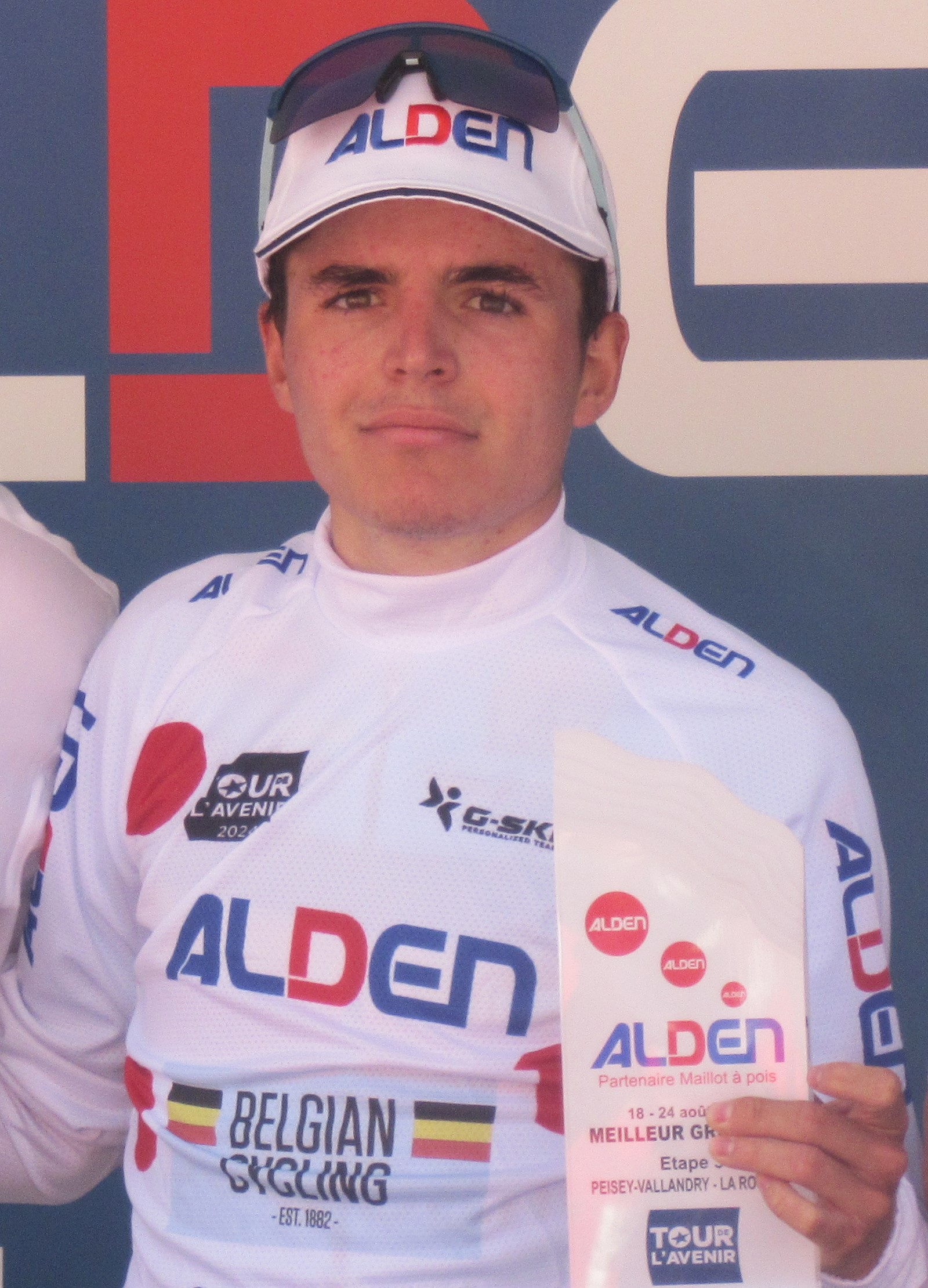
- Widar in 2024

Personal information
- Full name: Jarno Widar
- Born: 13 November 2005 (age 20) Hasselt, Belgium
- Height: 1.66 m (5 ft 5 in)
- Weight: 54 kg (119 lb)

Cycling career
- Sport: Cycling
- Current team: Lotto–Intermarché
- Discipline: Road
- Role: Rider
- Rider type: Climber

Amateur team
- 2022–2023: Crabbé Toitures–CC Chevigny Junior

Professional teams
- 2024–2025: Lotto–Dstny Development Team
- 2026–: Lotto–Intermarché

Major wins
- Stage races Tour of Guangxi (2026) One-day races and Classics Tre Valli Varesine (2026)
Medal record
Men's road bicycle racing
Representing Belgium
European Championships
Gold medal – first place	2025 Guilherand-Granges	Under-23 road race

Jarno Widar (born 13 November 2005) is a Belgian cyclist, who currently rides for UCI WorldTeam Lotto–Intermarché.

== Career ==
=== Junior career ===
In 2022, Widar as a first year junior won junior Nokere Koerse and Grand Prix Général Patton. In 2023, his final junior year, he won 14 races in his age category, including the Tour of Flanders U23 and Kuurne–Brussels–Kuurne, and 2 stages in the Giro della Lunigiana.

=== Lotto–Dstny Development Team (2024–25) ===
Widar won the 2024 Alpes Isère Tour and finished second in the Ronde de l'Isard and the Flèche Ardennaise, and in the U23 category he won the 1st mountain stage in the 2024 Giro Next Gen, taking the lead in the general classification, and eventually won the stage race. At the 2024 UCI Road World Championships U23 race, he finished 7th.

== Major results ==
2022
1st GP Général Patton
1st Nokere Koerse Juniors
1st 66ste Lenteprijs Mazenzele Juniors
1st Escanafles
1st GP Ernest Beco
1st Stage 2 Philippe Gilbert Juniors
2nd GP Luxembourg
4th Road race, National Junior Road Championships
4th Trofeo Comune di Vertova
7th Overall Saarland Trofeo
7th Overall Keizer der Juniores
7th Liège–Bastogne–Liège Juniores
2023
1st Road race, National Junior Road Championships
1st Overall Tour du Bocage et de l'Ernée 53

1st Mountains classification
1st Stage 3

1st Overall Philippe Gilbert Juniors

1st Stage 2

1st Tour of Flanders Juniors
1st La Classique des Alpes Juniors
1st Kuurne–Brussels–Kuurne Junioren
1st Trofeo Emilio Paganessi
1st Limburgse Pijl
1st GP Ernest Beco
Giro della Lunigiana

1st Points classification
1st Mountains classification
1st Stages 1a & 1b

1st Mountains classification, Course de la Paix Juniors
2nd Trofeo Comune di Vertova
3rd Overall Keizer der Juniores
8th Road race, UEC European Junior Road Championships
10th Overall Saarland Trofeo
2024
1st Overall Giro Next Gen

1st Young rider classification
1st Stages 3 & 6

1st Overall Giro della Valle d'Aosta

1st Young rider classification
1st Stage 4

1st Overall Alpes Isère Tour

1st Young rider classification

1st Ronde van Limburg
2nd Overall Ronde de l'Isard

1st Young rider classification

2nd Flèche Ardennaise
7th Road race, UCI Road World Under-23 Championships
2025
1st Road race, UEC European Under-23 Road Championships
1st Overall Ronde de l'Isard

1st Points classification
1st Young rider classification
1st Stage 2

1st Overall Giro della Valle d'Aosta

1st Points classification
1st Mountains classification
1st Stages 3, 4 & 5

1st Liège–Bastogne–Liège Espoirs
1st Flèche Ardennaise
1st Stage 3 Giro Next Gen
2nd Overall Tour de l'Avenir

1st Mountains classification
1st Stages 5 & 6a

2nd Overall Circuit des Ardennes

1st Young rider classification
1st Stage 3

7th Overall Tour des Alpes-Maritimes
2026 (3 pro wins)
1st Overall Tour of Guangxi

1st Young rider classification
1st Stage 6

1st Tre Valli Varesine
4th Figueira Champions Classic
6th GP Gippingen
