= Frits Biesterbos =

Dutch bicycle racer (born 2002)

Personal information
- Born: 14 February 2002 (age 24) Apeldoorn, Netherlands

Cycling career
- Sport: Cycling
- Current team: Team Picnic–PostNL
- Disciplines: Road; Gravel; Mountain bike
- Role: Rider

Amateur teams
- 2023: OWC & AWV de Zwaluwen
- 2024: RTV Oldenzaalse WCL

Professional teams
- 2024: BEAT Cycling Club (stagiaire)
- 2025: BEAT Cycling Club
- 2026–: Team Picnic–PostNL
Medal record
Representing the Netherlands
Men's gravel bicycle racing
World Championships
Silver medal – second place	2025 South Limburg	Elite

Frits Biesterbos (born 14 February 2002) is a Dutch cyclist, who currently rides for UCI WorldTeam Team Picnic–PostNL.

== Career ==
During his early career, Biesterbos focused primarily on mountain biking. He finished second in the Dutch elite cross-country championships in 2023. In 2024, he placed in the top ten of two rounds of the UCI Under-23 World Cup. He also represented the Netherlands at the European and World Championships. At the same time, he began to compete in more road races, joining BEAT Cycling Club as a stagiaire for the second half of the 2024 season. He joined the team fully in 2025, moving his focus entirely to road and gravel racing. In October, he attained a breakthrough result, winning the silver medal at the UCI Gravel World Championships, finishing ahead of Matej Mohorič. Two weeks prior, he also won the Dutch national gravel championships.

== Major results ==
=== Gravel ===
2025
1st National Championships
2nd UCI World Championships
UCI World Series

4th 3RIDES Gravel Race

=== Mountain bike ===
2023
2nd Cross-country, National Championships
2024
1st Hondsrug Classic

=== Road ===
2024
1st Wielerronde van Bolsward
1st Regio Kampioenschap Midden-Oost
2025
2nd GP Slovenian Istria
2nd I feel Slovenia VN Adria Mobil
10th Slag om Norg
2026 (1 pro win)
1st Stage 2 Tour of Guangxi
2nd Gooikse Pijl
3rd Münsterland Giro
3rd Veenendaal–Veenendaal Classic
4th Brussels Cycling Classic
7th Copenhagen Sprint
7th Classic Var
7th Kampioenschap van Vlaanderen

==== Grand Tour general classification results timeline ====
Grand Tour	2026
Giro d'Italia	—
Tour de France	DNF
Vuelta a España	

Legend
—	Did not compete
DNF	Did not finish
