= 2026 GP Miguel Induráin =

2026 UCI ProSeries

Race details
- Dates: 4 April 2026
- Stages: 1
- Distance: 203.9 km (126.7 mi)
- Winning time: 5h 00' 29"

Results
	Winner	Ion Izagirre (ESP)	(Cofidis)
	Second	Quinn Simmons (USA)	(Lidl–Trek)
	Third	Alex Baudin (FRA)	(EF Education–EasyPost)

The 2026 GP Miguel Induráin was the 72nd edition of the GP Miguel Induráin road cycling one day race, which was held on 4 April 2026, starting and finishing in Estella-Lizarra.

== Teams ==
Ten of the eighteen UCI WorldTeams, seven UCI ProTeams, and two UCI Continental teams made up the twenty teams that participated in the race.

UCI WorldTeams

- EF Education–EasyPost
- Lidl–Trek
- Lotto–Intermarché
- Movistar Team
- NSN Cycling Team
- Red Bull–Bora–Hansgrohe
- Team Bahrain Victorious
- Team Picnic–PostNL
- UAE Team Emirates XRG
- XDS Astana Team

UCI ProTeams

- Burgos Burpellet BH
- Caja Rural–Seguros RGA
- Cofidis
- Equipo Kern Pharma
- Euskaltel–Euskadi
- Team TotalEnergies
- Tudor Pro Cycling Team

UCI Continental Teams

- Efapel Cycling
- Anicolor / Campicarn

== Result ==
Result
Rank	Rider	Team	Time
1	Ion Izagirre (ESP)	Cofidis	5h 00' 29"
2	Quinn Simmons (USA)	Lidl–Trek	+ 6"
3	Alex Baudin (FRA)	EF Education–EasyPost	+ 10"
4	Alex Aranburu (ESP)	Cofidis	+ 10"
5	Andrea Bagioli (ITA)	Lidl–Trek	+ 10"
6	Christian Scaroni (ITA)	XDS Astana Team	+ 10"
7	Lennert Van Eetvelt (BEL)	Lotto–Intermarché	+ 10"
8	Clément Champoussin (FRA)	XDS Astana Team	+ 10"
9	Markel Beloki (ESP)	EF Education–EasyPost	+ 10"
10	Haimar Etxeberria (ESP)	Red Bull–Bora–Hansgrohe	+ 10"
