= 2025 Clásica de Almería =

2025 UCI ProSeries

Race details
- Dates: 16 February 2025
- Stages: 1
- Distance: 189.1 km (117.5 mi)
- Winning time: 4h 25' 47"

Results
	Winner	Milan Fretin (BEL)	(Cofidis)
	Second	Max Kanter (GER)	(XDS Astana Team)
	Third	Emilien Jeannière (FRA)	(Team TotalEnergies)

The 2025 Clásica de Almería is the 40th edition of the Clásica de Almería one-day road cycling race. It was being held on 16 February 2025 as a category 1. Pro race on the 2025 UCI ProSeries.

== Teams ==
Six of the 18 UCI WorldTeams, eleven UCI ProTeams and one UCI Continental team made up the eighteen teams that participated in the race.

UCI WorldTeams

- Arkéa–B&B Hotels
- Cofidis
- Intermarché–Wanty
- Movistar Team
- Team Jayco–AlUla
- XDS Astana Team

UCI ProTeams

- Burgos Burpellet BH
- Caja Rural–Seguros RGA
- Equipo Kern Pharma
- Euskaltel–Euskadi
- Lotto
- Q36.5 Pro Cycling Team
- Team Flanders–Baloise
- Team Polti VisitMalta
- Team TotalEnergies
- Tudor Pro Cycling Team
- VF Group–Bardiani–CSF–Faizanè

UCI Continental teams

- Illes Balears Arabay

== Result ==
Result (1–10)
Rank	Rider	Team	Time
1	Milan Fretin (BEL)	Cofidis	4h 25' 47"
2	Max Kanter (GER)	XDS Astana Team	+ 0"
3	Emilien Jeannière (FRA)	Team TotalEnergies	+ 0"
4	Arnaud De Lie (BEL)	Lotto	+ 0"
5	Giovanni Lonardi (ITA)	Team Polti VisitMalta	+ 0"
6	Fabian Lienhard (SUI)	Tudor Pro Cycling Team	+ 0"
7	Alberto Dainese (ITA)	Tudor Pro Cycling Team	+ 0"
8	Manuel Peñalver (ESP)	Team Polti VisitMalta	+ 0"
9	Iúri Leitão (POR)	Caja Rural–Seguros RGA	+ 0"
10	Orluis Aular (VEN)	Movistar Team	+ 0"
