= 2024 Brussels Cycling Classic =

2024 UCI ProSeries
- Event poster with previous winner Arnaud Démare

Race details
- Dates: 2 June 2024
- Stages: 1
- Distance: 218.4 km (135.7 mi)
- Winning time: 4h 53' 23"

Results
| | Winner | Jonas Abrahamsen (NOR) | (Uno-X Mobility) |
| | Second | Biniam Girmay (ERI) | (Intermarché–Wanty) |
| | Third | Kaden Groves (AUS) | (Alpecin–Deceuninck) |

The 2024 Brussels Cycling Classic was the 104th edition of the Brussels Cycling Classic road cycling one day race. It was held on 2 June 2024 as part of the 2024 UCI ProSeries calendar.

== Teams ==
Nine UCI WorldTeams and twelve UCI ProTeams made up the twenty-one teams that participated in the race.

UCI WorldTeams

- Arkéa–B&B Hotels
- Alpecin–Deceuninck
- Bora–Hansgrohe
- Cofidis
- Groupama–FDJ
- Intermarché–Wanty
- Soudal–Quick-Step
- Team dsm–firmenich PostNL
- UAE Team Emirates

UCI ProTeams

- Bingoal WB
- Caja Rural–Seguros RGA
- Equipo Kern Pharma
- Israel–Premier Tech
- Lotto–Dstny
- Q36.5 Pro Cycling Team
- TDT–Unibet Cycling Team
- Team Flanders–Baloise
- Team Novo Nordisk
- Team TotalEnergies
- Uno-X Mobility
- VF Group–Bardiani–CSF–Faizanè

== Result ==
Result
| Rank | Rider | Team | Time |
|---|---|---|---|
| 1 | Jonas Abrahamsen (NOR) | Uno-X Mobility | 4h 53' 23" |
| 2 | Biniam Girmay (ERI) | Intermarché–Wanty | + 4" |
| 3 | Kaden Groves (AUS) | Alpecin–Deceuninck | + 4" |
| 4 | Pascal Ackermann (GER) | Israel–Premier Tech | + 4" |
| 5 | Matteo Moschetti (ITA) | Q36.5 Pro Cycling Team | + 4" |
| 6 | Juan Sebastián Molano (COL) | UAE Team Emirates | + 4" |
| 7 | Filippo Fiorelli (ITA) | VF Group–Bardiani–CSF–Faizanè | + 4" |
| 8 | Lionel Taminiaux (BEL) | Lotto–Dstny | + 4" |
| 9 | Milan Fretin (BEL) | Cofidis | + 4" |
| 10 | Francisco Galván (ESP) | Equipo Kern Pharma | + 4" |
