= 2026 Münsterland Giro =

- 2026 UCI ProSeries

Race details
- Dates: 3 October 2026
- Stages: 1
- Distance: 190.7 km (118.5 mi)
- Winning time: 4h 08' 31"

Results
	Winner	Olav Kooij (NED)	(Decathlon CMA CGM)
	Second	Jordi Meeus (BEL)	(Red Bull–Bora–Hansgrohe)
	Third	Frits Biesterbos (NED)	(Team Picnic–PostNL)

The 2026 Münsterland Giro (known as the Sparkasse Münsterland Giro for sponsorship reasons) was the 20th edition of the Münsterland Giro road cycling one day race, held mostly in the titular region of northwest Germany on 3 October 2026.

== Teams ==
Twelve UCI WorldTeams, eight UCI ProTeams, and three UCI Continental teams made up the twenty-three teams that participated in the race.

UCI WorldTeams

- Alpecin–Premier Tech
- Decathlon CMA CGM
- EF Education–EasyPost
- Lidl–Trek
- Lotto–Intermarché
- NSN Cycling Team
- Red Bull–Bora–Hansgrohe
- Soudal–Quick-Step
- Team Picnic–PostNL
- Team Jayco–AlUla
- Visma–Lease a Bike
- Uno-X Mobility

UCI ProTeams

- Cofidis
- MBH Bank CSB Telecom Fort
- Pinarello–Q36.5 Pro Cycling Team
- Solution Tech NIPPO Rali
- Team Flanders–Baloise
- Team TotalEnergies
- Tudor Pro Cycling Team
- Unibet Rose Rockets

UCI Continental Teams

- Rembe / Rad-Net
- Team Lotto–Kern Haus Outlet Montabaur
- Team Storck–MRW BAU

== Result ==
Result
Rank	Rider	Team	Time
1	Olav Kooij (NED)	Decathlon CMA CGM	4h 08' 31"
2	Jordi Meeus (BEL)	Red Bull–Bora–Hansgrohe	+ 0"
3	Frits Biesterbos (NED)	Team Picnic–PostNL	+ 0"
4	Anthony Turgis (FRA)	Team TotalEnergies	+ 0"
5	Hugo Hofstetter (FRA)	NSN Cycling Team	+ 0"
6	Florian Dauphin (FRA)	Team TotalEnergies	+ 0"
7	Milan Fretin (BEL)	Cofidis	+ 0"
8	Jasper Philipsen (BEL)	Alpecin–Premier Tech	+ 0"
9	Søren Wærenskjold (NOR)	Uno-X Mobility	+ 0"
10	Arvid de Kleijn (NED)	Tudor Pro Cycling Team	+ 0"
