= Haimar Etxeberria =

Spanish cyclist (born 2002)

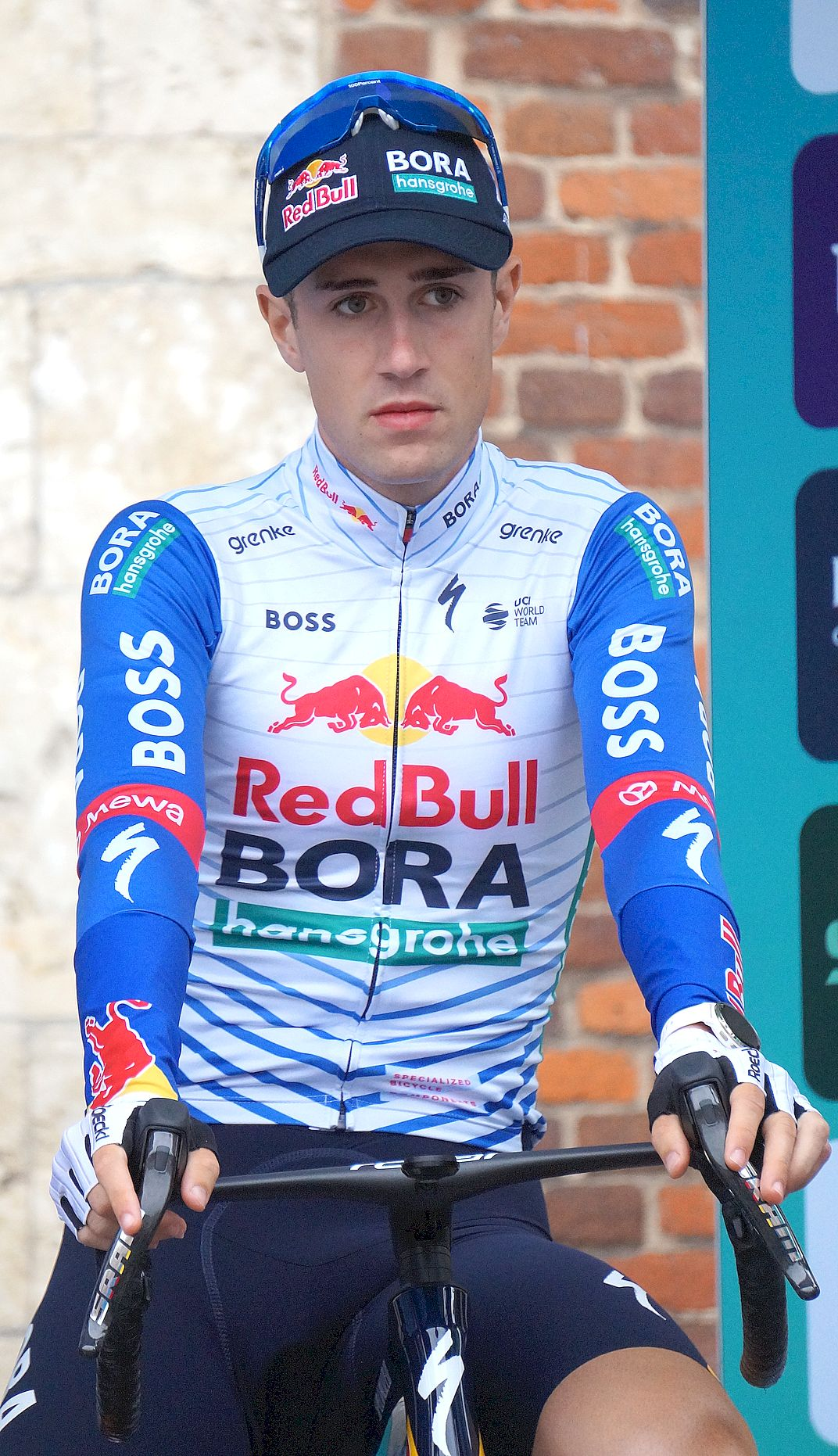

Personal information
- Full name: Haimar Etxeberria Ansalas
- Born: 8 September 2003 (age 23) Irun, Spain
- Height: 1.77 m (5 ft 10 in)
- Weight: 65 kg (143 lb)

Cycling career
- Sport: Cycling
- Current team: Red Bull–Bora–Hansgrohe
- Discipline: Road
- Role: Rider

Amateur teams
- 2020–2021: Buruntzazpi
- 2022: Equipo Amateur Caja Rural–Seguros RGA
- 2023: EOLO–Kometa U23
- 2024: Equipo Finisher–Kern Pharma

Professional teams
- 2024: Equipo Kern Pharma (stagiaire)
- 2025: Equipo Kern Pharma
- 2026–: Red Bull–Bora–Hansgrohe

Haimar Etxeberria Ansalas (born 8 September 2003) is a Spanish cyclist, who currently rides for UCI WorldTeam Red Bull–Bora–Hansgrohe.

Turning professional in 2025, he took his first pro win the same year at the Vuelta a Castilla y León in July. In November, Red Bull–Bora–Hansgrohe announced they had signed Etxeberria for the 2026 season.

== Major results ==
2023
1st Xanisteban Saria
1st Stage 3 Volta a la província de València
2024
1st San Gregorio Saria
1st Prueba Loinaz
1st Memorial Ángel Lozano
1st Stage 1 Vuelta al Bidasoa
2025 (1 pro win)
1st Vuelta a Castilla y León
4th Circuito de Getxo
5th Tour de Vendée
8th Circuit Franco-Belge
8th Prueba Villafranca de Ordizia
2026
10th GP Miguel Induráin
