= Paul Magnier =

French cyclist (born 2004)

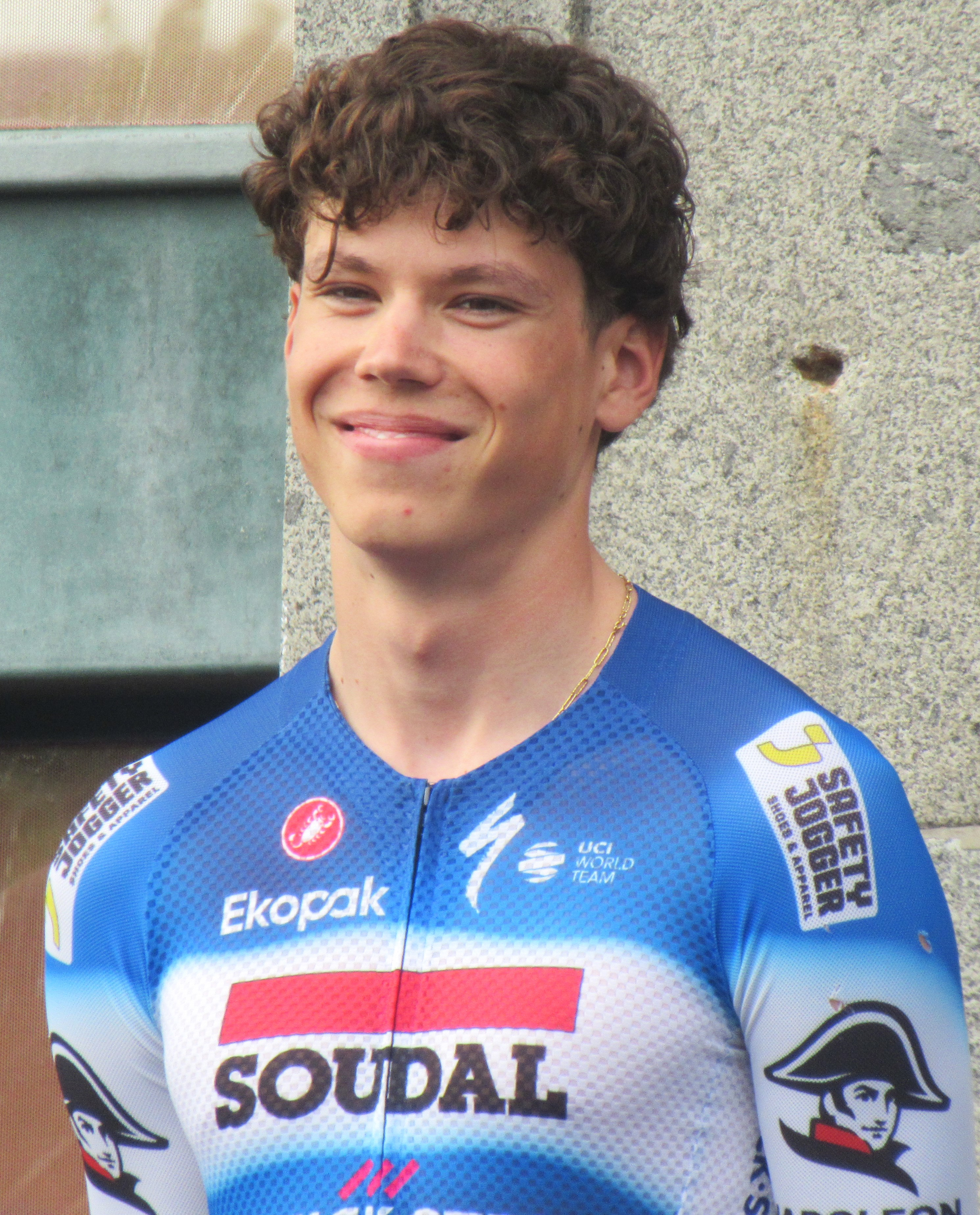
- Magnier in 2024

Personal information
- Born: 14 April 2004 (age 22) Laredo, Texas, United States
- Height: 1.87 m (6 ft 2 in)
- Weight: 70 kg (154 lb)

Cycling career
- Sport: Cycling
- Current team: Soudal–Quick-Step
- Disciplines: Road; Cyclo-cross; Mountain biking
- Role: Rider
- Rider type: Sprinter

Amateur team
- 2021–2022: Charvieu-Chavagneux IC Junior

Professional teams
- 2023: Trinity Racing
- 2024–: Soudal–Quick-Step

Major wins
- Grand Tours Giro d'Italia Points classification (2026) 3 individual stages (2026) One-day races and Classics Hamburg Cyclassics (2026) Dwars door het Hageland (2025) GP de Fourmies (2025)
Medal record
Men's road bicycle racing
Representing France
European Championships
Bronze medal – third place	2023 Drenthe	Under-23 road race
Men's mountain bike racing
World Championships
Bronze medal – third place	2022 Les Gets	Junior cross-country

Paul Magnier (born 14 April 2004) is a French cyclist who rides for UCI WorldTeam Soudal–Quick-Step.

== Early life ==
Magnier was born in Texas in the United States, moving to France at a young age.

== Career ==
Magnier won the Trofeo Ses Salines-Felanitx in January 2024, his first win with Soudal Quick-Step. After winning nineteen races in 2025, he won stage 1 of the 2026 Giro d'Italia in a reduced sprint after a late crash. This made him the first French rider in three years to wear the pink jersey. He went on to win two more stages during the race and the points classification overall, the second youngest rider in history to do so.

== Major results ==
=== Road ===
2022
1st Stage 2a Tour du Pays de Vaud
2nd Overall Giro della Lunigiana

1st Points classification
1st Stages 2b & 3

3rd La Classique des Alpes Juniors
4th Road race, UCI World Junior Championships
8th Overall Ain Bugey Valromey Tour

1st Stage 4

2023
3rd Road race, UEC European Under-23 Championships
2024 (5 pro wins)
1st Trofeo Ses Salines-Felanitx
Giro Next Gen

1st Points classification
1st Stages 2 & 4

Grand Prix Jeseníky

1st Points classification
1st Stage 2

Tour of Britain

1st Stages 1, 4 & 5

1st Stage 3 Tour of Oman
2nd Bretagne Classic
2025 (19)
1st Dwars door het Hageland
1st Grand Prix de Fourmies
1st Heistse Pijl
1st Elfstedenronde
Tour of Guangxi

1st Points classification
1st Stages 1, 2, 3, 4 & 6

Okolo Slovenska

1st Points classification
1st Stages 1, 2, 3 & 4

CRO Race

1st Points classification
1st Stages 1, 2, 3 & 5

1st Stage 4 Tour de Pologne
1st Stage 1 Étoile de Bessèges
2nd Omloop Het Nieuwsblad
2nd Figueira Champions Classic
2nd Le Samyn
3rd Hamburg Cyclassics
4th Bretagne Classic
2026 (15)
1st Hamburg Cyclassics
1st Binche–Chimay–Binche
1st Muur Classic Geraardsbergen
1st Hong Kong Cyclothon
Giro d'Italia

1st Points classification
1st Stages 1, 3 & 18
Held & after Stage 1

Tour of Guangxi

1st Points classification
1st Stages 1 & 4

Volta ao Algarve

1st Points classification
1st Stages 1 & 4

Okolo Slovenska

1st Points classification
1st Stages 1 & 2

1st Stage 4 Deutschland Tour
1st Stage 5 CRO Race
2nd Clàssica Comunitat Valenciana 1969
3rd Circuit Franco-Belge

==== Grand Tour general classification results timeline ====
Grand Tour	2025	2026
Giro d'Italia	DNF	115
Tour de France	—	—
Vuelta a España	—	—

=== Mountain bike ===
2021
1st Junior Stevena' di Caneva
Junior French Cup

3rd Les Menuires

2022
UCI Junior Series

1st Gränichen
2nd Banyoles
2nd La Thuile–Aosta
2nd Marseille–Luminy
3rd Guéret
5th Albstadt

Junior French Cup

1st Le Dévoluy

3rd Cross-country, UCI World Junior Championships

=== Cyclo-cross ===
2021–2022
2nd Junior Besançon
