= Jonas Abrahamsen =

Norwegian cyclist

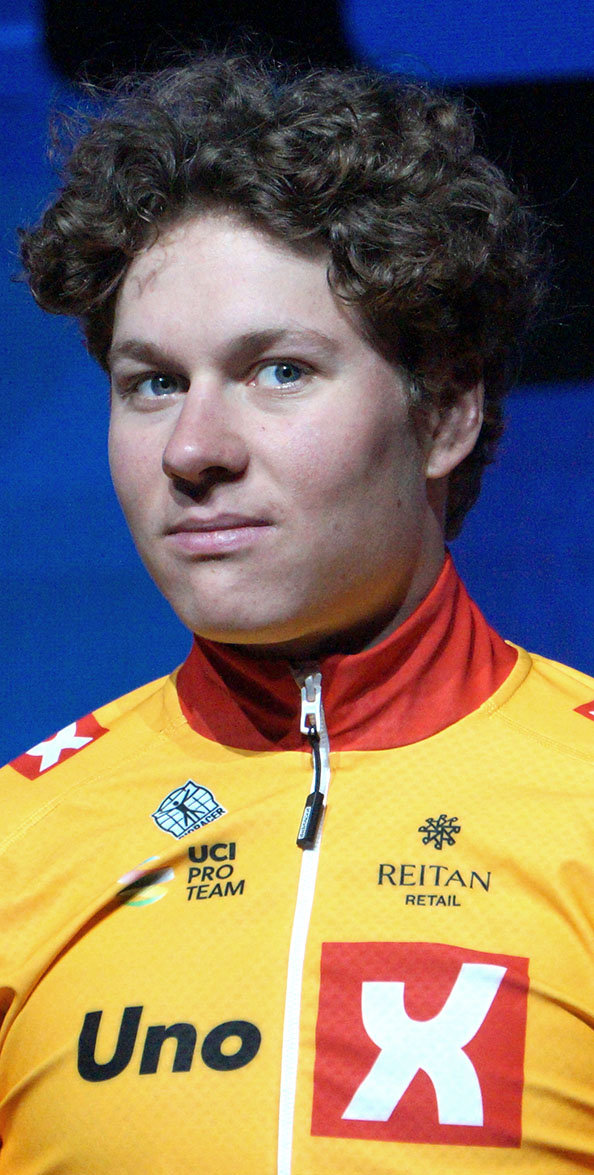
- Abrahamsen in 2023

Personal information
- Nickname: Grenlandsplogen (The Grenland Plow)
- Born: 20 September 1995 (age 31) Skien, Norway
- Height: 1.83 m (6 ft 0 in)
- Weight: 78 kg (172 lb)

Cycling career
- Sport: Cycling
- Current team: Uno-X Mobility
- Discipline: Road
- Role: Rider
- Rider type: Rouleur; Breakaway specialist

Amateur teams
- 2011–2013: Grenland SK
- 2015: Grenland SK

Professional teams
- 2014: Motiv3 Pro-Cycling Team
- 2014: Team Øster Hus–Ridley
- 2016–: Team Ringeriks–Kraft

Major wins
- Grand Tours Tour de France 1 individual stage (2025) One-day races and Classics Brussels Cycling Classic (2024) Circuit Franco-Belge (2025)

Jonas Abrahamsen (born 20 September 1995) is a Norwegian professional road racing cyclist, who currently rides for UCI WorldTeam Uno-X Mobility.

== Career ==
Abrahamsen turned professional in 2014 with Motiv3 Pro-Cycling Team, before moving to Team Øster Hus–Ridley six months later. He returned to club level in 2015 with Grenland SK, the squad he had ridden for as a junior. In 2016, he signed with Team Ringeriks–Kraft, which he has remained with since. In 2017, he won the L'Étape du Tour cyclosportive. In 2020, he took his first UCI level win on stage two of the Tour of Malopolska.

In 2023, he competed in the Tour de France, his first Grand Tour, where he finished third on stage 18 from the breakaway.

The following year was a breakthrough season for Abrahamsen, finishing second in the Dwars door Vlaanderen in March. In early June, he took his first pro win at the Brussels Cycling Classic, winning by four seconds after attacking four kilometers from the finish. A week later, he finished second in the Dwars door het Hageland. In July, he again rode for Uno-X in the Tour de France. He led the Mountains classification after the first stage, being the first Norwegian to do so, and held the jersey until Stage 11. He also led the Points classification during the opening stages.

During the 2025 Tour de France, Abrahamsen won the 11th stage in Toulouse after a 155 km breakaway, as well as the Combativity Award.

== Personal life ==
After seeking to be as light as possible as a young rider, leading to under-eating, Abrahamsen deliberately gained 20 kg. This led to him going through delayed puberty. He has since spoken out regarding the dangers of eating disorders.

== Major results ==
2012
5th Road race, National Junior Road Championships
2013
7th Overall Giro della Lunigiana
2017
1st L'Étape du Tour
10th Overall Grand Prix Priessnitz spa
10th Sundvolden GP
2018
6th Sundvolden GP
9th Overall Tour du Loir-et-Cher
2019
6th Sundvolden GP
2020
Tour of Malopolska

1st Mountains classification
1st Stage 2

2023
3rd Road race, National Road Championships
2024 (1 pro win)
1st Brussels Cycling Classic
1st Mountains classification, Étoile de Bessèges
2nd Dwars door Vlaanderen
2nd Dwars door het Hageland
5th Tro-Bro Léon
8th Tour of Leuven
Tour de France

Held after Stages 1–10
Held after Stages 2–4
Combativity award Stage 2 & 8

2025 (3)
1st Circuit Franco-Belge
1st Muur Classic Geraardsbergen
Tour de France

1st Stage 11
Combativity award Stage 11

2nd Maryland Cycling Classic
7th Dwars door het Hageland
7th Binche–Chimay–Binche
2026
3rd Road race, National Road Championships
5th E3 Saxo Classic
5th Paris–Tours
9th Overall Tour of Belgium
9th Gent–Wevelgem

=== Grand Tour general classification results timeline ===
Grand Tour	2023	2024	2025
Giro d'Italia	—	—	—
Tour de France	85	55	71
Vuelta a España	—	—	—

Legend
—	Did not compete
DNF	Did not finish
IP	Race in Progress
