= 2026 Hamburg Cyclassics =

Cycling race

2026 ADAC Cyclassics
2026 UCI World Tour, race 29 of 36

Race details
- Dates: 16 August 2026
- Stages: 1
- Distance: 205.3 km (127.6 mi)
- Winning time: 4h 17' 55"

Results
	Winner	Paul Magnier (FRA)	(Soudal–Quick-Step)
	Second	Mike Teunissen (NED)	(XDS Astana Team)
	Third	Laurence Pithie (NZL)	(Red Bull–Bora–Hansgrohe)

The 2026 Hamburg Cyclassics, known for sponsorship reasons as the ADAC Cyclassics, was a road cycling one-day race that took place on 16 August 2026 in Germany. It was the 29th edition of EuroEyes Cyclassics and the 29th event of the 2026 UCI World Tour.

== Teams ==
All eighteen UCI WorldTeams and four UCI ProTeams made up the twenty-two teams that participated in the race.

UCI WorldTeams

- Alpecin–Premier Tech
- Decathlon CMA CGM
- EF Education–EasyPost
- Groupama–FDJ United
- Lidl–Trek
- Lotto–Intermarché
- Movistar Team
- Netcompany INEOS
- NSN Cycling Team
- Red Bull–Bora–Hansgrohe
- Soudal–Quick-Step
- Team Bahrain Victorious
- Team Jayco–AlUla
- Team Picnic–PostNL
- UAE Team Emirates XRG
- Uno-X Mobility
- Visma–Lease a Bike
- XDS Astana Team

UCI ProTeams

- Cofidis
- Pinarello–Q36.5 Pro Cycling Team
- Team Tavira / Crédito Agrícola
- Tudor Pro Cycling Team

== Result ==
Result
Rank	Rider	Team	Time
1	Paul Magnier (FRA)	Soudal–Quick-Step	4h 17' 55"
2	Mike Teunissen (NED)	XDS Astana Team	+ 0"
3	Laurence Pithie (NZL)	Red Bull–Bora–Hansgrohe	+ 0"
4	Paul Penhoët (FRA)	Groupama–FDJ United	+ 0"
5	Henri Uhlig (GER)	Alpecin–Premier Tech	+ 0"
6	Milan Fretin (BEL)	Cofidis	+ 0"
7	Noah Hobbs (GBR)	EF Education–EasyPost	+ 0"
8	Søren Wærenskjold (NOR)	Uno-X Mobility	+ 0"
9	Huub Artz (NED)	Lotto–Intermarché	+ 0"
10	Arnaud de Lie (BEL)	Lotto–Intermarché	+ 0"
