= Seget Vranjica =

Village in Split-Dalmatia, Croatia

- Village
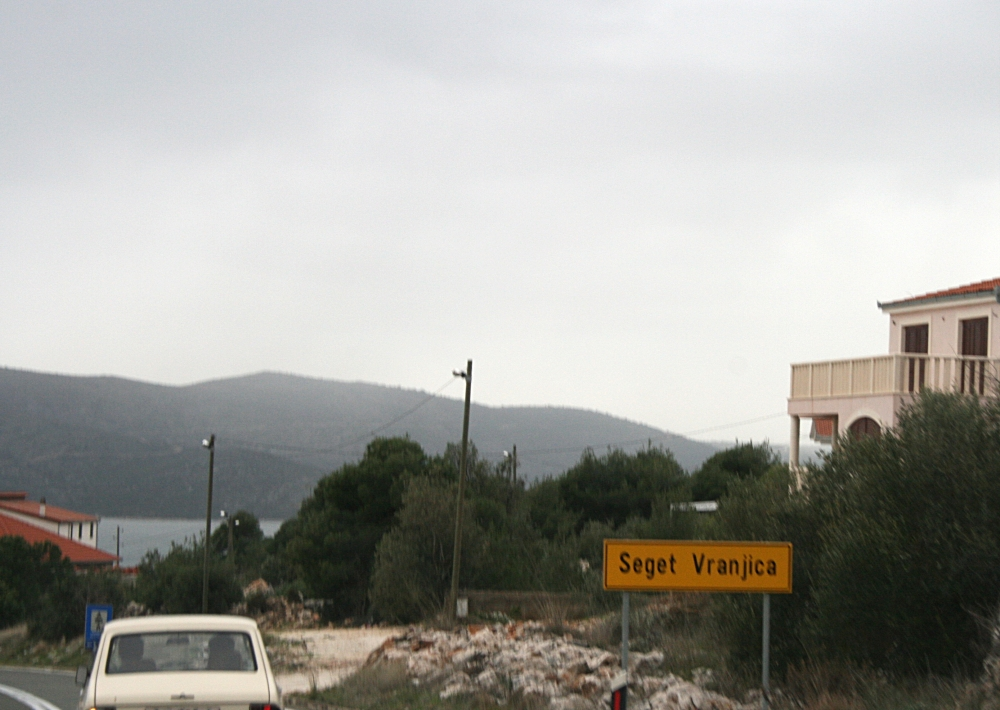
- Entrance to Seget Vranjica

- Location of Seget Vranjica within Croatia
- Coordinates: 43°30′36″N 16°11′11″E
- Country: Croatia
- County: Split-Dalmatia
- Municipality: Seget

Government
  - Municipality chief: Vinko Zulim (HDZ)

Area
  - Total: 4.0 km^{2} (1.5 sq mi)
- Elevation: 22 m (72 ft)

Population (2021)
  - Total: 1,023
  - Density: 260/km^{2} (660/sq mi)
- Time zone: UTC+1 (CET)
  - Summer (DST): UTC+2 (CEST)
- Postal code: 21218
- Area code: 021
- Website: www.tz-seget.hr/hr/12/seget-vranjica

Seget Vranjica is a village in the Split-Dalmatia County of Croatia. It is located on the Adriatic coast of Dalmatia, about 6 km west of Trogir, population 1,027 (2011). It is a tourist destination.

== Geography ==
Seget Vranjica lies mostly on a peninsula. On the east, it faces a forest called Medena and on the west is the Cape of Vranjica. The bay and port of Vranjica is on the northern side of the peninsula and on the south it faces the open coast. On the north, Seget Vranjica is protected by the hills and on the south is the Trogir channel with the Marina bay facing west.

== Location and transport ==
Seget Vranjica lies on the D8 road between the cities of Šibenik and Split and on the regional route which connects the towns of Marina and Trogir. The closest town to Seget Vranjica is Trogir which is located 6 km to the east and the closest major city is Split which is located 33 km to the east.

The exit and entrance to the A1 highway is located 15 km to the east and the Split Airport is located 10 km to the east. Seget Vranjica has a bus station which has a regular line with Trogir, Čiovo and the rest of the Seget municipality. In the summer, there is a regular boat line that works on a daily coastal route to Trogir.

== Economy ==
In the old days, the main source of income for the settlers of Seget Vranjica was fishing and agriculture. Tourism started becoming more active in the early 1980s and today it is the main source of income for a large majority of the population. In the last 20 years, there has been a real estate boom of renting houses and hotels. Fishing is still the main source of income for some people but it has been in a downfall for the last few decades.

Vranjica has 2 supermarkets, one in the centre of the village and one on the state road. There is one restaurant called Konoba Ribar that works all year. During the summer, numerous barrooms and restaurants open in the Seget Vranjica port.
