= 2025 UCI Gravel World Championships =

Gravel world championships in 2025

- Venue: Zuid-Limburg, Netherlands
- Date: 11–12 October 2025

The 2025 UCI Gravel World Championships were held on 11 and 12 October 2025 in the Zuid-Limburg region of the Netherlands, with a paved start in Beek and finishes in Maastricht. It was the fourth edition of the championships. Belgium's Florian Vermeersch won the elite men's race in a 18 km (11 mi) solo, while Lorena Wiebes won the elite women's title in a sprint finish.

== Course ==
The course featured three main parts: a paved start in Beek, multiple laps of a 50 kilometres (31 mi) loop that contained the majority of the gravel sectors (the elite men covered three and a half laps, the elite women two and a half), and a final run to Maastricht. The final 18 km (11 mi) included the Bronsdalweg ascent, roughly 1 km (0.62 mi) at 7-8% gradient, which was expected to be a key location for attacks.

== Pre-race favorites ==
Many gravel specialists were absent from the race due to scheduling conflicts with the Life Time Grand Prix in Arkansas, United States. Also missing were previous years champions Mathieu van der Poel and Kasia Niewiadoma-Phinney. Analysts at Cyclingnews.com identified Marianne Vos, Rosa Klöser, Lorena Wiebes, and Tiffany Cromwell as favorites in the elite women's race, as well as Tom Pidcock, Tim Merlier, Mads Würtz Schmidt, and Romain Bardet in the elite men's race.

== Medal summary ==
Event	Gold		Silver		Bronze	
Men's events
Men elite	Florian Vermeersch (BEL)	4h 39' 12"	Frits Biesterbos (NED)	+ 40"	Matej Mohorič (SLO)	+ 1' 23"
Women's events
Women elite	Lorena Wiebes (NED)	3h 58' 16"	Marianne Vos (NED)	s.t.	Silvia Persico (ITA)	+ 2"
