= 2025 Circuit Franco-Belge =

2025 Circuit Franco–Belge
2025 UCI ProSeries
- Event poster with previous winner Biniam Girmay

Race details
- Dates: 15 August 2025
- Stages: 1
- Distance: 208.1 km (129.3 mi)
- Winning time: 4h 54' 32"

Results
	Winner	Jonas Abrahamsen (NOR)	(Uno-X Mobility)
	Second	Corbin Strong (NZL)	(Israel–Premier Tech)
	Third	Eduard Prades (ESP)	(Caja Rural–Seguros RGA)

The 2025 Circuit Franco-Belge was the 84th edition of the Circuit Franco–Belge and the ninth edition since it became a one-day race. It was held on 15 August 2025 as part of the 2025 UCI ProSeries calendar.

== Teams ==
Eight UCI WorldTeams, twelve UCI ProTeams, and four UCI Continental teams made up the 24 teams that participated in the race.

UCI WorldTeams

- Alpecin–Deceuninck
- Arkéa–B&B Hotels
- Cofidis
- Intermarché–Wanty
- Movistar Team
- Team Jayco–AlUla
- Team Picnic–PostNL
- XDS Astana Team

UCI ProTeams

- Caja Rural–Seguros RGA
- Equipo Kern Pharma
- Euskaltel–Euskadi
- Israel–Premier Tech
- Lotto
- Q36.5 Pro Cycling Team
- Team Flanders–Baloise
- Team Polti VisitMalta
- Team TotalEnergies
- Tudor Pro Cycling Team
- Uno-X Mobility
- Wagner Bazin WB

UCI Continental Teams

- Soudal–Quick-Step Devo Team
- Tarteletto–Isorex
- Van Rysel–Roubaix
- VolkerWessels Cycling Team

== Result ==
Result
Rank	Rider	Team	Time
1	Jonas Abrahamsen (NOR)	Uno-X Mobility	4h 53' 00"
2	Corbin Strong (NZL)	Israel–Premier Tech	+ 0"
3	Eduard Prades (ESP)	Caja Rural–Seguros RGA	+ 0"
4	Marc Hirschi (SUI)	Tudor Pro Cycling Team	+ 0"
5	Alex Aranburu (ESP)	Cofidis	+ 0"
6	Clément Venturini (FRA)	Arkéa–B&B Hotels	+ 0"
7	Rasmus Tiller (NOR)	Uno-X Mobility	+ 0"
8	Haimar Etxeberria (ESP)	Equipo Kern Pharma	+ 0"
9	Markus Hoelgaard (NOR)	Uno-X Mobility	+ 0"
10	Fabio Christen (SUI)	Q36.5 Pro Cycling Team	+ 0"
