= Sindre Kulset =

Norwegian road cyclist

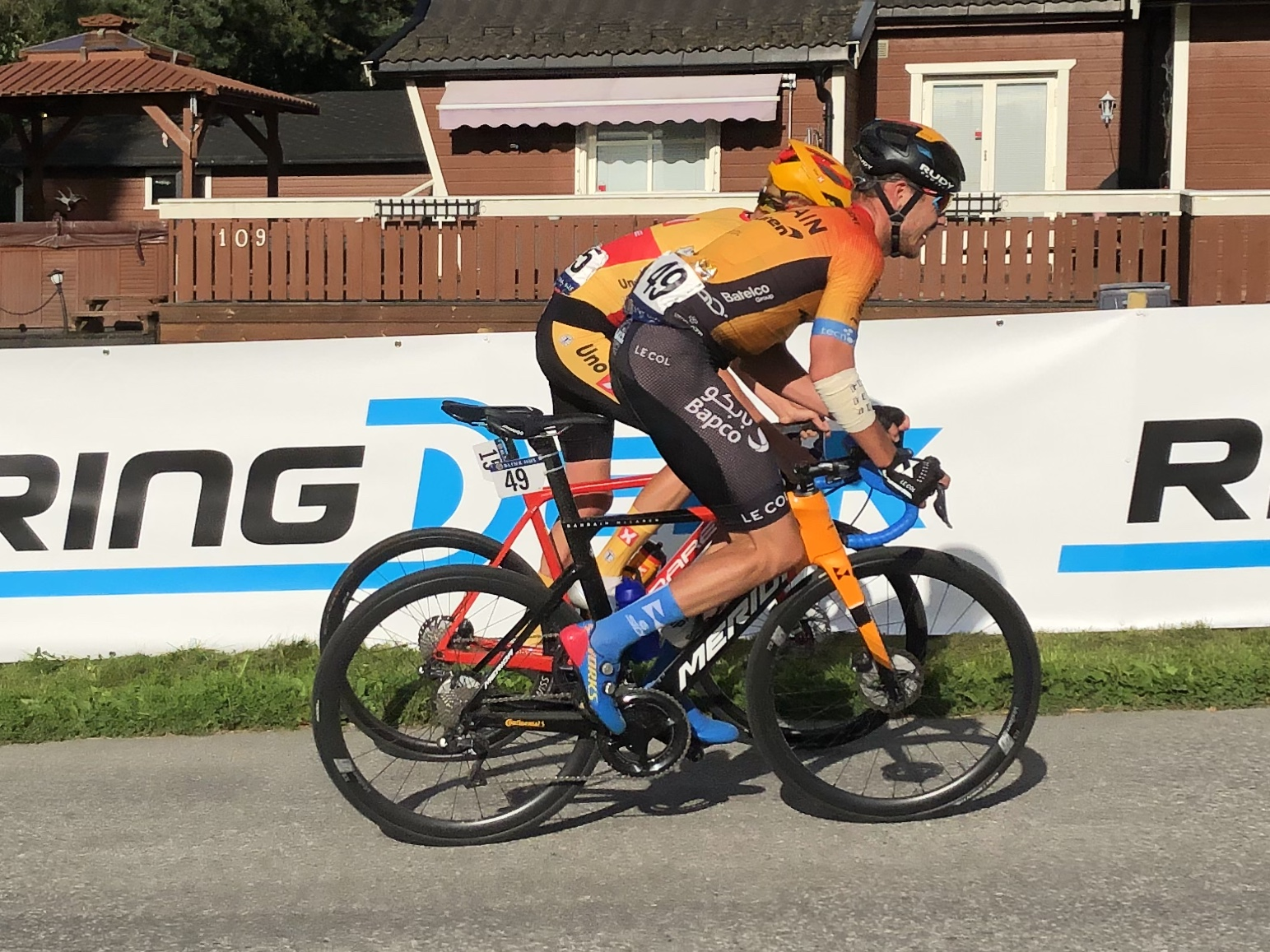
- Kulset in 2020

Personal information
- Full name: Sindre Marthinsen Kulset
- Born: 7 August 1998 (age 28) Oslo, Norway
- Height: 1.83 m (6 ft 0 in)
- Weight: 68 kg (150 lb)

Cycling career
- Sport: Cycling
- Discipline: Road
- Role: Rider

Amateur team
- 2015–2017: Ringerike SK

Professional team
- 2018–2024: Uno-X Norwegian Development Team

Sindre Marthinsen Kulset (born 7 August 1998) is a Norwegian cyclist, who last rode for UCI ProTeam Uno-X Mobility.

His brothers Kristian, Magnus and Johannes are also professional cyclists.

== Major results ==
2022
2nd Grand Prix Alanya
