= Maurice Denamur =

French cyclist

Personal information
- Born: 30 December 1895
- Died: 28 December 1957 (aged 61)

Cycling career
- Sport: Cycling
- Discipline: Road
- Role: Rider

Maurice Denamur (30 December 1895 – 28 December 1957) was a French racing cyclist. He rode in the 1928 Tour de France.
