= Kristian Kulset =

Norwegian road cyclist

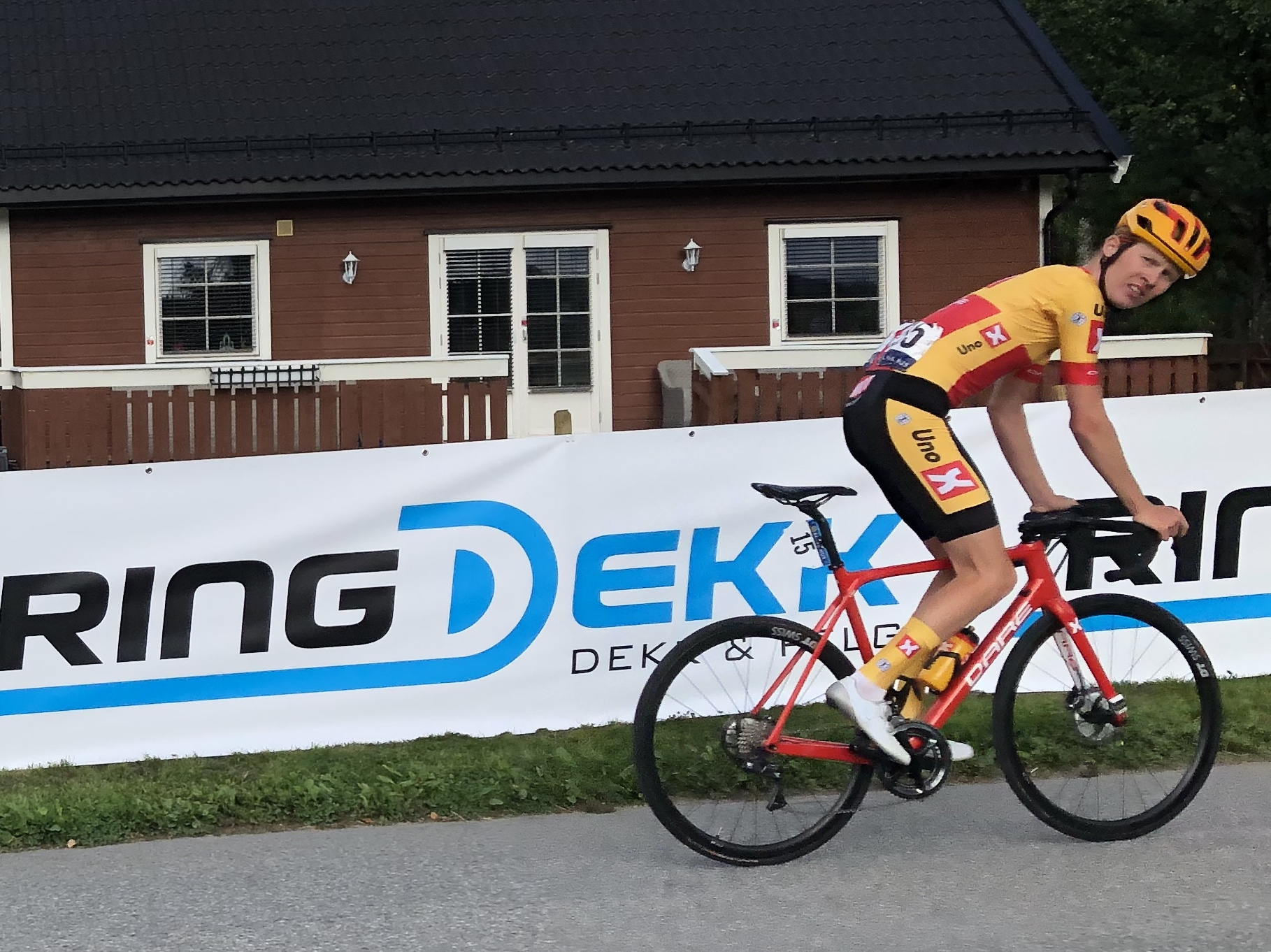
- Kulset in 2020

Personal information
- Full name: Kristian Marthinsen Kulset
- Born: 1 October 1995 (age 31) Oslo, Norway
- Height: 1.88 m (6 ft 2 in)

Cycling career
- Sport: Cycling
- Current team: Retired
- Discipline: Road
- Role: Rider

Amateur teams
- 2012–2013: Bærum OCK Junior
- 2014–2016: Ringerike SK

Professional team
- 2016–2022: Team Ringeriks–Kraft

Kristian Marthinsen Kulset (born 1 October 1995) is a Norwegian former cyclist, who competed as a professional from 2016 to 2022 for Uno-X Pro Cycling Team.

His brothers Sindre, Magnus and Johannes are also professional cyclists.
