= Milan Fretin =

Belgian cyclist

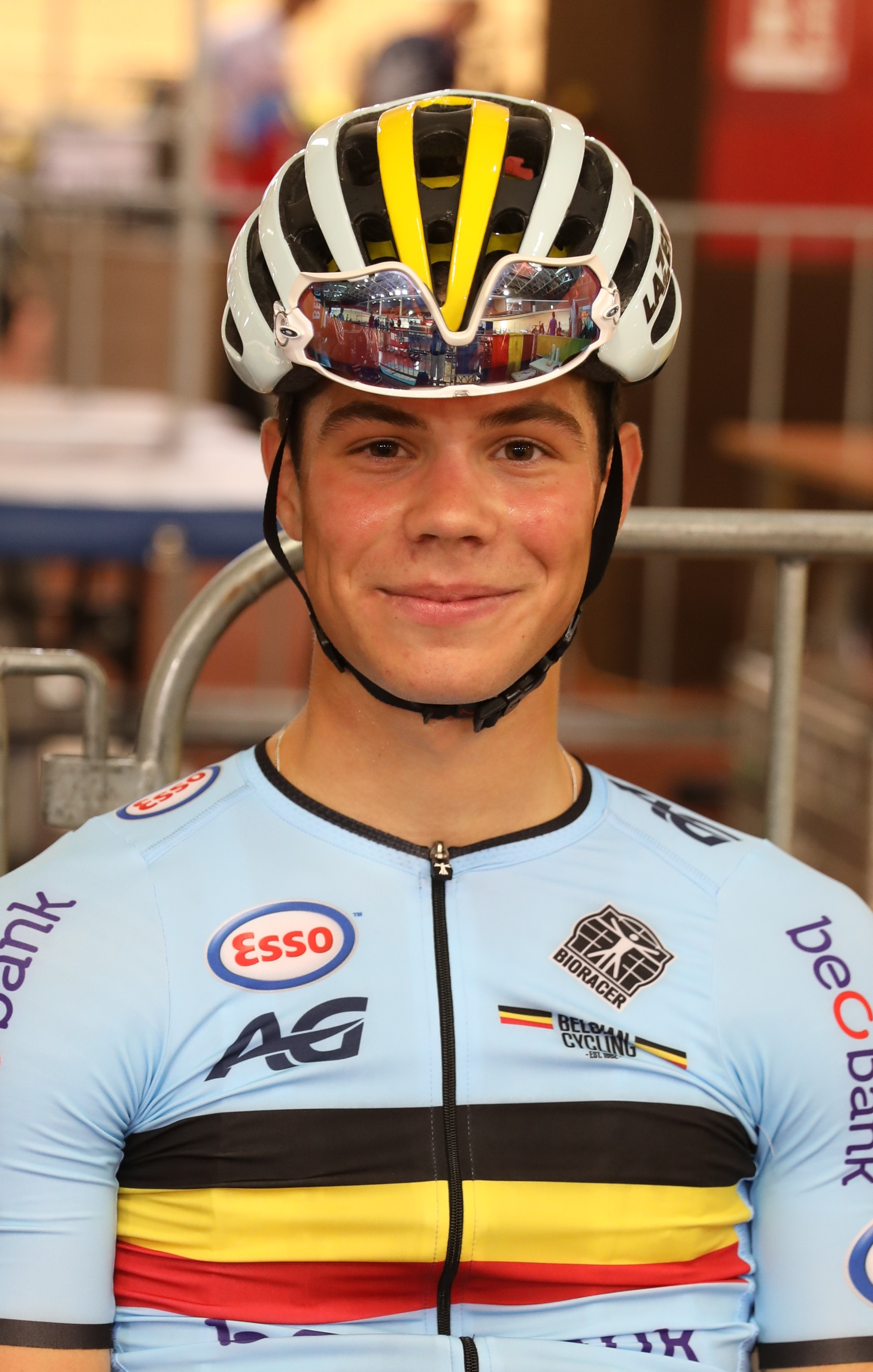
- Fretin at the 2019 UCI Junior Track Cycling World Championships

Personal information
- Born: 19 March 2001 (age 25) Genk, Belgium
- Height: 1.82 m (6 ft 0 in)
- Weight: 70 kg (154 lb)

Cycling career
- Sport: Cycling
- Current team: Cofidis
- Disciplines: Road; Track
- Role: Rider
- Rider type: Sprinter

Amateur teams
- 2018: Van Moer Logistics
- 2019: Zannata-Galloo Menen VVZW
- 2020: Home Solution–Soenens
- 2021: Lotto–Soudal U23

Professional teams
- 2022–2023: Sport Vlaanderen–Baloise
- 2024–: Cofidis

Major wins
- One-day races and Classics Clásica de Almería (2025)

Milan Fretin (born 19 March 2001) is a Belgian racing cyclist, who currently rides for UCI WorldTeam Cofidis.

== Major results ==
=== Road ===
2018
9th Paris–Roubaix Juniors
9th E3 Harelbeke Junioren
2019
2nd Johan Museeuw Classic
3rd Nokere Koerse Juniores
9th Trofee van Vlaanderen
2021
2nd Omloop Het Nieuwsblad Beloften
2nd Mémorial Bjorg Lambrecht
6th Overall Okolo Jižních Čech
2022
3rd Sluitingsprijs Putte-Kapellen
10th Münsterland Giro
2023
1st SD WORX BW Classic
6th Van Merksteijn Fences Classic
9th Ronde van Limburg
10th Dorpenomloop Rucphen
10th Gooikse Pijl
2024 (2 pro wins)
1st Stage 2 Tour Poitou-Charentes en Nouvelle-Aquitaine
3rd Münsterland Giro
3rd Binche–Chimay–Binche
3rd Paris–Chauny
4th Grand Prix de Fourmies
4th Surf Coast Classic
4th Heistse Pijl
5th Circuit de Wallonie
6th Overall Four Days of Dunkirk

1st Stage 1

6th Clásica de Almería
9th Brussels Cycling Classic
2025 (3)
1st Clásica de Almería
1st Ronde van Limburg
1st Stage 4 Volta ao Algarve
4th Scheldeprijs
4th Nokere Koerse
4th Grand Prix de Fourmies
4th Grand Prix Criquielion
5th Grote Prijs Jean-Pierre Monseré
6th Omloop van het Houtland
8th Gooikse Pijl
9th Bredene Koksijde Classic
10th Kuurne–Brussels–Kuurne
2026 (5)
Tour Poitou-Charentes en Nouvelle-Aquitaine

1st Points classification
1st Stages 1 & 4

Tour of Guangxi

1st Stages 3 & 5

1st Stage 3 Vuelta a Andalucía
2nd Clásica de Almería
3rd Grand Prix de Wallonie
6th Hamburg Cyclassics
7th Münsterland Giro

=== Track ===
2018
1st Elimination, UEC European Junior Championships
National Junior Championships

1st Keirin
1st Madison (with Arno Waeyaert)
