= Magnus Kulset =

Norwegian road cyclist (born 2000)

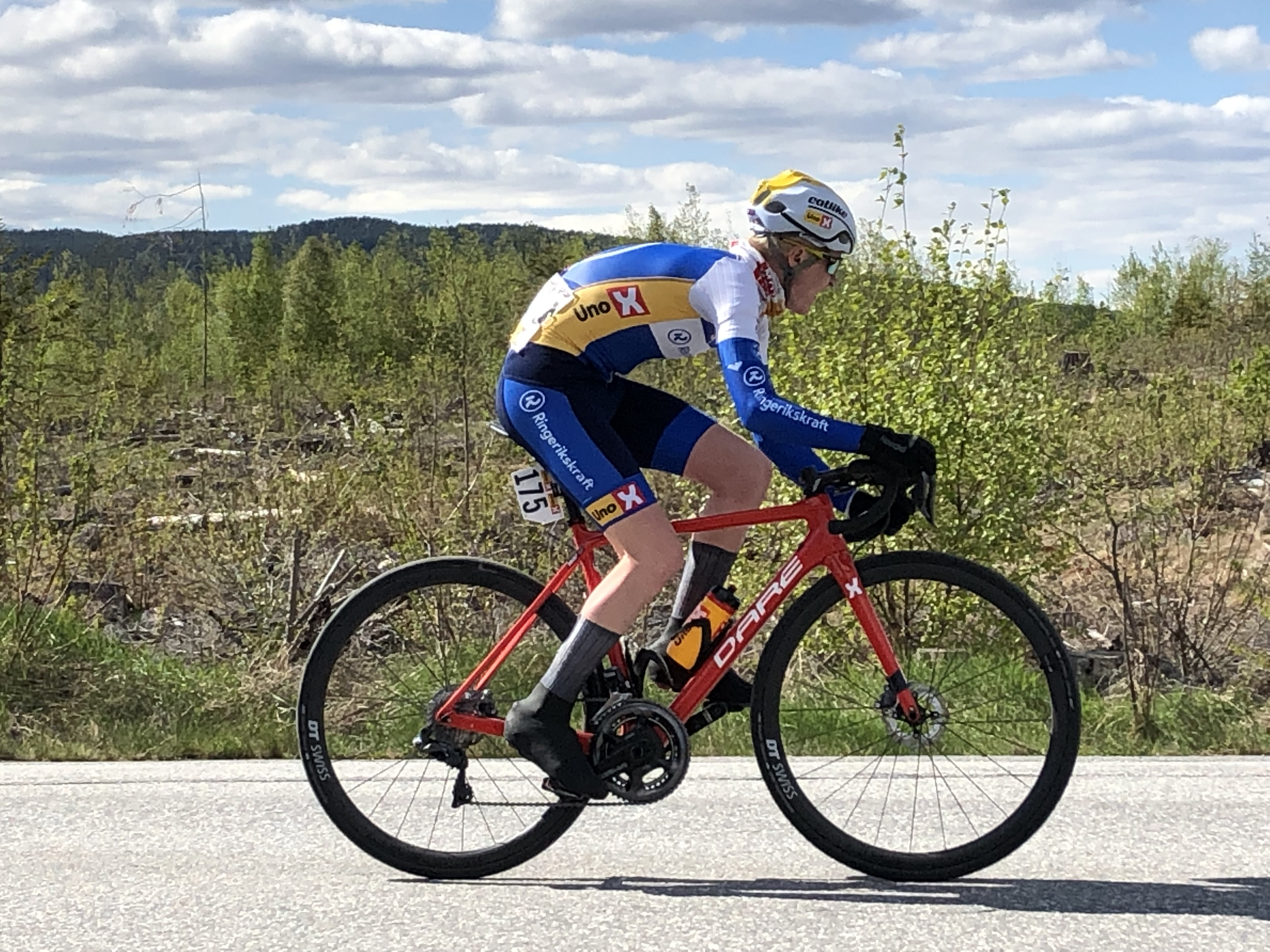
- Kulset in 2019

Personal information
- Full name: Magnus Marthinsen Kulset
- Born: 18 August 2000 (age 26) Oslo, Norway
- Height: 1.74 m (5 ft 9 in)
- Weight: 58 kg (128 lb)

Cycling career
- Sport: Cycling
- Current team: Team Ringerike
- Discipline: Road
- Role: Rider

Amateur teams
- 2015–2020: Ringerike SK
- 2019–2020: Dare Bikes Development Team

Professional teams
- 2021–2022: Uno-X Dare Development Team
- 2023–2025: Uno-X Pro Cycling Team
- 2026–: Team Ringerike

Magnus Marthinsen Kulset (born 18 August 2000) is a Norwegian cyclist, who currently rides for UCI Continental team Team Ringerike.

His brothers Kristian, Sindre and Johannes are also professional cyclists.

== Major results ==
2020
9th Lillehammer GP
2022
8th Lillehammer GP
