= Seget, Croatia =

Municipality in Split-Dalmatia, Croatia

Seget
- Municipality
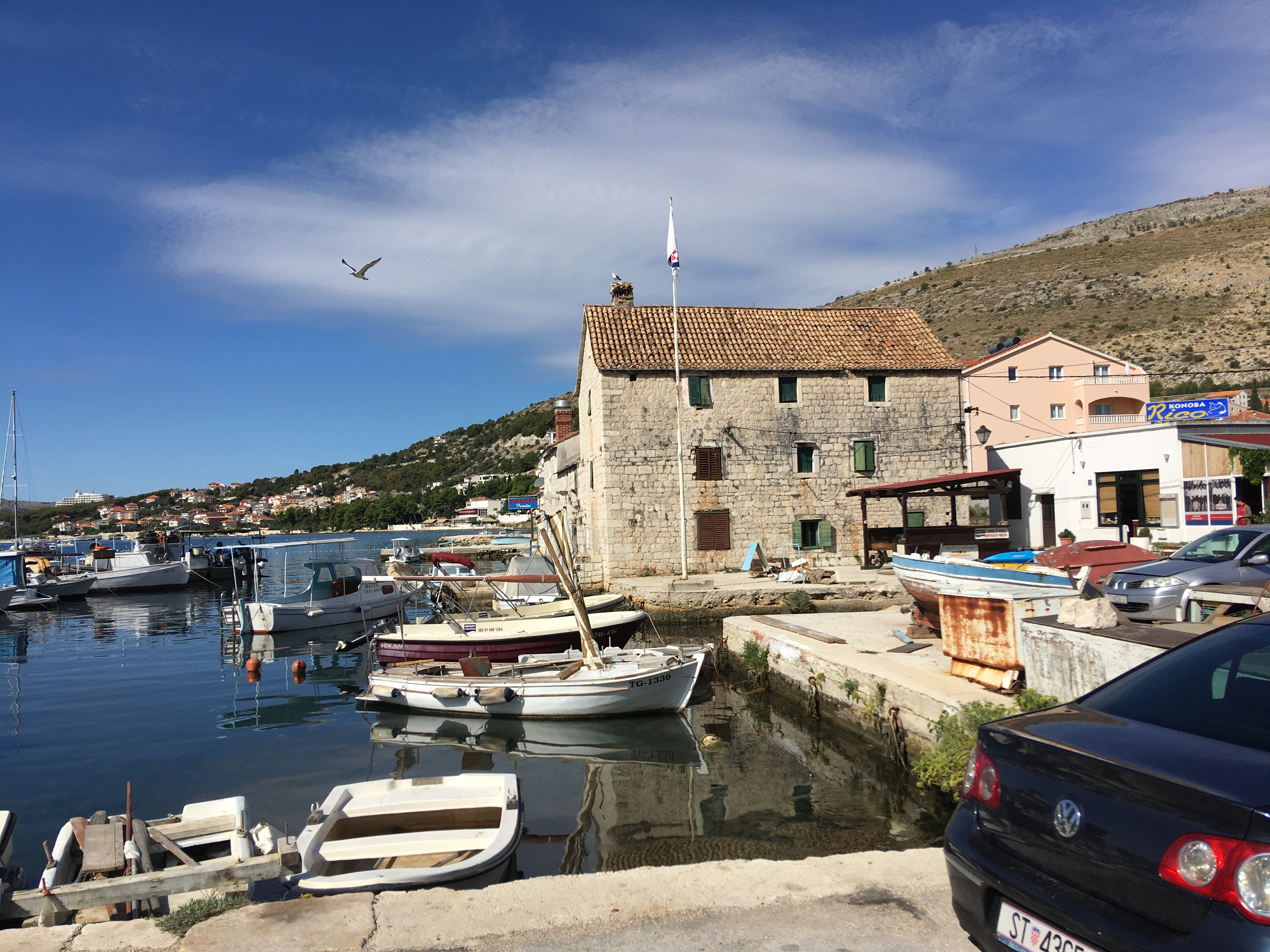

- Location of Seget within Croatia.
- Coordinates: 43°32′00.12″N 16°13′59.88″E
- Country: Croatia
- Region: Dalmatia
- County: Split-Dalmatia County

Area
  - Total: 77.90 km^{2} (30.08 sq mi)

Population (2021)
  - Total: 4,511
- Postal code: 21218

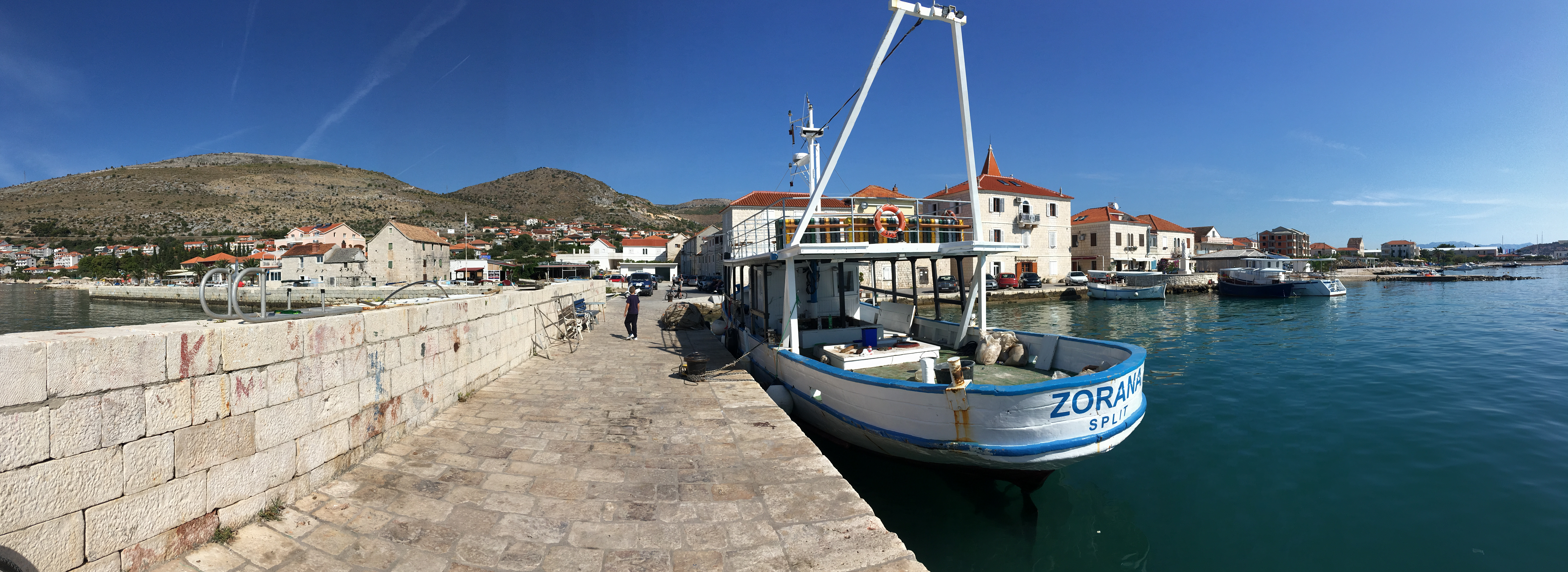
Seget Donji, harbour

Seget is a municipality in Croatia in the Split-Dalmatia County.

== Demographics ==
In the 2021 census, it had a total population of 4511, in the following settlements:

- Bristivica, population 348
- Ljubitovica, population 485
- Prapatnica, population 177
- Seget Donji, population 2,681
- Seget Gornji, population 136
- Seget Vranjica, population 1,027

In 2011, 97.4% of the population were Croats.

Seget: Population trends 1857–2021
v

population	2178	2300	2280	2721	3063	3533	3848	4481	4479	4695	4913	4515	4241	4627	4904	4854	4511
	1857	1869	1880	1890	1900	1910	1921	1931	1948	1953	1961	1971	1981	1991	2001	2011	2021

Sources: Croatian Bureau of Statistics publications
