= Tobias Svarre =

Danish cyclist

Personal information
- Full name: Tobias Nygaard Svarre
- Born: 19 July 2004 (age 22) Faxe, Denmark
- Height: 1.78 m (5 ft 10 in)

Cycling career
- Sport: Cycling
- Current team: Uno-X Mobility
- Discipline: Road
- Role: Rider

Amateur team
- 2021–2022: Team NPV–Carl Ras Roskilde Junior

Professional teams
- 2023–2025: Team ColoQuick
- 2025: Uno-X Mobility (stagiaire)
- 2026–: Uno-X Mobility

Tobias Nygaard Svarre (born 19 July 2004) is a Danish cyclist, who currently rides for UCI WorldTeam Uno-X Mobility.

== Major results ==
2022
1st Team pursuit, National Track Championships
1st Overall Ster van Zuid-Limburg

1st Prologue & Stage 1

1st Trofeo Emilio Paganessi
2nd Gent–Wevelgem Juniors
6th Overall Grand Prix Rüebliland
2023
1st Meldgaardløbet
2024
1st Sydbank Løbet
3rd Sundvolden GP
2025
4th Overall Orlen Nations Grand Prix

1st Stage 3

2026 (2 pro wins)
1st CRO Race

1st Stage 3 CRO Race
