= Johannes Kulset =

Norwegian road cyclist (born 2004)

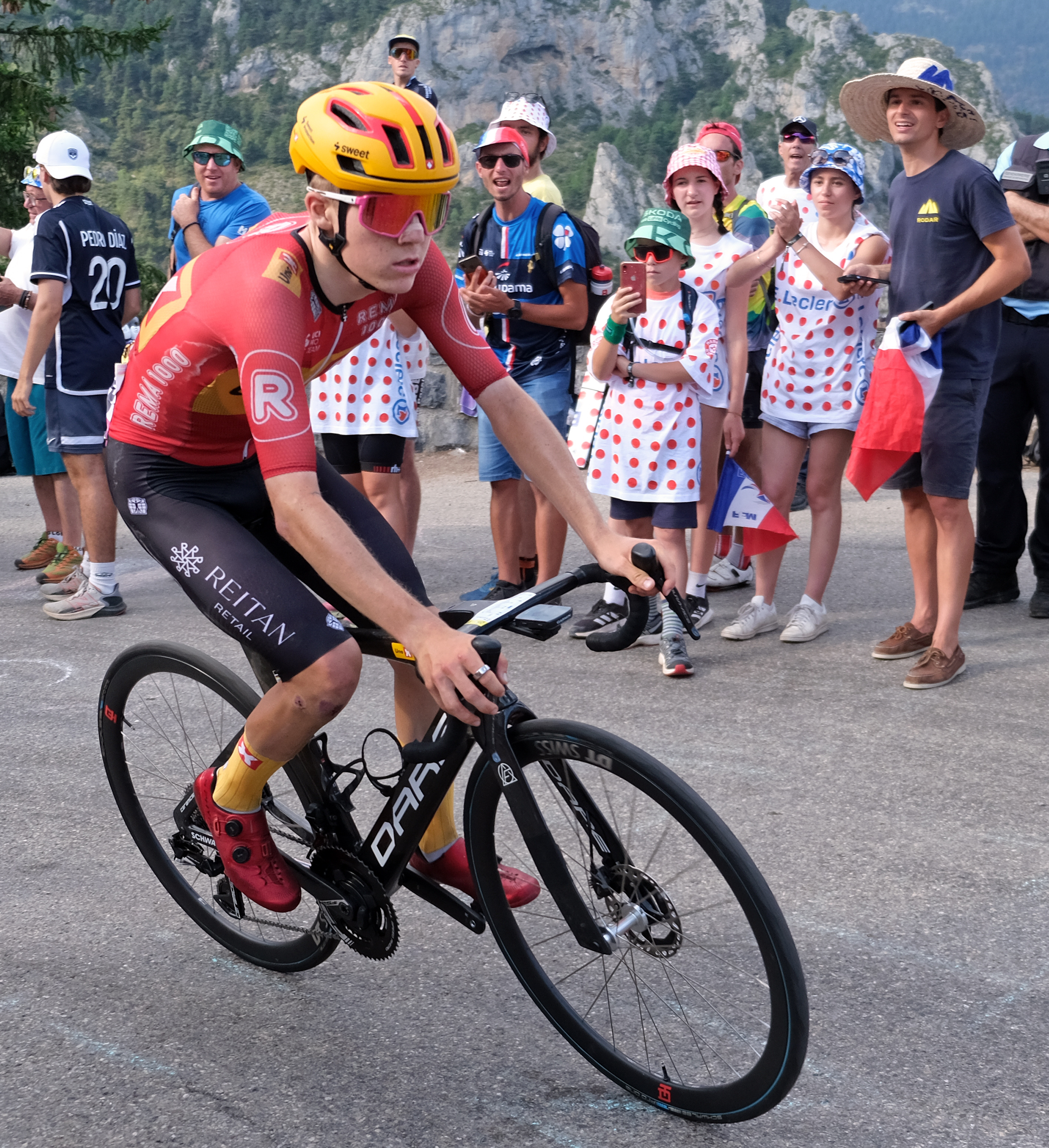
- Kulset at the 2024 Tour de France

Personal information
- Born: 14 April 2004 (age 22) Oslo, Norway
- Height: 1.75 m (5 ft 9 in)
- Weight: 58 kg (128 lb)

Cycling career
- Sport: Cycling
- Current team: Uno-X Mobility
- Discipline: Road
- Role: Rider
- Rider type: Climber

Amateur team
- 2021–2022: Ringerike SK Junior

Professional teams
- 2023: Uno-X Dare Development Team
- 2024–: Uno-X Mobility

Johannes Kulset (born 14 April 2004) is a Norwegian cyclist, who currently rides for UCI ProTeam Uno-X Mobility.

His brothers Kristian, Sindre and Magnus are also professional cyclists.

== Career ==
After riding for Ringerike SK as a junior, Kulset signed a 5-year contract with Uno-X in 2022.

Kulset took part in the 2024 Tour de France, the youngest rider to take part in the race. On Stage 16, he crashed after hitting a spectator's outstretched arm, and later narrowly avoided being involved in a collision with two Uno-X team cars as he chased back to the peloton.

== Major results ==
2021
1st Young rider classification, Giro della Lunigiana
2022
2nd Overall Tour du Pays de Vaud
3rd Overall Trophée Centre Morbihan
2023
2nd Lillehammer GP
3rd Overall Alpes Isère Tour
8th Overall Sibiu Cycling Tour
9th Overall Tour de l'Avenir
2024
8th Overall Tour of Oman
2025
2nd Sundvolden GP
3rd Overall AlUla Tour

1st Young rider classification

4th Ringerike GP
5th Overall Tour of Turkey
5th Tour du Doubs
6th Overall Tour of Slovenia
7th Trofeo Tessile & Moda
8th GP Industria & Artigianato di Larciano
9th Overall Vuelta a Burgos
9th Tre Valli Varesine
9th Coppa Agostoni
10th Overall O Gran Camiño
2026
6th Trofeo Andratx–Pollença
10th Overall Arctic Race of Norway

=== Grand Tour general classification results timeline ===
Grand Tour	2024
Giro d'Italia	—
Tour de France	47
Vuelta a España	—

Legend
—	Did not compete
DNF	Did not finish
