= 2025 UAE Team Emirates–XRG season =

UAE Team Emirates XRG
- 2025 season
- UCI code: UAD
- Status: UCI WorldTeam
- Manager: Mauro Gianetti (SWI)
- Main sponsor(s): Emirates; United Arab Emirates
- Based: United Arab Emirates
- Bicycles: Colnago
- Groupset: Shimano

Season victories
- One-day races: 14
- Stage race overall: 15
- Stage race stages: 37
- National Championships: 6
- Most wins: (Slovenia) Tadej Pogačar (20)

The 2025 season for UAE Team Emirates XRG is the 27th season in the team's existence and the 9th under the current name. The team has been a UCI WorldTeam since 2005, when the tier was first established.

== Team roster ==
All ages are as of 1 January 2025, the first day of the 2025 season.

As of 2 January 2025.

Rider	Date of birth
João Almeida (POR)	5 August 1998 (aged 26)
Igor Arrieta (ESP)	December 8, 2002 (age 23)
Juan Ayuso (ESP)	16 September 2002 (aged 22)
Filippo Baroncini (ITA)	26 August 2000 (aged 24)
Mikkel Bjerg (DEN)	3 November 1998 (aged 26)
Jan Christen (SUI)	26 June 2004 (aged 20)
Alessandro Covi (ITA)	28 September 1998 (aged 26)
Isaac del Toro (MEX)	27 November 2003 (aged 21)
Felix Großschartner (AUT)	23 December 1993 (aged 31)
Rune Herregodts (BEL)	27 July 1998 (aged 26)
Julius Johansen (DEN)	13 September 1999 (aged 25)
Vegard Stake Laengen (NOR)	7 February 1989 (aged 35)
Rafał Majka (POL)	12 September 1989 (aged 35)
Brandon McNulty (USA)	2 April 1998 (aged 26)
Juan Sebastián Molano (COL)	4 November 1994 (aged 30)

Rider	Date of birth
António Morgado (POR)	28 January 2004 (aged 20)
Jhonatan Narváez (ECU)	4 March 1997 (aged 27)
Domen Novak (SLO)	12 July 1995 (aged 29)
Ivo Oliveira (POR)	5 September 1996 (aged 28)
Rui Oliveira (POR)	5 September 1996 (aged 28)
Tadej Pogačar (SLO)	21 September 1998 (aged 26)
Nils Politt (GER)	6 March 1994 (aged 30)
Pavel Sivakov (FRA)	11 July 1997 (aged 27)
Marc Soler (ESP)	22 November 1993 (aged 31)
Pablo Torres (ESP)	10 November 2005 (aged 19)
Florian Vermeersch (BEL)	12 March 1999 (aged 25)
Jay Vine (AUS)	16 November 1995 (aged 29)
Tim Wellens (BEL)	10 May 1991 (aged 33)
Adam Yates (GBR)	7 August 1992 (aged 32)

== Season victories ==
Date	Race	Competition	Rider	Country	Location	Ref.
25 January	Tour Down Under, stage 5	UCI World Tour	Jhonatan Narváez (ECU)	Australia	Willunga Hill	
25 January	Gran Premio Castellón - Ruta de la Cerámica	UCI Europe Tour	António Morgado (POR)	Spain	Onda	
26 January	Tour Down Under, overall	UCI World Tour	Jhonatan Narváez (ECU)	Australia		
29 January	Trofeo Calvià	UCI Europe Tour	Jan Christen (SWI)	Spain	Palma Nova	
12 February	Tour of Oman, overall	UCI ProSeries	Adam Yates (GBR)	Oman		
16 February	Figueira Champions Classic	UCI ProSeries	António Morgado (POR)	Portugal	Figueira da Foz	
19 February	UAE Tour, stage 3	UCI World Tour	Tadej Pogačar (SLO)	United Arab Emirates	Jebel Jais	
20 February	Volta ao Algarve, stage 2	UCI ProSeries	Jan Christen (SWI)	Portugal	Alto da Fóia	
23 February	UAE Tour, stage 7	UCI World Tour	Tadej Pogačar (SLO)	United Arab Emirates	Jebel Hafeet	
23 February	UAE Tour, overall	UCI World Tour	Tadej Pogačar (SLO)	United Arab Emirates		
23 February	Vuelta a Andalucía, overall	UCI ProSeries	Pavel Sivakov (FRA)	Spain		
2 March	La Drôme Classic	UCI ProSeries	Juan Ayuso (ESP)	France	Étoile-sur-Rhône	
5 March	Trofeo Laigueglia	UCI ProSeries	Juan Ayuso (ESP)	Italy	Laigueglia	
8 March	Strade Bianche	UCI World Tour	Tadej Pogačar (SLO)	Italy	Siena	
12 March	Paris–Nice, stage 4	UCI World Tour	João Almeida (POR)	France	La Loge des Gardes	
15 March	Tirreno–Adriatico, stage 6	UCI World Tour	Juan Ayuso (ESP)	Italy	Frontignano	
16 March	Tirreno–Adriatico, overall	UCI World Tour	Juan Ayuso (ESP)	Italy		
19 March	Milano–Torino	UCI ProSeries	Isaac del Toro (MEX)	Italy	Turin	
26 March	Classic Brugge–De Panne	UCI World Tour	Juan Sebastián Molano (COL)	Belgium	De Panne	
26 March	Volta a Catalunya, stage 3	UCI World Tour	Juan Ayuso (ESP)	Spain	La Molina	
27 March	Settimana Internazionale di Coppi e Bartali, stage 3	UCI Europe Tour	Jay Vine (AUS)	Italy	Cesena	
29 March	Settimana Internazionale di Coppi e Bartali, stage 5	UCI Europe Tour	Jay Vine (AUS)	Italy	Forlì	
6 April	Tour of Flanders	UCI World Tour	Tadej Pogačar (SLO)	Belgium	Oudenaarde	
10 April	Tour of the Basque Country, stage 4	UCI World Tour	João Almeida (POR)	Spain	Markina-Xemein	
12 April	Tour of the Basque Country, stage 6	UCI World Tour	João Almeida (POR)	Spain	Eibar	
12 April	Tour of the Basque Country, overall	UCI World Tour	João Almeida (POR)	Spain		
15 April	Giro d'Abruzzo, stage 1	UCI Europe Tour	Alessandro Covi (ITA)	Italy	Crecchio	
16 April	Giro d'Abruzzo, stage 2	UCI Europe Tour	Ivo Oliveira (POR)	Italy	Penne	
18 April	Giro d'Abruzzo, stage 4	UCI Europe Tour	Ivo Oliveira (POR)	Italy	Isola del Gran Sasso	
23 April	La Flèche Wallonne	UCI World Tour	Tadej Pogačar (SLO)	Belgium	Huy	
26 April	Vuelta a Asturias, stage 3	UCI Europe Tour	Alessandro Covi (ITA)	Spain	Vegadeo	
27 April	Vuelta a Asturias, stage 4	UCI Europe Tour	Marc Soler (ESP)	Spain	Oviedo	
27 April	Vuelta a Asturias, overall	UCI Europe Tour	Marc Soler (ESP)	Spain		
27 April	Liège–Bastogne–Liège	UCI World Tour	Tadej Pogačar (SLO)	Belgium	Liège	
2 May	Tour de Romandie, stage 3	UCI World Tour	Jay Vine (AUS)	Switzerland	Cossonay	
4 May	Tour de Romandie, overall	UCI World Tour	João Almeida (POR)	Switzerland		
16 May	Giro d'Italia, stage 7	UCI World Tour	Juan Ayuso (ESP)	Italy	Tagliacozzo	
18 May	Tour de Hongrie, stage 5	UCI ProSeries	Juan Sebastián Molano (COL)	Hungary	Esztergom	
28 May	Giro d'Italia, stage 17	UCI World Tour	Isaac del Toro (MEX)	Italy	Bormio	
8 June	Tour of Slovenia, stage 5	UCI ProSeries	Ivo Oliveira (POR)	Slovenia	Novo Mesto	
8 June	Critérium du Dauphiné, stage 1	UCI World Tour	Tadej Pogačar (SLO)	France	Montluçon	
13 June	Critérium du Dauphiné, stage 6	UCI World Tour	Tadej Pogačar (SLO)	France	Combloux	
14 June	Critérium du Dauphiné, stage 7	UCI World Tour	Tadej Pogačar (SLO)	France	Valmeinier 1800	
15 June	Critérium du Dauphiné, overall	UCI World Tour	Tadej Pogačar (SLO)	France		
18 June	Tour de Suisse, stage 4	UCI World Tour	João Almeida (POR)	Italy	Piuro	
21 June	Tour de Suisse, stage 7	UCI World Tour	João Almeida (POR)	Switzerland	Emmetten	
22 June	Tour of Belgium, overall	UCI ProSeries	Filippo Baroncini (ITA)	Belgium		
22 June	Tour de Suisse, stage 8 (ITT)	UCI World Tour	João Almeida (POR)	Switzerland	Stockhütte	
22 June	Tour de Suisse, overall	UCI World Tour	João Almeida (POR)	Switzerland		
8 July	Tour de France, stage 4	UCI World Tour	Tadej Pogačar (SLO)	France	Rouen	
9 July	Tour of Austria, stage 1	UCI Europe Tour	Felix Großschartner (AUT)	Austria	Steyr	
10 July	Tour of Austria, stage 2	UCI Europe Tour	Isaac del Toro (MEX)	Austria	Alpendorf	
11 July	Tour of Austria, stage 3	UCI Europe Tour	Isaac del Toro (MEX)	Austria	Gaisberg	
11 July	Tour de France, stage 7	UCI World Tour	Tadej Pogačar (SLO)	France	Mûr-de-Bretagne	
12 July	Tour of Austria, stage 4	UCI Europe Tour	Isaac del Toro (MEX)	Austria	Kühtai	
13 July	Tour of Austria, overall	UCI Europe Tour	Isaac del Toro (MEX)	Austria		
17 July	Tour de France, stage 12	UCI World Tour	Tadej Pogačar (SLO)	France	Hautacam	
18 July	Tour de France, stage 13 (ITT)	UCI World Tour	Tadej Pogačar (SLO)	France	Peyragudes	
20 July	Tour de France, stage 15	UCI World Tour	Tim Wellens (BEL)	France	Carcassonne	
21 July	Clásica Terres de l'Ebre	UCI Europe Tour	Isaac del Toro (MEX)	Spain	Tortosa	
25 July	Prueba Villafranca de Ordizia	UCI Europe Tour	Igor Arrieta (ESP)	Spain	Ordizia	
27 July	Tour de France, overall	UCI World Tour	Tadej Pogačar (SLO)	France		
3 August	Circuito de Getxo	UCI Europe Tour	Isaac del Toro (MEX)	Spain	Getxo	
9 August	2025 Vuelta a Burgos, overall	UCI ProSeries	Isaac del Toro (MEX)	Spain		
10 August	Tour de Pologne, stage 7 (ITT)	UCI World Tour	Brandon McNulty (USA)	Poland	Wieliczka	
10 August	Tour de Pologne, overall	UCI World Tour	Brandon McNulty (USA)	Poland		
22 August	Deutschland Tour, stage 2	UCI ProSeries	Jhonatan Narváez (ECU)	Germany	Arnsberg	
27 August	Vuelta a España, stage 5 (TTT)	UCI World Tour	(Note: The riders in the squad were João Almeida, Juan Ayuso, Mikkel Bjerg, Felix Großschartner, Domen Novak, Ivo Oliveira, Marc Soler, and Jay Vine.)	Spain	Figueres	
28 August	Vuelta a España, stage 6	UCI World Tour	Jay Vine (AUS)	Spain	Pal	
29 August	Vuelta a España, stage 7	UCI World Tour	Juan Ayuso (ESP)	Spain	Cerler	
2 September	Vuelta a España, stage 10	UCI World Tour	Jay Vine (AUS)	Spain	Arguedas	
4 September	Vuelta a España, stage 12	UCI World Tour	Juan Ayuso (ESP)	Spain	Los Corrales de Buelna	
5 September	Vuelta a España, stage 13	UCI World Tour	João Almeida (POR)	Spain	L'Angliru	
6 September	Vuelta a España, stage 14	UCI World Tour	Marc Soler (ESP)	Spain	Alto de La Farrapona	
7 September	GP Industria & Artigianato di Larciano	UCI ProSeries	Isaac del Toro (MEX)	Italy	Larciano	
10 September	Giro della Toscana – Memorial Alfredo Martini	UCI Europe Tour	Isaac del Toro (MEX)	Italy	Tuscany	
11 September	Coppa Sabatini	UCI ProSeries	Isaac del Toro (MEX)	Italy	Peccioli	
14 September	Trofeo Matteotti	UCI Europe Tour	Isaac del Toro (MEX)	Italy	Pescara	
14 September	Grand Prix Cycliste de Montréal	UCI World Tour	Brandon McNulty (USA)	Canada	Montréal	
21 September	Tour de Luxembourg, overall	UCI ProSeries	Brandon McNulty (USA)	Luxembourg		
3 October	CRO Race, stage 4	UCI Europe Tour	Brandon McNulty (USA)	Croatia	Labin	
4 October	Giro dell'Emilia	UCI ProSeries	Isaac del Toro (MEX)	Italy	San Luca	
5 October	CRO Race, overall	UCI Europe Tour	Brandon McNulty (USA)	Croatia		
5 October	Coppa Agostoni	UCI Europe Tour	Adam Yates (GBR)	Italy	Lissone	
7 October	Tre Valli Varesine	UCI ProSeries	Tadej Pogačar (SVN)	Italy	Varese	
9 October	Gran Piemonte	UCI ProSeries	Isaac del Toro (MEX)	Italy	Acqui Terme	
11 October	Il Lombardia	UCI World Tour	Tadej Pogačar (SVN)	Italy	Bergamo	
12 October	Trofeo Tessile & Moda	UCI Europe Tour	Adam Yates (GBR)	Italy	Oropa	
15 October	Giro del Veneto	UCI ProSeries	Isaac del Toro (MEX)	Italy	Verona	

== National, Continental, and World Champions ==
Date	Discipline	Jersey	Rider	Country	Location	Ref.
2 February	Ecuadorian National Road Race Championships		Jhonatan Narváez (ECU)	Ecuador	Cotacachi	
27 June	Austrian National Time Trial Championships		Felix Großschartner (AUT)	Austria	Frauenkirchen	
27 June	Portuguese National Time Trial Championships		António Morgado (POR)	Portugal	Alvaiázere	
29 June	Polish National Road Race Championships		Rafał Majka (POL)	Poland	Dobczyce	
29 June	Belgian National Road Race Championships		Tim Wellens (BEL)	Belgium	Binche	
29 June	Portuguese National Road Race Championships		Ivo Oliveira (POR)	Portugal	Ourém	
