= Tobias Halland Johannessen =

Norwegian cyclist (born 1999)

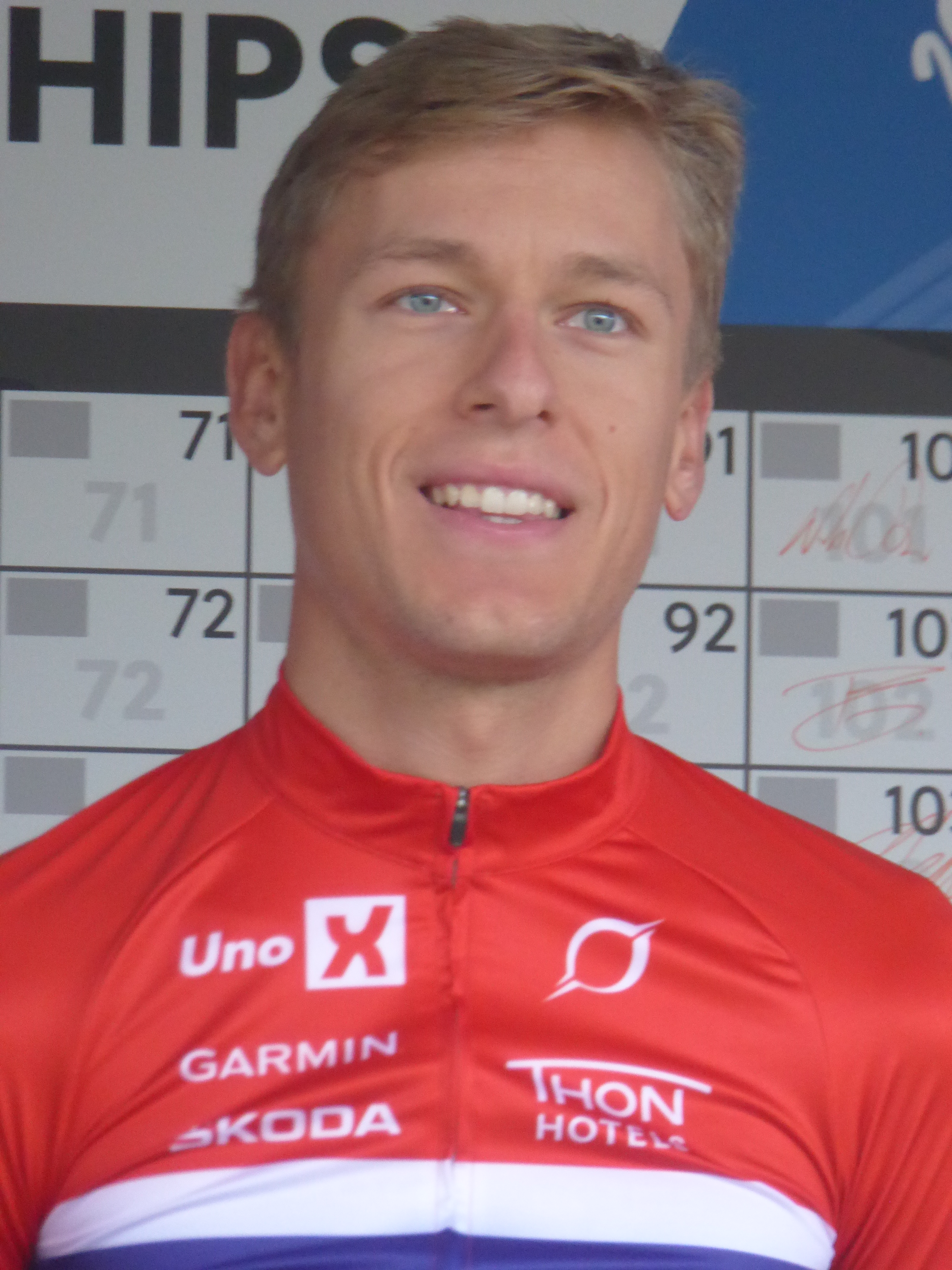
- Halland Johannessen in 2023

Personal information
- Born: 23 August 1999 (age 27) Drøbak, Norway
- Height: 1.76 m (5 ft 9 in)

Cycling career
- Sport: Cycling
- Current team: Uno-X Mobility
- Disciplines: Road; Cyclo-cross; Mountain biking
- Role: Rider
- Rider type: Climber

Amateur team
- 2019–2020: Dare Bikes Development

Professional teams
- 2021: Uno-X Dare Development Team
- 2022–: Uno-X Pro Cycling Team

Major wins
- Grand Tours Vuelta a España 1 individual stage (2026)

Tobias Halland Johannessen (born 23 August 1999) is a Norwegian road cyclist, who currently rides for UCI WorldTeam Uno-X Mobility. Along with his twin brother Anders, Tobias raced in mountain biking, cyclo-cross and road cycling, before deciding to focus primarily on road racing. Knee injuries had kept him from competing in much of the truncated 2020 season. In July 2021 he named to the Norwegian team to compete in the road race event at the 2020 Summer Olympics.

== Career ==
Johannessen began cycling alongside his brother Anders as a means of getting to school. He initially focussed on cyclo-cross and mountain biking before switching his focus to road racing, signing with the Uno-X development team for the 2021 season. In June 2021, Johannessen finished second in the General Classification of the Giro Ciclistico d'Italia, as well as finishing second on two individual stages. In August 2021, Johannessen won the Tour de l'Avenir after finishing first on consecutive summit finishes on Stages 7 and 8, winning the race by seven seconds over Carlos Rodríguez.

Johannessen raced the 2022 Tour of Norway, in which he took the leader's jersey after the second stage and eventually finished in fourth position, winning the Points classification. He also raced the 2022 Critérium du Dauphiné, in which he won the Young Rider Classification after finishing 10th overall, over a minute ahead of nearest challenger Brandon McNulty.

He participated in the 2023 Tour de France, ending third on stage six, and top 10 on three additional stages.

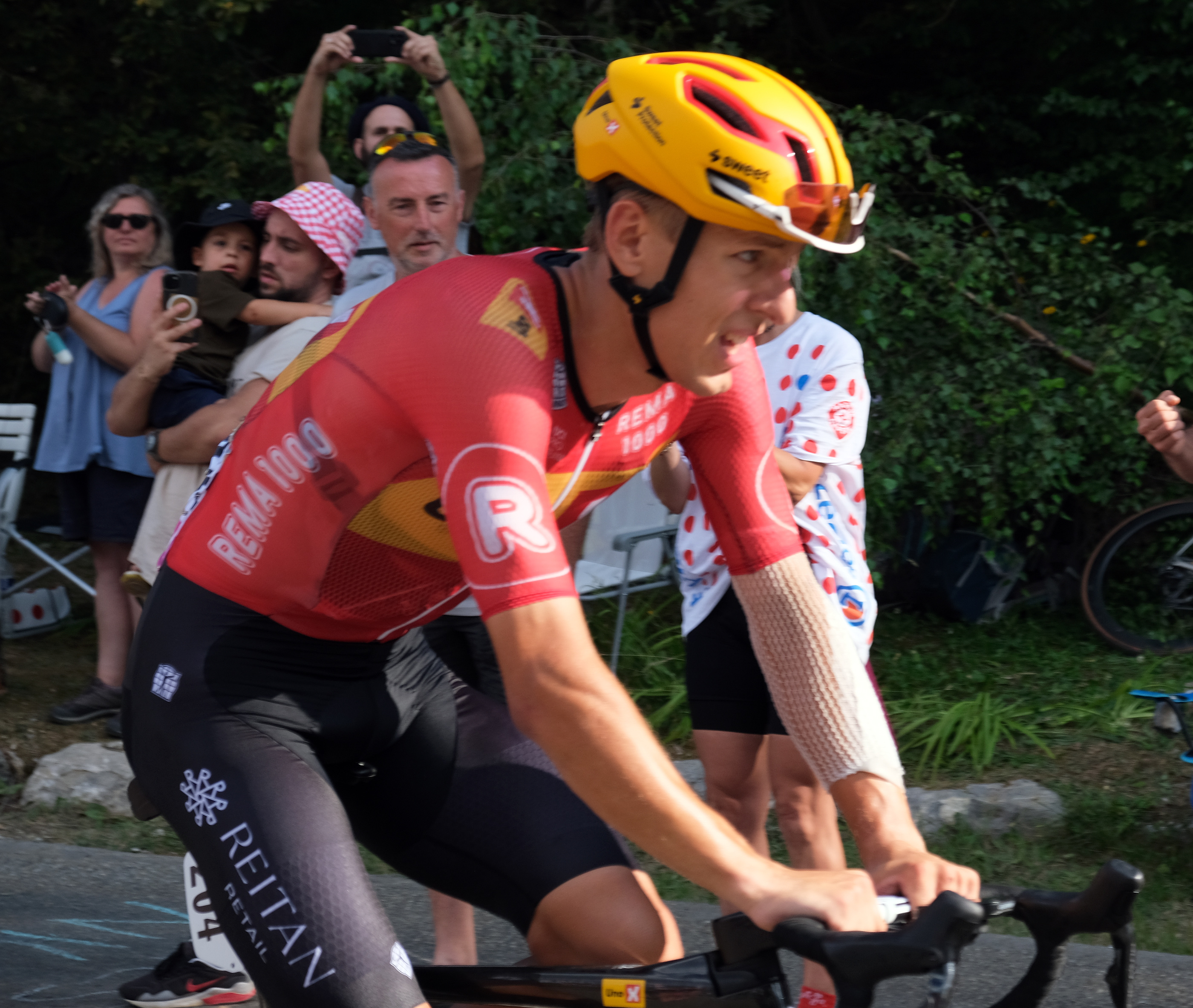
Johannessen at the 2024 Tour de France

In one of his first races of 2024, Johannessen was close to winning the Classic Var, but mistook a metal gantry close the finish for the actual finish. This led to Lenny Martinez overtaking him a few metres before the finish line, thus snatching the victory. In the run-up to Tour des Alpes-Maritimes, Johannessen was regarded by some as a contender to winning the General Classification. He finished 4th on the first stage, but crashed on the second stage and fractured his collarbone. Johannessen returned to racing in the Volta a Catalunya, two months later.

He rode in the 2025 Tour de France, finishing in sixth place overall. On 13 September 2026, he won the 21st stage of the 2026 Vuelta a España for his first Grand Tour stage win.

== Major results ==
=== Cyclo-cross ===
2016–2017
2nd National Junior Championships
2017–2018
1st National Championships
2018–2019
1st National Championships
1st Stockholm
2019–2020
2nd National Championships
2021–2022
1st National Championships

=== Mountain bike ===
2016
3rd Cross-country, UCI World Junior Championships

=== Road ===
2021 (2 pro wins)
1st Overall Tour de l'Avenir

1st Stages 7 & 8

2nd Overall Sazka Tour

1st Stages 3 & 4

2nd Overall Giro Ciclistico d'Italia
3rd Liège–Bastogne–Liège Espoirs
2022 (1)
3rd Overall Étoile de Bessèges

1st Young rider classification
1st Stage 4

4th Overall Tour of Norway

1st Points classification

4th Mont Ventoux Dénivelé Challenge
7th Overall Volta a Catalunya
10th Overall Critérium du Dauphiné

1st Young rider classification

2023 (1)
1st Stage 5 Tour de Luxembourg
2nd Overall Tour of Britain
2nd Giro del Veneto
3rd Paris–Tours
4th Overall Arctic Race of Norway
4th Circuit Franco-Belge
9th Overall Tour of Norway
2024
2nd Classic Var
3rd Overall Deutschland Tour

1st Young rider classification

4th Trofeo Pollença–Port d'Andratx
6th La Flèche Wallonne
6th Gran Piemonte
8th Trofeo Serra de Tramuntana
10th Overall Tour of Slovenia
10th Giro del Veneto
Combativity award Stage 18 Tour de France
2025
3rd Road race, National Championships
3rd Milano–Torino
5th Overall Critérium du Dauphiné
6th Overall Tour de France
7th Tre Valli Varesine
2026 (1)
Vuelta a España

1st Stage 21
Combativity award Stage 20

2nd Milano–Torino
3rd Overall Tour of the Basque Country
4th Overall Tirreno–Adriatico
5th Overall Tour Auvergne-Rhône-Alpes
9th Overall UAE Tour
9th Liège–Bastogne–Liège

==== General classification results timeline ====
Grand Tour general classification results
| Grand Tour | 2022 | 2023 | 2024 | 2025 | 2026 |
| Giro d'Italia | — | — | — | — | — |
| Tour de France | — | 30 | 35 | 6 | 12 |
| Vuelta a España | — | — | — | — | 26 |
Major stage race general classification results
| Race | 2022 | 2023 | 2024 | 2025 | 2026 |
| Paris–Nice | — | — | — | — | — |
| Tirreno–Adriatico | — | — | — | 11 | 4 |
| Volta a Catalunya | 7 | 86 | 89 | — | — |
| Tour of the Basque Country | — | — | — | — | 3 |
| Tour de Romandie | — | — | — | — | — |
| Critérium du Dauphiné | 10 | 15 | — | 5 | 5 |
| Tour de Suisse | — | — | — | — | — |

==== Classics results timeline ====
| Monument | 2022 | 2023 | 2024 | 2025 | 2026 |
|---|---|---|---|---|---|
| Milan–San Remo | — | — | — | 39 | — |
| Tour of Flanders | DNF | — | — | — | — |
| Paris–Roubaix | — | — | — | — | — |
| Liège–Bastogne–Liège | DNF | 24 | 25 | — | 9 |
| Giro di Lombardia | — | — | 97 | — | |
| Classic | 2022 | 2023 | 2024 | 2025 | 2026 |
| Strade Bianche | — | — | — | 23 | 23 |
| Milano–Torino | — | — | — | 3 | 2 |
| La Flèche Wallonne | 20 | 15 | 6 | — | 44 |
| Gran Piemonte | — | — | 6 | DNF | |
| Tre Valli Varesine | — | — | — | 7 | |
| Paris–Tours | — | 3 | 24 | — | |

Legend
| — | Did not compete |
| DNF | Did not finish |
