= Vittorio Veneto (disambiguation) =

Vittorio Veneto may refer to:

- Vittorio Veneto, Italian city and comune

== Military ==
- Italian battleship Vittorio Veneto
- Italian cruiser Vittorio Veneto (550)
- Battle of Vittorio Veneto, 1918

== See also ==
- Vittorio
- Veneto (disambiguation)
