= 2024 Tour Down Under =

Cycling race

2024 Men's Tour Down Under
2024 UCI World Tour, race 1 of 35

Race details
- Dates: 16–21 January 2024
- Stages: 6
- Distance: 824.6 km (512.4 mi)
- Winning time: 19h 13' 34"

Results
Jersey awarded to the overall winner	Winner	Stephen Williams (GBR)	(Israel–Premier Tech)
	Second	Jhonatan Narváez (ECU)	(INEOS Grenadiers)
	Third	Isaac del Toro (MEX)	(UAE Team Emirates)
Jersey awarded to the mountains classification winner	Mountains	Luke Burns (AUS)	(Australia)
Jersey awarded to the young rider classification winner	Young rider	Isaac del Toro (MEX)	(UAE Team Emirates)
Jersey awarded to the sprints classification winner	Sprints	Sam Welsford (AUS)	(Bora–Hansgrohe)
	Team	Decathlon–AG2R La Mondiale	

The 2024 Men's Tour Down Under was a road cycling stage race that was held between 16 and 21 January. It took place in and around Adelaide, and South Australia. It was the 24th edition of the Tour Down Under and the first race of the 2024 UCI World Tour.

The race was won by British rider Stephen Williams of Israel–Premier Tech.

== Teams ==
All eighteen UCI WorldTeams, one UCI ProTeam, and one national team participated in the race.

UCI WorldTeams

- Alpecin–Deceuninck
- Arkéa–B&B Hotels
- Astana Qazaqstan Team
- Bora–Hansgrohe
- Cofidis
- Decathlon–AG2R La Mondiale
- EF Education–EasyPost
- Groupama–FDJ
- INEOS Grenadiers
- Intermarché–Wanty
- Lidl–Trek
- Movistar Team
- Soudal–Quick-Step
- Team Bahrain Victorious
- Team dsm–firmenich PostNL
- Team Jayco–AlUla
- UAE Team Emirates
- Visma–Lease a Bike

UCI ProTeams

- Israel–Premier Tech

National Teams

- Australia

== Route ==
Stage characteristics and winners
Stage	Date	Route	Distance	Elevation gain	Type	Winner
1	16 January	Tanunda to Tanunda	144 km (89 mi)	1,837 m (6,027 ft)	Hilly stage	Sam Welsford (AUS)
2	17 January	Norwood to Lobethal	141.6 km (88.0 mi)	2,948 m (9,672 ft)	Hilly stage	Isaac del Toro (MEX)
3	18 January	Tea Tree Gully to Campbelltown	145.3 km (90.3 mi)	2,211 m (7,254 ft)	Flat stage	Sam Welsford (AUS)
4	19 January	Murray Bridge to Port Elliot	136.2 km (84.6 mi)	1,055 m (3,461 ft)	Hilly stage	Sam Welsford (AUS)
5	20 January	Christies Beach to Willunga Hill	129.3 km (80.3 mi)	1,791 m (5,876 ft)	Hilly stage	Oscar Onley (GBR)
6	21 January	Unley to Mount Lofty	128.2 km (79.7 mi)	2,821 m (9,255 ft)	Hilly stage	Stephen Williams (GBR)
Total			824.6 km (512.4 mi)	12,663 m (41,545 ft)		

== Stages ==
=== Stage 1 ===
16 January 2024 — Tanunda to Tanunda, 144 km (89 mi)

Stage 1 Result
Rank	Rider	Team	Time
1	Sam Welsford (AUS)	Bora–Hansgrohe	3h 25' 56"
2	Phil Bauhaus (GER)	Team Bahrain Victorious	+ 0"
3	Biniam Girmay (ERI)	Intermarché–Wanty	+ 0"
4	Caleb Ewan (AUS)	Team Jayco–AlUla	+ 0"
5	Jhonatan Narváez (ECU)	INEOS Grenadiers	+ 0"
6	Max Kanter (GER)	Astana Qazaqstan Team	+ 0"
7	Danny van Poppel (NED)	Bora–Hansgrohe	+ 0"
8	Corbin Strong (NZL)	Israel–Premier Tech	+ 0"
9	Madis Mihkels (EST)	Intermarché–Wanty	+ 0"
10	Mathias Vacek (CZE)	Lidl–Trek	+ 0"

General classification after Stage 1
Rank	Rider	Team	Time
1	Sam Welsford (AUS)	Bora–Hansgrohe	3h 25' 46"
2	Phil Bauhaus (GER)	Team Bahrain Victorious	+ 4"
3	Biniam Girmay (ERI)	Intermarché–Wanty	+ 6"
4	Corbin Strong (NZL)	Israel–Premier Tech	+ 7"
5	Georg Zimmermann (GER)	Intermarché–Wanty	+ 7"
6	Finn Fisher-Black (NZL)	UAE Team Emirates	+ 7"
7	Louis Barré (FRA)	Arkéa–B&B Hotels	+ 8"
8	Jhonatan Narváez (ECU)	INEOS Grenadiers	+ 9"
9	Caleb Ewan (AUS)	Team Jayco–AlUla	+ 10"
10	Max Kanter (GER)	Astana Qazaqstan Team	+ 10"

=== Stage 2 ===
17 January 2024 — Norwood to Lobethal, 141.6 km (88 mi)

Stage 2 Result
Rank	Rider	Team	Time
1	Isaac del Toro (MEX)	UAE Team Emirates	3h 29' 37"
2	Corbin Strong (NZL)	Israel–Premier Tech	+ 0"
3	Stephen Williams (GBR)	Israel–Premier Tech	+ 0"
4	Biniam Girmay (ERI)	Intermarché–Wanty	+ 0"
5	Caleb Ewan (AUS)	Team Jayco–AlUla	+ 0"
6	Lars Boven (NED)	Alpecin–Deceuninck	+ 0"
7	Ruben Guerreiro (POR)	Movistar Team	+ 0"
8	Danny van Poppel (NED)	Bora–Hansgrohe	+ 0"
9	Max Kanter (GER)	Astana Qazaqstan Team	+ 0"
10	Laurence Pithie (NZL)	Groupama–FDJ	+ 0"

General classification after Stage 2
Rank	Rider	Team	Time
1	Isaac del Toro (MEX)	UAE Team Emirates	6h 55' 22"
2	Corbin Strong (NZL)	Israel–Premier Tech	+ 2"
3	Biniam Girmay (ERI)	Intermarché–Wanty	+ 7"
4	Stephen Williams (GBR)	Israel–Premier Tech	+ 7"
5	Georg Zimmermann (GER)	Intermarché–Wanty	+ 8"
6	Finn Fisher-Black (NZL)	UAE Team Emirates	+ 8"
7	Louis Barré (FRA)	Arkéa–B&B Hotels	+ 9"
8	Caleb Ewan (AUS)	Team Jayco–AlUla	+ 10"
9	Jhonatan Narváez (ECU)	INEOS Grenadiers	+ 10"
10	Danny van Poppel (NED)	Bora–Hansgrohe	+ 11"

=== Stage 3 ===
18 January 2024 — Tea Tree Gully to Campbelltown, 145.3 km (90.3 mi)

Stage 3 Result
Rank	Rider	Team	Time
1	Sam Welsford (AUS)	Bora–Hansgrohe	3h 20' 42"
2	Elia Viviani (ITA)	INEOS Grenadiers	+ 0"
3	Daniel McLay (GBR)	Arkéa–B&B Hotels	+ 0"
4	Laurence Pithie (NZL)	Groupama–FDJ	+ 0"
5	Max Kanter (GER)	Astana Qazaqstan Team	+ 0"
6	Caleb Ewan (AUS)	Team Jayco–AlUla	+ 0"
7	Álvaro Hodeg (COL)	UAE Team Emirates	+ 0"
8	Biniam Girmay (ERI)	Intermarché–Wanty	+ 0"
9	Jhonatan Narváez (ECU)	INEOS Grenadiers	+ 0"
10	Emīls Liepiņš (LAT)	Team dsm–firmenich PostNL	+ 0"

General classification after Stage 3
Rank	Rider	Team	Time
1	Isaac del Toro (MEX)	UAE Team Emirates	10h 16' 04"
2	Corbin Strong (NZL)	Israel–Premier Tech	+ 2"
3	Axel Mariault (FRA)	Cofidis	+ 5"
4	Biniam Girmay (ERI)	Intermarché–Wanty	+ 7"
5	Stephen Williams (GBR)	Israel–Premier Tech	+ 7"
6	Stefan De Bod (RSA)	EF Education–EasyPost	+ 7"
7	Georg Zimmermann (GER)	Intermarché–Wanty	+ 8"
8	Finn Fisher-Black (NZL)	UAE Team Emirates	+ 8"
9	Louis Barré (FRA)	Arkéa–B&B Hotels	+ 9"
10	Caleb Ewan (AUS)	Team Jayco–AlUla	+ 10"

=== Stage 4 ===
19 January 2024 — Murray Bridge to Port Elliot, 136.2 km (84.6 mi)

Stage 4 Result
Rank	Rider	Team	Time
1	Sam Welsford (AUS)	Bora–Hansgrohe	2h 59' 50"
2	Biniam Girmay (ERI)	Intermarché–Wanty	+ 0"
3	Lars Boven (NED)	Alpecin–Deceuninck	+ 0"
4	Milan Fretin (BEL)	Cofidis	+ 0"
5	Laurence Pithie (NZL)	Groupama–FDJ	+ 0"
6	Gonzalo Serrano (ESP)	Movistar Team	+ 0"
7	Max Kanter (GER)	Astana Qazaqstan Team	+ 0"
8	Antoine Huby (FRA)	Soudal–Quick-Step	+ 0"
9	Phil Bauhaus (GER)	Team Bahrain Victorious	+ 0"
10	Simon Clarke (AUS)	Israel–Premier Tech	+ 0"

General classification after Stage 4
Rank	Rider	Team	Time
1	Isaac del Toro (MEX)	UAE Team Emirates	13h 15' 54"
2	Biniam Girmay (ERI)	Intermarché–Wanty	+ 1"
3	Corbin Strong (NZL)	Israel–Premier Tech	+ 2"
4	Axel Mariault (FRA)	Cofidis	+ 5"
5	Stephen Williams (GBR)	Israel–Premier Tech	+ 7"
6	Lars Boven (NED)	Alpecin–Deceuninck	+ 7"
7	Stefan De Bod (RSA)	EF Education–EasyPost	+ 7"
8	Georg Zimmermann (GER)	Intermarché–Wanty	+ 8"
9	Finn Fisher-Black (NZL)	UAE Team Emirates	+ 8"
10	Louis Barré (FRA)	Arkéa–B&B Hotels	+ 9"

=== Stage 5 ===
20 January 2024 — Christies Beach to Willunga Hill, 129.3 km (80.3 mi)

Stage 5 Result
Rank	Rider	Team	Time
1	Oscar Onley (GBR)	Team dsm–firmenich PostNL	2h 52' 23"
2	Stephen Williams (GBR)	Israel–Premier Tech	+ 0"
3	Jhonatan Narváez (ECU)	INEOS Grenadiers	+ 0"
4	Julian Alaphilippe (FRA)	Soudal–Quick-Step	+ 3"
5	Bart Lemmen (NED)	Visma–Lease a Bike	+ 3"
6	Simon Yates (GBR)	Team Jayco–AlUla	+ 3"
7	Valentin Paret-Peintre (FRA)	Decathlon–AG2R La Mondiale	+ 6"
8	Isaac del Toro (MEX)	UAE Team Emirates	+ 6"
9	Damien Howson (AUS)	Australia	+ 12"
10	Finn Fisher-Black (NZL)	UAE Team Emirates	+ 20"

General classification after Stage 5
Rank	Rider	Team	Time
1	Stephen Williams (GBR)	Israel–Premier Tech	16h 08' 18"
2	Oscar Onley (GBR)	Team dsm–firmenich PostNL	+ 0"
3	Jhonatan Narváez (ECU)	INEOS Grenadiers	+ 5"
4	Isaac del Toro (MEX)	UAE Team Emirates	+ 5"
5	Julian Alaphilippe (FRA)	Soudal–Quick-Step	+ 13"
6	Bart Lemmen (NED)	Visma–Lease a Bike	+ 13"
7	Simon Yates (GBR)	Team Jayco–AlUla	+ 13"
8	Valentin Paret-Peintre (FRA)	Decathlon–AG2R La Mondiale	+ 16"
9	Damien Howson (AUS)	Australia	+ 22"
10	Axel Mariault (FRA)	Cofidis	+ 24"

=== Stage 6 ===
21 January 2024 — Unley to Mount Lofty, 128.2 km (79.7 mi)

Stage 6 Result
Rank	Rider	Team	Time
1	Stephen Williams (GBR)	Israel–Premier Tech	3h 05' 26"
2	Jhonatan Narváez (ECU)	INEOS Grenadiers	+ 0"
3	Isaac del Toro (MEX)	UAE Team Emirates	+ 0"
4	Bart Lemmen (NED)	Visma–Lease a Bike	+ 0"
5	Laurence Pithie (NZL)	Groupama–FDJ	+ 3"
6	Julian Alaphilippe (FRA)	Soudal–Quick-Step	+ 10"
7	Damien Howson (AUS)	Australia	+ 10"
8	Christian Scaroni (ITA)	Astana Qazaqstan Team	+ 10"
9	Bauke Mollema (NED)	Lidl–Trek	+ 10"
10	Lars Boven (NED)	Alpecin–Deceuninck	+ 10"

General classification after Stage 6
Rank	Rider	Team	Time
1	Stephen Williams (GBR)	Israel–Premier Tech	19h 13' 34"
2	Jhonatan Narváez (ECU)	INEOS Grenadiers	+ 9"
3	Isaac del Toro (MEX)	UAE Team Emirates	+ 11"
4	Oscar Onley (GBR)	Team dsm–firmenich PostNL	+ 20"
5	Bart Lemmen (NED)	Visma–Lease a Bike	+ 23"
6	Julian Alaphilippe (FRA)	Soudal–Quick-Step	+ 33"
7	Simon Yates (GBR)	Team Jayco–AlUla	+ 33"
8	Valentin Paret-Peintre (FRA)	Decathlon–AG2R La Mondiale	+ 36"
9	Damien Howson (AUS)	Australia	+ 42"
10	Jack Haig (AUS)	Team Bahrain Victorious	+ 50"

== Classification leadership table ==
Classification leadership by stage
Stage	Winner	General classification	Sprints classification	Mountains classification	Young rider classification	Most competitive rider(s)	Team classification
1	Sam Welsford	Sam Welsford	Sam Welsford	Louis Barré	Madis Mihkels	Louis Barré	Intermarché–Wanty
2	Isaac del Toro	Isaac del Toro	Biniam Girmay	Luke Burns	Isaac del Toro	Luke Burns	Intermarché–Wanty
3	Sam Welsford	Isaac del Toro	Sam Welsford	Luke Burns	Isaac del Toro	Tristan Saunders	Intermarché–Wanty
4	Sam Welsford	Isaac del Toro	Sam Welsford	Luke Burns	Isaac del Toro	Jackson Medway	Intermarché–Wanty
5	Oscar Onley	Stephen Williams	Sam Welsford	Luke Burns	Oscar Onley	Casper Pedersen	UAE Team Emirates
6	Stephen Williams	Stephen Williams	Sam Welsford	Luke Burns	Isaac del Toro	António Morgado	Decathlon–AG2R La Mondiale
Final		Stephen Williams	Sam Welsford	Luke Burns	Isaac del Toro	Not awarded	Decathlon–AG2R La Mondiale

== Classification standings ==
Legend
Denotes the winner of the general classification	Denotes the winner of the sprints classification
Denotes the winner of the mountains classification	Denotes the winner of the young rider classification
Denotes the winner of the combativity award	

=== General classification ===
Final general classification (1–10)
Rank	Rider	Team	Time
1	Stephen Williams (GBR)	Israel–Premier Tech	19h 13' 34"
2	Jhonatan Narváez (ECU)	INEOS Grenadiers	+ 9"
3	Isaac del Toro (MEX)	UAE Team Emirates	+ 11"
4	Oscar Onley (GBR)	Team dsm–firmenich PostNL	+ 20"
5	Bart Lemmen (NED)	Visma–Lease a Bike	+ 23"
6	Julian Alaphilippe (FRA)	Soudal–Quick-Step	+ 33"
7	Simon Yates (GBR)	Team Jayco–AlUla	+ 33"
8	Valentin Paret-Peintre (FRA)	Decathlon–AG2R La Mondiale	+ 36"
9	Damien Howson (AUS)	Australia	+ 42"
10	Jack Haig (AUS)	Team Bahrain Victorious	+ 50"

=== Sprints classification ===
Final sprints classification (1–10)
Rank	Rider	Team	Points
1	Sam Welsford (AUS)	Bora–Hansgrohe	90
2	Biniam Girmay (ERI)	Intermarché–Wanty	77
3	Jhonatan Narváez (ECU)	INEOS Grenadiers	70
4	Stephen Williams (GBR)	Israel–Premier Tech	69
5	Isaac del Toro (MEX)	UAE Team Emirates	61
6	Laurence Pithie (NZL)	Groupama–FDJ	60
7	Max Kanter (GER)	Astana Qazaqstan Team	54
8	Caleb Ewan (AUS)	Team Jayco–AlUla	52
9	Lars Boven (NED)	Alpecin–Deceuninck	44
10	Phil Bauhaus (GER)	Team Bahrain Victorious	36

=== Mountains classification ===
Final mountains classification (1–10)
Rank	Rider	Team	Points
1	Luke Burns (AUS)	Australia	49
2	Jardi Christiaan van der Lee (NED)	EF Education–EasyPost	23
3	Gil Gelders (BEL)	Soudal–Quick-Step	20
4	Chris Harper (AUS)	Team Jayco–AlUla	12
5	Julian Alaphilippe (FRA)	Soudal–Quick-Step	10
6	António Morgado (POR)	UAE Team Emirates	8
7	Tristan Sanders (AUS)	Australia	8
8	Jacopo Mosca (ITA)	Lidl–Trek	7
9	Louis Barré (FRA)	Arkéa–B&B Hotels	6
10	Oscar Onley (GBR)	Team dsm–firmenich PostNL	6

=== Young rider classification ===
Final young rider classification (1–10)
Rank	Rider	Team	Time
1	Isaac del Toro (MEX)	UAE Team Emirates	19h 13' 45"
2	Oscar Onley (GBR)	Team dsm–firmenich PostNL	+ 9"
3	Bastien Tronchon (FRA)	AG2R Citroën Team	+ 1' 00"
4	Laurence Pithie (NZL)	Groupama–FDJ	+ 1' 01"
5	Gianmarco Garofoli (ITA)	Astana Qazaqstan Team	+ 2' 00"
6	António Morgado (POR)	UAE Team Emirates	+ 3' 33"
7	Joshua Tarling (GBR)	INEOS Grenadiers	+ 5' 32"
8	Loe van Belle (NED)	Visma–Lease a Bike	+ 7' 11"
9	Mathias Vacek (CZE)	Lidl–Trek	+ 8' 14"
10	Enzo Paleni (FRA)	Groupama–FDJ	+ 9' 01"

=== Teams classification ===
Final team classification (1–10)
Rank	Team	Time
1	(France) Decathlon–AG2R La Mondiale	57h 44' 14"
2	Israel–Premier Tech	+ 4"
3	(United Arab Emirates) UAE Team Emirates	+ 6"
4	(Belgium) Soudal–Quick-Step	+ 16"
5	(Netherlands) Visma–Lease a Bike	+ 24"
6	(Belgium) Intermarché–Wanty	+ 1' 42"
7	(Spain) Movistar Team	+ 1' 44"
8	(Belgium) Alpecin–Deceuninck	+ 1' 54"
9	(United States) Lidl–Trek	+ 2' 10"
10	Australia	+ 2' 39"
