= Andorra Cycling Masters =

Exhibition cycling race in Andorra

Race details
- Date: October
- Region: Andorra
- Discipline: Road
- Type: Exhibition
- Web site: visitandorra.com/en/events/andorra-cycling-masters/

History
- First edition: 2025
- Editions: 1 (as of 2025)
- First winner: Primož Roglič (SLO)
- Most recent: Primož Roglič (SLO)

The Andorra Cycling Masters is an invitation-only exhibition road cycling event, not sanctioned by the Union Cycliste Internationale (UCI), with its first inaugural edition in 2025. The event combines an uphill individual time trial climbing the Coll de la Gallina and a criterium with 15 laps of a 2.14 kilometres (1.33 mi) urban circuit in Andorra la Vella. Unlike UCI races, the event does not feature teams, instead only four riders participate in a "man-to-man" competition. The overall winner is determined from times in the time trial and points earned during sprints in the circuit, although an organizer stated in an interview that "the winner is mainly symbolic."

The first edition took place on 19 October 2025, with four participants: Tadej Pogačar, Jonas Vingegaard, Primož Roglič, and Isaac del Toro. The organizers had also initially wanted to invite Remco Evenepoel, but the exhibition did not fit with his schedule. Roglič was the overall winner, finishing first in the time trial and coming second to del Toro in the criterium.

== Editions ==
Year	Participants	Winner	Ref
2025	Isaac del Toro (MEX); Tadej Pogačar (SLO); Primož Roglič (SLO); Jonas Vingegaard (DEN)	Primož Roglič (SLO)	
