= Veneti =

Veneti or Venedi may refer to:

- Veneti (Gaul), an ancient Celtic tribe described by classical sources as living in what is now Brittany, France
- Adriatic Veneti, an ancient historical Italic people of northeastern Italy, who spoke an Italic language
- Vistula Veneti, an ancient Indo-European people of uncertain origin, who lived near the Vistula River and the Baltic Sea
- Veneti, modern residents of the Veneto region of Italy
- Vənədi, a village in Azerbaijan

== See also ==
- Venet, a surname
- Veneta (disambiguation)
- Venetia (disambiguation)
- Venetian (disambiguation)
- Veneto (disambiguation)
