= 2025 Critérium du Dauphiné =

French cycling race

2025 UCI World Tour, race 23 of 36

Race details
- Dates: 8–15 June 2025
- Stages: 8
- Distance: 1,199.6 km (745.4 mi)
- Winning time: 29h 19' 46"

Results
| Jersey awarded to the overall winner | Winner | Tadej Pogačar (SLO) | (UAE Team Emirates XRG) |
| | Second | Jonas Vingegaard (DEN) | (Visma–Lease a Bike) |
| | Third | Florian Lipowitz (GER) | (Red Bull–Bora–Hansgrohe) |
| Jersey awarded to the points classification winner | Points | Tadej Pogačar (SLO) | (UAE Team Emirates XRG) |
| Jersey awarded to the mountains classification winner | Mountains | Bruno Armirail (FRA) | (Decathlon–AG2R La Mondiale) |
| Jersey awarded to the young rider classification winner | Young rider | Florian Lipowitz (GER) | (Red Bull–Bora–Hansgrohe) |
| | Team | (Netherlands) Visma–Lease a Bike | |

The 2025 Critérium du Dauphiné was a road cycling stage race that took place between 8 and 15 June in the Dauphiné region of southeastern France. It was the 77th edition of Critérium du Dauphiné and the 23rd race of the 2025 UCI World Tour.

== Teams ==
All eighteen UCI WorldTeams and four UCI ProTeams made up the twenty-two teams that participated in the race.

UCI WorldTeams

- Alpecin–Deceuninck
- Arkéa–B&B Hotels
- Cofidis
- Decathlon–AG2R La Mondiale
- EF Education–EasyPost
- Groupama–FDJ
- INEOS Grenadiers
- Intermarché–Wanty
- Lidl–Trek
- Movistar Team
- Red Bull–Bora–Hansgrohe
- Soudal–Quick-Step
- Team Bahrain Victorious
- Team Picnic–PostNL
- Team Jayco–AlUla
- UAE Team Emirates XRG
- Visma–Lease a Bike
- XDS Astana Team

UCI ProTeams

- Israel–Premier Tech
- Team TotalEnergies
- Tudor Pro Cycling Team
- Uno-X Mobility

== Pre-race favourites ==
Tadej Pogacar, Jonas Vingegaard, and Remco Evenepoel were considered the favourites to win. Other contenders for the podium included Enric Mas, Mattias Skjelmose (who did not start), Carlos Rodriguez, Florian Lipowitz, and Santiago Buitrago.

== Route ==
Stage characteristics and winners
| Stage | Date | Course | Distance | Type | Stage winner |
|---|---|---|---|---|---|
| 1 | 8 June | Domérat to Montluçon | 195.8 km (121.7 mi) | Hilly stage | Tadej Pogačar (SLO) |
| 2 | 9 June | Prémilhat to Issoire | 204.6 km (127.1 mi) | Hilly stage | Jonathan Milan (ITA) |
| 3 | 10 June | Brioude to Charantonnay | 207.2 km (128.7 mi) | Hilly stage | Iván Romeo (ESP) |
| 4 | 11 June | Charmes-sur-Rhône to Saint-Péray | 17.4 km (10.8 mi) | Individual time trial | Remco Evenepoel (BEL) |
| 5 | 12 June | Saint-Priest to Mâcon | 183 km (114 mi) | Hilly stage | Jake Stewart (GBR) |
| 6 | 13 June | Valserhône to Combloux | 126.7 km (78.7 mi) | Medium-mountain stage | Tadej Pogačar (SLO) |
| 7 | 14 June | Grand-Aigueblanche to Valmeinier 1800 | 131.6 km (81.8 mi) | Mountain stage | Tadej Pogačar (SLO) |
| 8 | 15 June | Val-d'Arc to Val-Cenis | 133.3 km (82.8 mi) | Mountain stage | Lenny Martinez (FRA) |
| Total | | | 1,199.6 km (745.4 mi) | | |

== Stages ==
=== Stage 1 ===
8 June 2025 — Domérat to Montluçon, 195.8 km (121.7 mi)

Stage 1 Result
| Rank | Rider | Team | Time |
|---|---|---|---|
| 1 | Tadej Pogačar (SLO) | UAE Team Emirates XRG | 4h 40' 12" |
| 2 | Jonas Vingegaard (DEN) | Visma–Lease a Bike | + 0" |
| 3 | Mathieu van der Poel (NED) | Alpecin–Deceuninck | + 0" |
| 4 | Remco Evenepoel (BEL) | Soudal–Quick-Step | + 0" |
| 5 | Jake Stewart (GBR) | Israel–Premier Tech | + 0" |
| 6 | Hugo Page (FRA) | Intermarché–Wanty | + 0" |
| 7 | Bastien Tronchon (FRA) | Decathlon–AG2R La Mondiale | + 0" |
| 8 | Clément Venturini (FRA) | Arkéa–B&B Hotels | + 0" |
| 9 | Benjamin Thomas (FRA) | Cofidis | + 0" |
| 10 | Paul Penhoët (FRA) | Groupama–FDJ | + 0" |

General classification after Stage 1
| Rank | Rider | Team | Time |
|---|---|---|---|
| 1 | Tadej Pogačar (SLO) | UAE Team Emirates XRG | 4h 40' 02" |
| 2 | Jonas Vingegaard (DEN) | Visma–Lease a Bike | + 4" |
| 3 | Mathieu van der Poel (NED) | Alpecin–Deceuninck | + 6" |
| 4 | Nils Politt (GER) | UAE Team Emirates XRG | + 9" |
| 5 | Remco Evenepoel (BEL) | Soudal–Quick-Step | + 10" |
| 6 | Jake Stewart (GBR) | Israel–Premier Tech | + 10" |
| 7 | Hugo Page (FRA) | Intermarché–Wanty | + 10" |
| 8 | Bastien Tronchon (FRA) | Decathlon–AG2R La Mondiale | + 10" |
| 9 | Clément Venturini (FRA) | Arkéa–B&B Hotels | + 10" |
| 10 | Benjamin Thomas (FRA) | Cofidis | + 10" |

=== Stage 2 ===
9 June 2025 – Prémilhat to Issoire, 204.6 km (127.1 mi)

Stage 2 Result
| Rank | Rider | Team | Time |
|---|---|---|---|
| 1 | Jonathan Milan (ITA) | Lidl–Trek | 4h 54' 49" |
| 2 | Fred Wright (GBR) | Team Bahrain Victorious | + 0" |
| 3 | Mathieu van der Poel (NED) | Alpecin–Deceuninck | + 0" |
| 4 | Stian Fredheim (NOR) | Uno-X Mobility | + 0" |
| 5 | Emilien Jeannière (FRA) | Team TotalEnergies | + 0" |
| 6 | Bastien Tronchon (FRA) | Decathlon–AG2R La Mondiale | + 0" |
| 7 | Yevgeniy Fedorov (KAZ) | XDS Astana Team | + 0" |
| 8 | Matis Louvel (FRA) | Israel–Premier Tech | + 0" |
| 9 | Clément Venturini (FRA) | Arkéa–B&B Hotels | + 0" |
| 10 | Matteo Trentin (ITA) | Tudor Pro Cycling Team | + 0" |

General classification after Stage 2
| Rank | Rider | Team | Time |
|---|---|---|---|
| 1 | Jonathan Milan (ITA) | Lidl–Trek | 9h 34' 51" |
| 2 | Tadej Pogačar (SLO) | UAE Team Emirates XRG | + 0" |
| 3 | Mathieu van der Poel (NED) | Alpecin–Deceuninck | + 2" |
| 4 | Fred Wright (GBR) | Team Bahrain Victorious | + 4" |
| 5 | Jonas Vingegaard (DEN) | Visma–Lease a Bike | + 4" |
| 6 | Hugo Page (FRA) | Intermarché–Wanty | + 8" |
| 7 | Anders Foldager (DEN) | Team Jayco–AlUla | + 9" |
| 8 | Nils Politt (GER) | UAE Team Emirates XRG | + 9" |
| 9 | Bastien Tronchon (FRA) | Decathlon–AG2R La Mondiale | + 10" |
| 10 | Emilien Jeannière (FRA) | Team TotalEnergies | + 10" |

=== Stage 3 ===
10 June 2025 – Brioude to Charantonnay, 207.2 km (128.7 mi)

Stage 3 Result
| Rank | Rider | Team | Time |
|---|---|---|---|
| 1 | Iván Romeo (ESP) | Movistar Team | 4h 34' 10" |
| 2 | Harold Tejada (COL) | XDS Astana Team | + 14" |
| 3 | Louis Barré (FRA) | Intermarché–Wanty | + 14" |
| 4 | Florian Lipowitz (GER) | Red Bull–Bora–Hansgrohe | + 14" |
| 5 | Mathieu van der Poel (NED) | Alpecin–Deceuninck | + 27" |
| 6 | Axel Laurance (FRA) | INEOS Grenadiers | + 27" |
| 7 | Brieuc Rolland (FRA) | Groupama–FDJ | + 27" |
| 8 | Julien Bernard (FRA) | Lidl–Trek | + 27" |
| 9 | Andreas Leknessund (NOR) | Uno-X Mobility | + 27" |
| 10 | Eddie Dunbar (IRL) | Team Jayco–AlUla | + 29" |

General classification after Stage 3
| Rank | Rider | Team | Time |
|---|---|---|---|
| 1 | Iván Romeo (ESP) | Movistar Team | 14h 09' 01" |
| 2 | Louis Barré (FRA) | Intermarché–Wanty | + 17" |
| 3 | Harold Tejada (COL) | XDS Astana Team | + 18" |
| 4 | Florian Lipowitz (GER) | Red Bull–Bora–Hansgrohe | + 24" |
| 5 | Mathieu van der Poel (NED) | Alpecin–Deceuninck | + 29" |
| 6 | Brieuc Rolland (FRA) | Groupama–FDJ | + 37" |
| 7 | Andreas Leknessund (NOR) | Uno-X Mobility | + 37" |
| 8 | Eddie Dunbar (IRL) | Team Jayco–AlUla | + 39" |
| 9 | Tadej Pogačar (SLO) | UAE Team Emirates XRG | + 1' 06" |
| 10 | Fred Wright (GBR) | Team Bahrain Victorious | + 1' 12" |

=== Stage 4 ===
11 June 2025 – Charmes-sur-Rhône to Saint-Péray (ITT), 17.4 km (10.8 mi)

Stage 4 Result
| Rank | Rider | Team | Time |
|---|---|---|---|
| 1 | Remco Evenepoel (BEL) | Soudal–Quick-Step | 20' 50" |
| 2 | Jonas Vingegaard (DEN) | Visma–Lease a Bike | + 21" |
| 3 | Matteo Jorgenson (USA) | Visma–Lease a Bike | + 38" |
| 4 | Tadej Pogačar (SLO) | UAE Team Emirates XRG | + 49" |
| 5 | Florian Lipowitz (GER) | Red Bull–Bora–Hansgrohe | + 57" |
| 6 | Mathieu van der Poel (NED) | Alpecin–Deceuninck | + 1' 02" |
| 7 | Remi Cavagna (FRA) | Groupama–FDJ | + 1' 07" |
| 8 | Eddie Dunbar (IRL) | Team Jayco–AlUla | + 1' 10" |
| 9 | Tobias Foss (NOR) | INEOS Grenadiers | + 1' 10" |
| 10 | Paul Seixas (FRA) | Decathlon–AG2R La Mondiale | + 1' 12" |

General classification after Stage 4
| Rank | Rider | Team | Time |
|---|---|---|---|
| 1 | Remco Evenepoel (BEL) | Soudal–Quick-Step | 14h 31' 08" |
| 2 | Florian Lipowitz (GER) | Red Bull–Bora–Hansgrohe | + 4" |
| 3 | Iván Romeo (ESP) | Movistar Team | + 9" |
| 4 | Mathieu van der Poel (NED) | Alpecin–Deceuninck | + 14" |
| 5 | Jonas Vingegaard (DEN) | Visma–Lease a Bike | + 16" |
| 6 | Eddie Dunbar (IRL) | Team Jayco–AlUla | + 30" |
| 7 | Harold Tejada (COL) | XDS Astana Team | + 30" |
| 8 | Tadej Pogačar (SLO) | UAE Team Emirates XRG | + 38" |
| 9 | Matteo Jorgenson (USA) | Visma–Lease a Bike | + 39" |
| 10 | Louis Barré (FRA) | Intermarché–Wanty | + 1' 03" |

=== Stage 5 ===
12 June 2025 – Saint-Priest to Mâcon, 183 km (114 mi)

Stage 5 Result
| Rank | Rider | Team | Time |
|---|---|---|---|
| 1 | Jake Stewart (GBR) | Israel–Premier Tech | 4h 03' 46" |
| 2 | Axel Laurance (FRA) | INEOS Grenadiers | + 0" |
| 3 | Søren Wærenskjold (NOR) | Uno-X Mobility | + 0" |
| 4 | Laurence Pithie (NZL) | Red Bull–Bora–Hansgrohe | + 0" |
| 5 | Jonathan Milan (ITA) | Lidl–Trek | + 0" |
| 6 | Paul Penhoët (FRA) | Groupama–FDJ | + 0" |
| 7 | Emilien Jeannière (FRA) | Team TotalEnergies | + 0" |
| 8 | Fred Wright (GBR) | Team Bahrain Victorious | + 0" |
| 9 | Mathieu van der Poel (NED) | Alpecin–Deceuninck | + 0" |
| 10 | Bastien Tronchon (FRA) | Decathlon–AG2R La Mondiale | + 0" |

General classification after Stage 5
| Rank | Rider | Team | Time |
|---|---|---|---|
| 1 | Remco Evenepoel (BEL) | Soudal–Quick-Step | 18h 34' 54" |
| 2 | Florian Lipowitz (GER) | Red Bull–Bora–Hansgrohe | + 4" |
| 3 | Iván Romeo (ESP) | Movistar Team | + 9" |
| 4 | Mathieu van der Poel (NED) | Alpecin–Deceuninck | + 14" |
| 5 | Jonas Vingegaard (DEN) | Visma–Lease a Bike | + 16" |
| 6 | Eddie Dunbar (IRL) | Team Jayco–AlUla | + 30" |
| 7 | Tadej Pogačar (SLO) | UAE Team Emirates XRG | + 38" |
| 8 | Matteo Jorgenson (USA) | Visma–Lease a Bike | + 39" |
| 9 | Louis Barré (FRA) | Intermarché–Wanty | + 1' 03" |
| 10 | Paul Seixas (FRA) | Decathlon–AG2R La Mondiale | + 1' 13" |

=== Stage 6 ===
13 June 2025 – Valserhône to Combloux, 126.7 km (78.7 mi)

Stage 6 Result
| Rank | Rider | Team | Time |
|---|---|---|---|
| 1 | Tadej Pogačar (SLO) | UAE Team Emirates XRG | 2h 59' 46" |
| 2 | Jonas Vingegaard (DEN) | Visma–Lease a Bike | + 1' 01" |
| 3 | Florian Lipowitz (GER) | Red Bull–Bora–Hansgrohe | + 1' 22" |
| 4 | Matteo Jorgenson (USA) | Visma–Lease a Bike | + 1' 30" |
| 5 | Remco Evenepoel (BEL) | Soudal–Quick-Step | + 1' 50" |
| 6 | Alex Baudin (FRA) | EF Education–EasyPost | + 1' 56" |
| 7 | Tobias Halland Johannessen (NOR) | Uno-X Mobility | + 2' 03" |
| 8 | Louis Barré (FRA) | Intermarché–Wanty | + 2' 04" |
| 9 | Ben Tulett (GBR) | Visma–Lease a Bike | + 2' 04" |
| 10 | Paul Seixas (FRA) | Decathlon–AG2R La Mondiale | + 2' 04" |

General classification after Stage 6
| Rank | Rider | Team | Time |
|---|---|---|---|
| 1 | Tadej Pogačar (SLO) | UAE Team Emirates XRG | 21h 35' 08" |
| 2 | Jonas Vingegaard (DEN) | Visma–Lease a Bike | + 43" |
| 3 | Florian Lipowitz (GER) | Red Bull–Bora–Hansgrohe | + 54" |
| 4 | Remco Evenepoel (BEL) | Soudal–Quick-Step | + 1' 22" |
| 5 | Matteo Jorgenson (USA) | Visma–Lease a Bike | + 1' 41" |
| 6 | Eddie Dunbar (IRL) | Team Jayco–AlUla | + 2' 28" |
| 7 | Louis Barré (FRA) | Intermarché–Wanty | + 2' 39" |
| 8 | Paul Seixas (FRA) | Decathlon–AG2R La Mondiale | + 2' 49" |
| 9 | Tobias Halland Johannessen (NOR) | Uno-X Mobility | + 3' 21" |
| 10 | Ben Tulett (GBR) | Visma–Lease a Bike | + 3' 26" |

=== Stage 7 ===
14 June 2025 – Grand-Aigueblanche to Valmeinier 1800, 131.6 km (81.8 mi)

Stage 7 Result
| Rank | Rider | Team | Time |
|---|---|---|---|
| 1 | Tadej Pogačar (SLO) | UAE Team Emirates XRG | 4h 10' 00" |
| 2 | Jonas Vingegaard (DEN) | Visma–Lease a Bike | + 14" |
| 3 | Florian Lipowitz (GER) | Red Bull–Bora–Hansgrohe | + 1' 21" |
| 4 | Tobias Halland Johannessen (NOR) | Uno-X Mobility | + 2' 26" |
| 5 | Remco Evenepoel (BEL) | Soudal–Quick-Step | + 2' 39" |
| 6 | Ben Tulett (GBR) | Visma–Lease a Bike | + 3' 48" |
| 7 | Enric Mas (ESP) | Movistar Team | + 3' 48" |
| 8 | Emanuel Buchmann (GER) | Cofidis | + 3' 51" |
| 9 | Carlos Rodríguez (ESP) | INEOS Grenadiers | + 3' 51" |
| 10 | Guillaume Martin (FRA) | Groupama–FDJ | + 3' 51" |

General classification after Stage 7
| Rank | Rider | Team | Time |
|---|---|---|---|
| 1 | Tadej Pogačar (SLO) | UAE Team Emirates XRG | 25h 44' 58" |
| 2 | Jonas Vingegaard (DEN) | Visma–Lease a Bike | + 1' 01" |
| 3 | Florian Lipowitz (GER) | Red Bull–Bora–Hansgrohe | + 2' 21" |
| 4 | Remco Evenepoel (BEL) | Soudal–Quick-Step | + 4' 11" |
| 5 | Tobias Halland Johannessen (NOR) | Uno-X Mobility | + 5' 55" |
| 6 | Paul Seixas (FRA) | Decathlon–AG2R La Mondiale | + 6' 50" |
| 7 | Matteo Jorgenson (USA) | Visma–Lease a Bike | + 7' 18" |
| 8 | Ben Tulett (GBR) | Visma–Lease a Bike | + 7' 24" |
| 9 | Carlos Rodríguez (ESP) | INEOS Grenadiers | + 7' 41" |
| 10 | Enric Mas (ESP) | Movistar Team | + 7' 43" |

=== Stage 8 ===
15 June 2025 – Val-d'Arc to Val-Cenis, 133.3 km (82.8 mi)

Stage 8 Result
| Rank | Rider | Team | Time |
|---|---|---|---|
| 1 | Lenny Martinez (FRA) | Team Bahrain Victorious | 3h 34' 18" |
| 2 | Jonas Vingegaard (DEN) | Visma–Lease a Bike | + 34" |
| 3 | Tadej Pogačar (SLO) | UAE Team Emirates XRG | + 34" |
| 4 | Matteo Jorgenson (USA) | Visma–Lease a Bike | + 40" |
| 5 | Remco Evenepoel (BEL) | Soudal–Quick-Step | + 40" |
| 6 | Enric Mas (ESP) | Movistar Team | + 45" |
| 7 | Florian Lipowitz (GER) | Red Bull–Bora–Hansgrohe | + 47" |
| 8 | Tobias Halland Johannessen (NOR) | Uno-X Mobility | + 47" |
| 9 | Ben Healy (IRL) | EF Education–EasyPost | + 1' 01" |
| 10 | Sepp Kuss (USA) | Visma–Lease a Bike | + 1' 01" |

General classification after Stage 8
| Rank | Rider | Team | Time |
|---|---|---|---|
| 1 | Tadej Pogačar (SLO) | UAE Team Emirates XRG | 29h 19' 46" |
| 2 | Jonas Vingegaard (DEN) | Visma–Lease a Bike | + 59" |
| 3 | Florian Lipowitz (GER) | Red Bull–Bora–Hansgrohe | + 2' 38" |
| 4 | Remco Evenepoel (BEL) | Soudal–Quick-Step | + 4' 21" |
| 5 | Tobias Halland Johannessen (NOR) | Uno-X Mobility | + 6' 12" |
| 6 | Matteo Jorgenson (USA) | Visma–Lease a Bike | + 7' 28" |
| 7 | Enric Mas (ESP) | Movistar Team | + 7' 57" |
| 8 | Paul Seixas (FRA) | Decathlon–AG2R La Mondiale | + 8' 25" |
| 9 | Carlos Rodríguez (ESP) | INEOS Grenadiers | + 8' 57" |
| 10 | Guillaume Martin (FRA) | Groupama–FDJ | + 10' 01" |

== Classification leadership table ==
Classification leadership by stage
| Stage | Winner | General classification | Points classification | Mountains classification | Young rider classification | Team classification | Combativity award |
|---|---|---|---|---|---|---|---|
| 1 | Tadej Pogačar | Tadej Pogačar | Tadej Pogačar (Note: On stage 2, Jonas Vingegaard, who was second in the points classification, wore the green jersey, because first place Tadej Pogačar wore the yellow jersey as leader of the general classification.) | Paul Ourselin | Remco Evenepoel | Visma–Lease a Bike | Pierre Thierry |
| 2 | Jonathan Milan | Jonathan Milan | Mathieu van der Poel | Paul Ourselin | Jonathan Milan (Note: On stage 3, Hugo Page, who was second in the young rider classification, wore the white jersey, because first place Jonathan Milan wore the yellow jersey as leader of the general classification.) | Visma–Lease a Bike | Paul Ourselin |
| 3 | Iván Romeo | Iván Romeo | Mathieu van der Poel | Paul Ourselin | Iván Romeo (Note: On stage 4, Louis Barré, who is second in the young rider classification, wore the white jersey, because first place Iván Romeo wore the yellow jersey as leader of the general classification.) | Movistar Team | Mathieu van der Poel |
| 4 | Remco Evenepoel | Remco Evenepoel | Mathieu van der Poel | Paul Ourselin | Remco Evenepoel (Note: On stages 5 and 6, Florian Lipowitz, who was second in the young rider classification, wore the white jersey, because first place Remco Evenepoel wore the yellow jersey as leader of the general classification.) | Visma–Lease a Bike | no award |
| 5 | Jake Stewart | Remco Evenepoel | Mathieu van der Poel | Paul Ourselin | Remco Evenepoel | Visma–Lease a Bike | Benjamin Thomas |
| 6 | Tadej Pogačar | Tadej Pogačar | Mathieu van der Poel | Alex Baudin | Florian Lipowitz | Visma–Lease a Bike | Alex Baudin |
| 7 | Tadej Pogačar | Tadej Pogačar | Tadej Pogačar (Note: On stage 8, Mathieu van der Poel, who was second in the points classification, wore the green jersey, because first place Tadej Pogačar wore the yellow jersey as leader of the general classification.) | Tadej Pogačar (Note: On stage 8, Santiago Buitrago, who was second in the mountains classification, wore the polka dot jersey, because first place Tadej Pogačar wore the yellow jersey as leader of the general classification.) | Florian Lipowitz | Visma–Lease a Bike | Romain Bardet |
| 8 | Lenny Martinez | Tadej Pogačar | Tadej Pogačar | Bruno Armirail | Florian Lipowitz | Visma–Lease a Bike | Mathieu van der Poel |
| Final | | Tadej Pogačar | Tadej Pogačar | Bruno Armirail | Florian Lipowitz | Visma–Lease a Bike | |

== Classification standings ==
Legend
| Denotes the winner of the general classification | Denotes the winner of the young rider classification |
| Denotes the winner of the points classification | Denotes the winner of the team classification |
| Denotes the winner of the mountains classification | Denotes the winner of the combativity award |

=== General classification ===
Final general classification (1–10)
| Rank | Rider | Team | Time |
|---|---|---|---|
| 1 | Tadej Pogačar (SLO) | UAE Team Emirates XRG | 29h 19' 46" |
| 2 | Jonas Vingegaard (DEN) | Visma–Lease a Bike | + 59" |
| 3 | Florian Lipowitz (GER) | Red Bull–Bora–Hansgrohe | + 2' 38" |
| 4 | Remco Evenepoel (BEL) | Soudal–Quick-Step | + 4' 21" |
| 5 | Tobias Halland Johannessen (NOR) | Uno-X Mobility | + 6' 12" |
| 6 | Matteo Jorgenson (USA) | Visma–Lease a Bike | + 7' 28" |
| 7 | Enric Mas (ESP) | Movistar Team | + 7' 57" |
| 8 | Paul Seixas (FRA) | Decathlon–AG2R La Mondiale | + 8' 25" |
| 9 | Carlos Rodríguez (ESP) | INEOS Grenadiers | + 8' 57" |
| 10 | Guillaume Martin (FRA) | Groupama–FDJ | + 10' 01" |

=== Points classification ===
Final points classification (1–10)
| Rank | Rider | Team | Points |
|---|---|---|---|
| 1 | Tadej Pogačar (SLO) | UAE Team Emirates XRG | 79 |
| 2 | Mathieu van der Poel (NED) | Alpecin–Deceuninck | 79 |
| 3 | Jonas Vingegaard (DEN) | Visma–Lease a Bike | 70 |
| 4 | Remco Evenepoel (BEL) | Soudal–Quick-Step | 55 |
| 5 | Florian Lipowitz (GER) | Red Bull–Bora–Hansgrohe | 48 |
| 6 | Jonathan Milan (ITA) | Lidl–Trek | 41 |
| 7 | Axel Laurance (FRA) | INEOS Grenadiers | 36 |
| 8 | Louis Barré (FRA) | Intermarché–Wanty | 33 |
| 9 | Bastien Tronchon (FRA) | Decathlon–AG2R La Mondiale | 32 |
| 10 | Fred Wright (GBR) | Team Bahrain Victorious | 32 |

=== Mountains classification ===
Final mountains classification (1–10)
| Rank | Rider | Team | Points |
|---|---|---|---|
| 1 | Bruno Armirail (FRA) | Decathlon–AG2R La Mondiale | 36 |
| 2 | Tadej Pogačar (SLO) | UAE Team Emirates XRG | 33 |
| 3 | Sergio Higuita (COL) | XDS Astana Team | 27 |
| 4 | Jonas Vingegaard (DEN) | Visma–Lease a Bike | 26 |
| 5 | Lenny Martinez (FRA) | Team Bahrain Victorious | 23 |
| 6 | Juan Guillermo Martínez (COL) | Team Picnic–PostNL | 18 |
| 7 | Romain Bardet (FRA) | Team Picnic–PostNL | 16 |
| 8 | Florian Lipowitz (GER) | Red Bull–Bora–Hansgrohe | 15 |
| 9 | Mathieu van der Poel (NED) | Alpecin–Deceuninck | 14 |
| 10 | Alex Baudin (FRA) | EF Education–EasyPost | 13 |

=== Young rider classification ===
Final young rider classification (1–10)
| Rank | Rider | Team | Time |
|---|---|---|---|
| 1 | Florian Lipowitz (GER) | Red Bull–Bora–Hansgrohe | 29h 22' 24" |
| 2 | Remco Evenepoel (BEL) | Soudal–Quick-Step | + 1' 43" |
| 3 | Paul Seixas (FRA) | Decathlon–AG2R La Mondiale | + 5' 47" |
| 4 | Carlos Rodriguez (ESP) | INEOS Grenadiers | + 6' 19" |
| 5 | Ben Tulett (GBR) | Visma–Lease a Bike | + 10' 30" |
| 6 | Mathys Rondel (FRA) | Tudor Pro Cycling Team | + 14' 21" |
| 7 | Lenny Martinez (FRA) | Team Bahrain Victorious | + 36' 14" |
| 8 | Louis Barré (FRA) | Intermarché–Wanty | + 39' 25" |
| 9 | Ben Healy (IRL) | EF Education–EasyPost | + 45' 13" |
| 10 | Iván Romeo (ESP) | Movistar Team | + 46' 37" |

=== Team classification ===
Final team classification (1–10)
| Rank | Team | Time |
|---|---|---|
| 1 | (Netherlands) Visma–Lease a Bike | 88h 16' 04" |
| 2 | (France) Decathlon–AG2R La Mondiale | + 39' 05" |
| 3 | Team Bahrain Victorious | + 49' 21" |
| 4 | (Germany) Red Bull–Bora–Hansgrohe | + 51' 22" |
| 5 | (United Arab Emirates) UAE Team Emirates XRG | + 51' 46" |
| 6 | (Spain) Movistar Team | + 54' 57" |
| 7 | (United States) EF Education–EasyPost | + 1h 10' 54" |
| 8 | (United Kingdom) INEOS Grenadiers | + 1h 16' 28" |
| 9 | (France) Groupama–FDJ | + 1h 17' 29" |
| 10 | (Belgium) Soudal–Quick-Step | + 1h 28' 58" |
