= Venet =

Notable people with the surname:

- Bernar Venet (born 1941), French artist
- Nick Venet (1936–1998), American record producer
- Philippe Venet (1929–2021), French fashion designer

Venet is a name of a mountain in Tyrol, Astria.

== See also ==
- Veneti (disambiguation)
- Venets (disambiguation)
- Vinet
