= Venets =

Venets (Bulgarian: Венец, pronounced [vɛˈnɛt͡s]; also transliterated Venec or Venetz, meaning "wreath") may refer to the following Bulgarian villages:

- Venets, Burgas Province
- Venets, Shumen Province, the administrative centre of Venets municipality
  - Venets Transmitter
- Venets, Stara Zagora Province

== See also ==
- Venet, a surname
- Ignaz Venetz, Swiss scientist
