= 2025 Clásica Jaén Paraíso Interior =

2025 UCI Europe Tour

Race details
- Dates: 17 February 2025
- Distance: 169.2 km (105.1 mi)
- Winning time: 4h 00' 25"

Results
	Winner	Michał Kwiatkowski (POL)	(Ineos Grenadiers)
	Second	Isaac del Toro (MEX)	(UAE Team Emirates XRG)
	Third	Ibon Ruiz (ESP)	(Equipo Kern Pharma)

The 2025 Clásica Jaén Paraíso Interior was the fourth edition of the Clásica Jaén Paraíso Interior road cycling race. It was held on 17 February 2025 in the titular province of Spain as a category 1.1 event on the 2025 UCI Europe Tour calendar.

== Teams ==
Five UCI WorldTeams, six UCI ProTeams, one UCI Continental and one national team made up the thirteen teams that participated in the race.

UCI WorldTeams

- Decathlon–AG2R La Mondiale
- Ineos Grenadiers
- Movistar Team
- UAE Team Emirates XRG
- Visma–Lease a Bike

UCI ProTeams

- Burgos Burpellet BH
- Caja Rural–Seguros RGA
- Equipo Kern Pharma
- Euskaltel–Euskadi
- Q36.5 Pro Cycling Team
- Team Flanders–Baloise

UCI Continental Teams

- Illes Balears Arabay

National Teams

- Spain

== Results ==
Result
Rank	Rider	Team	Time
1	Michał Kwiatkowski (POL)	Ineos Grenadiers	4h 00' 25"
2	Isaac del Toro (MEX)	UAE Team Emirates XRG	+ 31"
3	Ibon Ruiz (ESP)	Equipo Kern Pharma	+ 46"
4	Jordan Labrosse (FRA)	Decathlon–AG2R La Mondiale	+ 1' 53"
5	Axel Laurance (FRA)	Ineos Grenadiers	+ 1' 53"
6	Eric Fagúndez (URU)	Burgos Burpellet BH	+ 1' 57"
7	Clément Berthet (FRA)	Decathlon–AG2R La Mondiale	+ 1' 57"
8	Carlos Canal (ESP)	Movistar Team	+ 1' 57"
9	Ben Tulett (GBR)	Visma–Lease a Bike	+ 1' 59"
10	Tim Wellens (BEL)	UAE Team Emirates XRG	+ 2' 00"
