= Vov =

- Municipality
- Location within Azerbaijan
- Coordinates: 38°38′01″N 48°37′54″E
- Country: Azerbaijan
- Rayon: Lerik

Population
  - Total: 462
- Time zone: UTC+4 (AZT)
  - Summer (DST): UTC+5 (AZT)

Vov is a village and municipality in the Lerik Rayon of Azerbaijan. It has a population of 462. The municipality consists of the villages of Vov, Vənədi, and Nısovyədi.
