= 2025 Tre Valli Varesine =

- 2025 UCI ProSeries

Race details
- Dates: 7 October 2025
- Stages: 1
- Distance: 200.3 km (124.5 mi)
- Winning time: 4h 34' 32"

Results
	Winner	Tadej Pogačar (SLO)	(UAE Team Emirates XRG)
	Second	Albert Philipsen (DEN)	(Lidl–Trek)
	Third	Julian Alaphilippe (FRA)	(Tudor Pro Cycling Team)

The 2025 Tre Valli Varesine was the 104th edition of the Tre Valli Varesine road cycling one day race, which was held from Busto Arsizio to Legnano, Italy, on 7 October 2025.

== Teams ==
Seventeen UCI WorldTeams and seven UCI ProTeams made up the twenty-four teams that participated in the race.

UCI WorldTeams

- Alpecin–Deceuninck
- Cofidis
- Decathlon–AG2R La Mondiale
- EF Education–EasyPost
- Groupama–FDJ
- Ineos Grenadiers
- Intermarché–Wanty
- Lidl–Trek
- Movistar Team
- Red Bull–Bora–Hansgrohe
- Soudal–Quick-Step
- Team Bahrain Victorious
- Team Jayco–AlUla
- Team Picnic–PostNL
- UAE Team Emirates XRG
- Visma–Lease a Bike
- XDS Astana Team

UCI ProTeams

- Burgos Burpellet BH
- Q36.5 Pro Cycling Team
- Team Polti VisitMalta
- Tudor Pro Cycling Team
- Team Solution Tech–Vini Fantini
- Uno-X Mobility
- VF Group–Bardiani–CSF–Faizanè

== Results ==
Result
Rank	Rider	Team	Time
1	Tadej Pogačar (SLO)	UAE Team Emirates XRG	4h 13' 09"
2	Albert Philipsen (DEN)	Lidl–Trek	+ 46"
3	Julian Alaphilippe (FRA)	Tudor Pro Cycling Team	+ 46"
4	Paul Lapeira (FRA)	Decathlon–AG2R La Mondiale	+ 46"
5	Sergio Higuita (COL)	XDS Astana Team	+ 46"
6	Toms Skujiņš (LAT)	Lidl–Trek	+ 46"
7	Tobias Halland Johannessen (NOR)	Uno-X Mobility	+ 46"
8	Isaac del Toro (MEX)	UAE Team Emirates XRG	+ 46"
9	Johannes Kulset (NOR)	Uno-X Mobility	+ 46"
10	Ion Izagirre (ESP)	Cofidis	+ 46"
