= Veneta =

Veneta may refer to:

- Veneta, Oregon, a city in Oregon, United States
- Veneta Krasteva (born 1991), a Bulgarian beauty pageant winner

== See also ==
- Veneti (disambiguation)
- Veneto (disambiguation)
