= 2025 UCI ProSeries =

International road cycling contest

- Sixth edition of the UCI ProSeries

Details
- Dates: 5 February – 19 October
- Location: Asia, Europe, United States
- Races: 57

The 2025 UCI ProSeries was the sixth season of the UCI ProSeries, the second tier road cycling tour, below the UCI World Tour, but above the various regional UCI Continental Circuits.

The calendar consists of 58 events, of which 35 are one-day races (1.Pro), and 23 are stage races (2.Pro). There are 51 events in Europe, five in Asia, and one in the United States.

== Events ==
Races in the 2025 UCI ProSeries
Race	Date	Winner	Team	Ref.
(Spain) Volta a la Comunitat Valenciana	5–9 February	Santiago Buitrago (COL)	Team Bahrain Victorious	
Tour of Oman	8–12 February	Adam Yates (GBR)	UAE Team Emirates XRG	
(Spain) Clásica de Almería	16 February	Milan Fretin (BEL)	Cofidis	
(Portugal) Figueira Champions Classic	16 February	António Morgado (POR)	UAE Team Emirates XRG	
(Spain) Vuelta a Andalucía	19–23 February	Pavel Sivakov (FRA)	UAE Team Emirates XRG	
(Portugal) Volta ao Algarve	19–23 February	Jonas Vingegaard (DEN)	Visma–Lease a Bike	
(France) Faun-Ardèche Classic	1 March	Romain Grégoire (FRA)	Groupama–FDJ	
(France) Faun Drôme Classic	2 March	Juan Ayuso (ESP)	UAE Team Emirates XRG	
(Belgium) Kuurne–Brussels–Kuurne	2 March	Jasper Philipsen (BEL)	Alpecin–Deceuninck	
(Italy) Trofeo Laigueglia	5 March	Juan Ayuso (ESP)	UAE Team Emirates XRG	
(Italy) Milano–Torino	19 March	Isaac del Toro (MEX)	UAE Team Emirates XRG	
(Belgium) Nokere Koerse	19 March	Nils Eekhoff (NED)	Team Picnic–PostNL	
(France) GP de Denain	20 March	Matthew Brennan (GBR)	Visma–Lease a Bike	
(Belgium) Bredene Koksijde Classic	21 March	Edward Theuns (BEL)	Lidl–Trek	
(Spain) GP Miguel Induráin	5 April	Thibau Nys (BEL)	Lidl–Trek	
(China) Tour of Hainan	7–11 April	Kyrylo Tsarenko (UKR)	Team Solution Tech–Vini Fantini	
(Belgium) Scheldeprijs	9 April	Tim Merlier (BEL)	Soudal–Quick-Step	
(Belgium) Brabantse Pijl	18 April	Remco Evenepoel (BEL)	Soudal–Quick-Step	
(Italy) Tour of the Alps	21–25 April	Michael Storer (AUS)	Tudor Pro Cycling Team	
(Turkey) Tour of Turkiye	27 April – 4 May	Wout Poels (NED)	XDS Astana Team	
(France) GP du Morbihan	10 May	Benoît Cosnefroy (FRA)	Decathlon–AG2R La Mondiale	
(France) Tro-Bro Léon	11 May	Bastien Tronchon (FRA)	Decathlon–AG2R La Mondiale	
(France) Classique Dunkerque	13 May	Pascal Ackermann (GER)	Israel–Premier Tech	
(Hungary) Tour de Hongrie	14–18 May	Harold Martín López (ECU)	XDS Astana Team	
(France) Four Days of Dunkirk	14–18 May	Samuel Watson (GBR)	Ineos Grenadiers	
Tour of Norway	29 May – 1 June	Matthew Brennan (GBR)	Visma–Lease a Bike	
(France) Boucles de la Mayenne	29 May – 1 June	Aaron Gate (NZL)	XDS Astana Team	
Tour of Slovenia	4–8 June	Anders Halland Johannessen (NOR)	Uno-X Mobility	
(Belgium) Brussels Cycling Classic	8 June	Tim Merlier (BEL)	Soudal–Quick-Step	
(Belgium) Dwars door het Hageland	14 June	Paul Magnier (FRA)	Soudal–Quick-Step	
(France) CIC - Mont Ventoux	17 June	Cancelled		
Tour of Belgium	18–22 June	Filippo Baroncini (ITA)	UAE Team Emirates XRG	
(China) Tour of Magnificent Qinghai	6–13 July	Henok Mulubrhan (ERI)	XDS Astana Team	
(Belgium) Tour de Wallonie	26–30 July	Corbin Strong (NZL)	Israel–Premier Tech	
(Spain) Vuelta a Burgos	5–9 August	Isaac del Toro (MEX)	UAE Team Emirates XRG	
Arctic Race of Norway	7–10 August	Corbin Strong (NZL)	Israel–Premier Tech	
Tour of Denmark	12–16 August	Mads Pedersen (DEN)	Lidl–Trek	
(Belgium) Circuit Franco–Belge	15 August	Jonas Abrahamsen (NOR)	Uno-X Mobility	
(Germany) Deutschland Tour	20–24 August	Søren Wærenskjold (NOR)	Uno-X Mobility	
(United Kingdom) Tour of Britain	2–7 September	Romain Grégoire (FRA)	Groupama–FDJ	
(United States) Maryland Cycling Classic	6 September	Sandy Dujardin (FRA)	Team TotalEnergies	
(Italy) GP Industria & Artigianato	7 September	Isaac del Toro (MEX)	UAE Team Emirates XRG	
(Italy) Coppa Sabatini	11 September	Isaac del Toro (MEX)	UAE Team Emirates XRG	
(France) GP de Fourmies	14 September	Paul Magnier (FRA)	Soudal–Quick-Step	
(Belgium) GP de Wallonie	17 September	Arnaud De Lie (BEL)	Lotto	
Tour de Luxembourg	17–21 September	Brandon McNulty (USA)	UAE Team Emirates XRG	
(Belgium) Super 8 Classic	20 September	Arnaud De Lie (BEL)	Lotto	
(Malaysia) Tour de Langkawi	28 September – 5 October	Joris Delbove (FRA)	Team TotalEnergies	
(Germany) Münsterland Giro	3 October	Jasper Philipsen (BEL)	Alpecin–Deceuninck	
(Italy) Giro dell'Emilia	4 October	Isaac del Toro (MEX)	UAE Team Emirates XRG	
(Italy) Coppa Bernocchi	6 October	Dorian Godon (FRA)	Decathlon–AG2R La Mondiale	
(Italy) Tre Valli Varesine	7 October	Tadej Pogačar (SLO)	UAE Team Emirates XRG	
(China) Tour of Taihu Lake	9–12 October	Matteo Malucelli (ITA)	XDS Astana Team	
(Italy) Gran Piemonte	9 October	Isaac del Toro (MEX)	UAE Team Emirates XRG	
(France) Paris–Tours	12 October	Matteo Trentin (ITA)	Tudor Pro Cycling Team	
(Italy) Giro del Veneto	15 October	Isaac del Toro (MEX)	UAE Team Emirates XRG	
(Italy) Veneto Classic	19 October	Sakarias Koller Løland (NOR)	Uno-X Mobility	
Japan Cup	19 October	Lenny Martinez (FRA)	Team Bahrain Victorious	
