= Nısovyədi =

Village in Lerik District, Azerbaijan

Coordinates: 38°37′39″N 48°36′16″E

Nısovyədi is a village in the municipality of Vov in the Lerik Rayon of Azerbaijan.
