= 2026 Grand Prix Cycliste de Montréal =

One-day cycling race in Canada

2026 UCI World Tour, race 34 of 36

Race details
- Dates: 13 September 2026
- Stages: 1
- Distance: 214.4 km (133.2 mi)
- Winning time: 5h 13' 16"

Results
	Winner	Isaac del Toro (MEX)	(UAE Team Emirates XRG)
	Second	Paul Seixas (FRA)	(Decathlon–AG2R La Mondiale)
	Third	Brandon McNulty (USA)	(UAE Team Emirates XRG)

The 2026 Grand Prix Cycliste de Montréal was a road cycling one-day race that took place on 13 September 2026 in Montréal, Canada. It was the 15th edition of the Grand Prix Cycliste de Montréal and the 34th event of the 2026 UCI World Tour. The race was won by Mexican Isaac del Toro of UAE Team Emirates XRG.

== Teams ==
All eighteen UCI WorldTeams, three UCI ProTeams, and the Canadian national team made up the twenty-two teams that participated in the race.

UCI WorldTeams

- Alpecin–Premier Tech
- Decathlon CMA CGM
- EF Education–EasyPost
- Groupama–FDJ United
- Lidl–Trek
- Lotto–Intermarché
- Movistar Team
- Netcompany INEOS
- NSN Cycling Team
- Red Bull–Bora–Hansgrohe
- Soudal–Quick-Step
- Team Bahrain Victorious
- Team Picnic–PostNL
- Team Jayco–AlUla
- Visma–Lease a Bike
- UAE Team Emirates XRG
- Uno-X Mobility
- XDS Astana Team

UCI ProTeams

- Modern Adventure Pro Cycling
- Pinarello–Q36.5 Pro Cycling Team
- Tudor Pro Cycling Team

National Teams

- Canada

== Course ==
The race used a hilly 13.4-kilometre (8.3 mi) circuit around Mount Royal, with the longest climb being Côte Camilien-Houde (1.8 km long and 8% average grade). 16 laps of the circuit make the race 214.4 kilometres (133.2 mi) in length.

== Result ==
Result
Rank	Rider	Team	Time
1	Isaac del Toro (MEX)	UAE Team Emirates XRG	5h 13' 16"
2	Paul Seixas (FRA)	Decathlon CMA CGM	+ 0"
3	Brandon McNulty (USA)	UAE Team Emirates XRG	+ 27"
4	Quinn Simmons (USA)	Lidl–Trek	+ 30"
5	Remco Evenepoel (BEL)	Red Bull–Bora–Hansgrohe	+ 35"
6	Tom Pidcock (GBR)	Pinarello–Q36.5 Pro Cycling Team	+ 36"
7	Giulio Ciccone (ITA)	Lidl–Trek	+ 36"
8	Ben Healy (IRL)	EF Education–EasyPost	+ 36"
9	Afonso Eulálio (POR)	Team Bahrain Victorious	+ 39"
10	Lennert van Eetvelt (BEL)	Lotto–Intermarché	+ 39"
