= Veneto (disambiguation) =

Veneto is a region of northern Italy.

Veneto may also refer to:

== People ==
- Armando Veneto, Italian politician
- Bartolomeo Veneto, Italian painter

== Military ==
- Italian battleship Vittorio Veneto
- Italian cruiser Vittorio Veneto (550)
- Battle of Vittorio Veneto, 1918
- 159th Infantry Division Veneto, World War II

== Sport ==
- Eccellenza Veneto, an Italian football division
- Giro del Veneto, an Italian bicycle race

== Other uses ==
- Veneto-, a prefix used when referring to either Venice or Veneto, as in "Veneto–Greek"
- Ateneo Veneto, an institution
- Atlante Veneto, an atlas
- Together for Veneto, a political coalition
- Veneto wine
- Via Veneto, a street in Rome

== See also ==
- Veneta (disambiguation)
- Veneti (disambiguation)
