= 2025 Giro del Veneto =

2025 UCI ProSeries

Race details
- Dates: 15 October 2025
- Stages: 1
- Distance: 161 km (100.0 mi)
- Winning time: 3h 24' 29"

Results
	Winner	Isaac del Toro (MEX)	(UAE Team Emirates XRG)
	Second	Pavel Sivakov (FRA)	(UAE Team Emirates XRG)
	Third	Jonas Abrahamsen (NOR)	(Uno-X Mobility)

The 2025 Giro del Veneto was the 88th edition of the Giro del Veneto road cycling one day race, which was held on 15 October 2025 as part of the 2025 UCI ProSeries calendar.

== Teams ==
Six UCI WorldTeams, nine UCI ProTeams and six UCI Continental teams made up the 21 teams that participated in the race.

UCI WorldTeams

- Alpecin–Deceuninck
- Cofidis
- Groupama–FDJ
- Team Jayco–AlUla
- UAE Team Emirates XRG
- XDS Astana Team

UCI ProTeams

- Burgos Burpellet BH
- Caja Rural–Seguros RGA
- Equipo Kern Pharma
- Lotto
- Q36.5 Pro Cycling Team
- Team Polti VisitMalta
- Tudor Pro Cycling Team
- Uno-X Mobility
- VF Group–Bardiani–CSF–Faizanè

UCI Continental Teams

- Biesse–Carrera–Premac
- General Store–Essegibi–Fratelli Curia
- MBH Bank Ballan CSB
- MG.K Vis Costruzioni e Ambiente
- Petrolike
- S.C. Padovani Polo Cherry Bank

== Results ==
Result
Rank	Rider	Team	Time
1	Isaac del Toro (MEX)	UAE Team Emirates XRG	3h 24' 29"
2	Pavel Sivakov (FRA)	UAE Team Emirates XRG	+ 22"
3	Jonas Abrahamsen (NOR)	Uno-X Mobility	+ 22"
4	Eric Fagúndez (URU)	Burgos Burpellet BH	+ 22"
5	Simone Velasco (ITA)	XDS Astana Team	+ 22"
6	Benjamin Thomas (FRA)	Cofidis	+ 22"
7	Romain Grégoire (FRA)	Groupama–FDJ	+ 22"
8	Johannes Kulset (NOR)	Uno-X Mobility	+ 22"
9	Filippo Zana (ITA)	Team Jayco–AlUla	+ 22"
10	Davide De Pretto (ITA)	Team Jayco–AlUla	+ 22"
