= Vənədi =

Village in Lerik District, Azerbaijan

Coordinates: 38°38′N 48°37′E

Vənədi is a village in the municipality of Vov in the Lerik Rayon of Azerbaijan.
