= Clásica Terres de l'Ebre =

Spanish one-day road cycling race

Clàssica Terres de l'Ebre
Race details
- Date: March
- Region: Terres de l'Ebre, Catalonia, Spain
- Discipline: Road race
- Competition: UCI Europe Tour
- Type: Single day race
- Organiser: Club Esportiu Montsià
- Web site: classicaterresdelebre.cat

History
- First edition: 2024
- Editions: 3 (as of 2026)
- First winner: Abel Balderstone (ESP)
- Most wins: No repeat winners
- Most recent: José Manuel Díaz Gallego (ESP)

The Clàssica Terres de l'Ebre is a one-day road cycling race held annually in the Terres de l'Ebre region of Catalonia, Spain.

The race was first held in 2024 as a category 1.2 event on the UCI Europe Tour, before upgrading to 1.1 status in 2025.

== Winners ==
Year	Country	Rider	Team
2024	Spain	Abel Balderstone	Caja Rural–Seguros RGA
2025	Mexico	Isaac del Toro	UAE Team Emirates XRG
2026	Spain	José Manuel Díaz Gallego	Burgos Burpellet BH
