= Giro del Veneto =

Semi classic cycling race in Italy

Race details
- Date: Early-September
- Region: Veneto, Italy
- English name: Tour of Veneto
- Local name: Giro del Veneto (in Italian)
- Discipline: Road
- Competition: UCI ProSeries
- Type: One-day
- Organiser: Società Ciclisti Padovani
- Web site: www.girodelveneto.com

History
- First edition: 1909
- Editions: 90 (as of 2026)
- First winner: Renato Pogliani (ITA)
- Most wins: Costante Girardengo (ITA) (4 wins)
- Most recent: Alessandro Covi (ITA)

The Giro del Veneto is a semi classic European bicycle race held in the region of Veneto, Italy. Since 2023, the race has been on the UCI ProSeries calendar, having previously been a 1.1 event on the UCI Europe Tour.

In 2012 the race merged with another Italian classic, Coppa Placci, after some financial problems, and was held under the name "Giro Del Veneto – Coppa Placci". It was to be the last edition for 9 years. In 2021, after a hiatus of 9 years, the race returned under its original name "Giro del Veneto".

== Winners ==
Year	Country	Rider	Team
1909	Italy	Luigi Pogliani	individual
1910– 1911	No race		
1912	Italy	Giovanni Roncon	Ranella
1913– 1921	No race		
1922	Italy	Alfredo Sivocci	Legnano–Pirelli
1923	Italy	Costante Girardengo	Maino
1924	Italy	Costante Girardengo	Maino
1925	Italy	Costante Girardengo	Wolsit–Pirelli
1926	Italy	Costante Girardengo	Wolsit–Pirelli
1927	Italy	Alfonso Piccin	Christophe–Hutchinson
1928	Italy	Alfredo Binda	Legnano-Torpedo
1929	Italy	Aldo Canazza	individual
1930	Italy	Aldo Canazza	Paletti
1931– 1933	No race		
1934	Italy	Aldo Canazza	Gloria
1935	Italy	Vasco Bergamaschi	Maino–Girardengo
1936	Italy	Renato Scorticati	Maino
1937	No race		
1938	Italy	Secondo Magni	Legnano
1939	Italy	Adolfo Leoni	Bianchi
1940	No race		
1941	Italy	Fausto Coppi	Legnano
1942	Italy	Pierino Favalli	Legnano
1943– 1944	No race		
1945	Italy	Luigi Casola	individual
1946	No race		
1947	Italy	Fausto Coppi	Bianchi
1948	Italy	Luciano Maggini	Wilier Triestina
1949	Italy	Fausto Coppi	Bianchi–Ursus
1950	Italy	Luigi Casola	Atala–Pirelli
1951	Italy	Antonio Bevilacqua	Benotto–Ursus
1952	Italy	Adolfo Grosso	Benotto–Fiorelli
1953	Italy	Fiorenzo Magni	Ganna–Ursus
1954	Italy	Luciano Maggini	Atala–Pirelli
1955	Italy	Adolfo Grosso	Atala–Pirelli
1956	Italy	Giorgio Albani	Legnano
1957	Italy	Angelo Conterno	Bianchi–Pirelli
1958	Italy	Adriano Zamboni	Torpado
1959	Italy	Rino Benedetti	Ghigi–Ganna
1960	Italy	Diego Ronchini	Bianchi
1961	Italy	Nino Defilippis	Carpano
1962	Spain	Angelino Soler	Ghigi
1963	Italy	Italo Zilioli	Carpano
1964	Italy	Italo Zilioli	Carpano
1965	Italy	Michele Dancelli	Molteni
1966	Italy	Michele Dancelli	Molteni
1967	Italy	Luciano Galbo	Max Meyer
1968	Italy	Alberto Della Torre	Filotex
1969	Italy	Giacomino Denti	Scic
1970	Italy	Franco Bitossi	Filotex
1971	Italy	Giancarlo Polidori	Scic
1972	Italy	Enrico Paolini	Scic
1973	Italy	Franco Bitossi	Sammontana
1974	Belgium	Roger De Vlaeminck	Brooklyn
1975	Switzerland	Roland Salm	Zonca–Santini
1976	Italy	Alfio Vandi	Magniflex–Torpado
1977	Italy	Giuseppe Saronni	Scic
1978	Italy	Valerio Lualdi	Bianchi–Faema
1979	Italy	Francesco Moser	Sanson–Luxor TV
1980	Italy	Carmelo Barone	Sanson–Campagnolo
1981	Italy	Giovanni Mantovani	Hoonved–Bottecchia
1982	Italy	Pierino Gavazzi	Atala–Campagnolo
1983	Denmark	Jesper Worre	Sammontana–Campagnolo
1984	Italy	Moreno Argentin	Sammontana–Campagnolo
1985	Italy	Claudio Corti	Supermercati Brianzoli
1986	Italy	Maurizio Rossi	Ecoflam–Jolly–BFB
1987	Austria	Gerhard Zadrobilek	Supermercati Brianzoli–Chateau d'Ax
1988	Italy	Moreno Argentin	Gewiss–Ballan
1989	Italy	Roberto Pagnin	Malvor–Sidi
1990	Italy	Massimo Ghirotto	Carrera Jeans–Vagabond
1991	Italy	Roberto Pagnin	Lotus–Festina
1992	Italy	Massimo Ghirotto	Carrera Jeans–Vagabond
1993	Italy	Maximilian Sciandri	Motorola
1994	Italy	Gianluca Bortolami	Mapei–CLAS
1995	Italy	Flavio Vanzella	MG Maglificio–Technogym
1996	Italy	Michele Bartoli	MG Maglificio–Technogym
1997	No race		
1998	Italy	Davide Rebellin	Team Polti
1999	Italy	Davide Rebellin	Team Polti
2000	Italy	Davide Rebellin	Liquigas–Pata
2001	Italy	Giuliano Figueras	Ceramiche Panaria–Fiordo
2002	Italy	Danilo Di Luca	Saeco–Longoni Sport
2003	Italy	Cristian Moreni	Alessio
2004	Italy	Gilberto Simoni	Saeco
2005	Italy	Eddy Mazzoleni	Lampre–Caffita
2006	Italy	Rinaldo Nocentini	Acqua & Sapone
2007	Italy	Alessandro Bertolini	Diquigiovanni–Selle Italia
2008	Italy	Francesco Ginanni	Diquigiovanni–Androni
2009	Italy	Filippo Pozzato	Team Katusha
2010	Italy	Daniel Oss	Liquigas–Doimo
2011	No race		
2012	Italy	Oscar Gatto	Farnese Vini–Selle Italia
2013– 2020	No race		
2021	Belgium	Xandro Meurisse	Alpecin–Fenix
2022	Italy	Matteo Trentin	UAE Team Emirates
2023	France	Dorian Godon	AG2R Citroën Team
2024	New Zealand	Corbin Strong	Israel–Premier Tech
2025	Mexico	Isaac Del Toro	UAE Team Emirates XRG
2026	Italy	Alessandro Covi	Team Jayco–AlUla

== Wins per country ==
Wins	Country
80	Italy
2	Belgium
1	Spain; Switzerland; Denmark; Austria; France; New Zealand; Mexico
