= 2025 Giro dell'Emilia =

2025 UCI ProSeries

Race details
- Dates: 4 October 2025
- Stages: 1
- Distance: 199.2 km (123.8 mi)
- Winning time: 4h 46' 10"

Results
	Winner	Isaac del Toro (MEX)	(UAE Team Emirates XRG)
	Second	Tom Pidcock (GBR)	(Q36.5 Pro Cycling Team)
	Third	Lenny Martinez (FRA)	(Team Bahrain Victorious)

The 2025 Giro dell'Emilia was the 108th edition of the Giro dell'Emilia road cycling one day race, which was held on 4 October 2025 as part of the 2025 UCI ProSeries calendar.

== Teams ==
Fifteen UCI WorldTeams and seven UCI ProTeams made up the twenty-two teams that participated in the race.

UCI WorldTeams

- Cofidis
- Decathlon–AG2R La Mondiale
- EF Education–EasyPost
- Groupama–FDJ
- Ineos Grenadiers
- Lidl–Trek
- Movistar Team
- Red Bull–Bora–Hansgrohe
- Soudal–Quick-Step
- Team Bahrain Victorious
- Team Picnic–PostNL
- Team Jayco–AlUla
- UAE Team Emirates XRG
- Visma–Lease a Bike
- XDS Astana Team

UCI ProTeams

- Burgos Burpellet BH
- Q36.5 Pro Cycling Team
- Team Polti VisitMalta
- Tudor Pro Cycling Team
- Team Solution Tech–Vini Fantini
- Uno-X Mobility
- VF Group–Bardiani–CSF–Faizanè

== Results ==
Result
Rank	Rider	Team	Time
1	Isaac del Toro (MEX)	UAE Team Emirates XRG	4h 46' 10"
2	Tom Pidcock (GBR)	Q36.5 Pro Cycling Team	+ 1"
3	Lenny Martinez (FRA)	Team Bahrain Victorious	+ 5"
4	Egan Bernal (COL)	Ineos Grenadiers	+ 5"
5	Primož Roglič (SLO)	Red Bull–Bora–Hansgrohe	+ 5"
6	Ben Tulett (GBR)	Visma–Lease a Bike	+ 5"
7	Michael Storer (AUS)	Tudor Pro Cycling Team	+ 5"
8	Cian Uijtdebroeks (BEL)	Visma–Lease a Bike	+ 5"
9	Adam Yates (GBR)	UAE Team Emirates XRG	+ 21"
10	Albert Philipsen (DEN)	Lidl–Trek	+ 24"
