= 2025 GP Industria & Artigianato di Larciano =

- 2025 UCI ProSeries

Race details
- Dates: 7 September 2025
- Stages: 1
- Distance: 196.3 km (122.0 mi)
- Winning time: 4h 32' 47"

Results
	Winner	Isaac del Toro (MEX)	(UAE Team Emirates XRG)
	Second	Christian Scaroni (ITA)	(XDS Astana Team)
	Third	Davide Piganzoli (ITA)	(Team Polti VisitMalta)

The 2025 GP Industria & Artigianato di Larciano (transl. GP Industry & Handicraft of Larciano) was the 56th edition of the GP Industria & Artigianato di Larciano road cycling one-day race that was held on 7 September 2025. It was held as a 1.Pro event on the 2025 UCI ProSeries calendar.

== Teams ==
Seven UCI WorldTeams, Eleven UCI ProTeams and five UCI Continental teams made up the twenty-three teams that participated in the race.

UCI WorldTeams

- Cofidis
- EF Education–EasyPost
- Intermarché–Wanty
- Movistar Team
- Team Jayco–AlUla
- UAE Team Emirates XRG
- XDS Astana Team

UCI ProTeams

- Burgos Burpellet BH
- Caja Rural–Seguros RGA
- Equipo Kern Pharma
- Euskaltel–Euskadi
- Team Polti VisitMalta
- Tudor Pro Cycling Team
- Team Solution Tech–Vini Fantini
- Team TotalEnergies
- VF Group–Bardiani–CSF–Faizanè
- Unibet Tietema Rockets
- Uno-X Mobility

UCI Continental Teams

- Gragnano Sporting Club
- MBH Bank Ballan CSB
- MG.K Vis Costruzioni e Ambiente
- Petrolike
- Sam–Vitalcare–Dynatek

== Result ==
Result
Rank	Rider	Team	Time
1	Isaac del Toro (MEX)	UAE Team Emirates XRG	4h 32' 47"
2	Christian Scaroni (ITA)	XDS Astana Team	+ 0"
3	Davide Piganzoli (ITA)	Team Polti VisitMalta	+ 6"
4	Felix Engelhardt (GER)	Team Jayco–AlUla	+ 23"
5	Alexandre Delettre (FRA)	Team TotalEnergies	+ 23"
6	Louis Barré (FRA)	Intermarché–Wanty	+ 23"
7	Marc Hirschi (SUI)	Tudor Pro Cycling Team	+ 23"
8	Johannes Kulset (NOR)	Uno-X Mobility	+ 23"
9	Simone Velasco (ITA)	XDS Astana Team	+ 49"
10	Filippo Magli (ITA)	VF Group–Bardiani–CSF–Faizanè	+ 49"
