= 2025 Milano–Torino =

106th edition of the Milano–Torino cycling classic

- 2025 UCI ProSeries

Race details
- Dates: 19 March 2025
- Stages: 1
- Distance: 174 km (108.1 mi)
- Winning time: 3h 56' 49"

Results
	Winner	Isaac del Toro (MEX)	(UAE Team Emirates XRG)
	Second	Ben Tulett (GBR)	(Visma–Lease a Bike)
	Third	Tobias Halland Johannessen (NOR)	(Uno-X Mobility)

The 2025 Milano–Torino was the 106th edition of the Milano–Torino cycling classic. It was held on 19 March 2025 as a category 1.Pro race on the 2025 UCI ProSeries calendar.

== Teams ==
Seven of the 18 UCI WorldTeams, ten UCI ProTeams, and two UCI Continental teams made up the 19 teams that participated in the race.

UCI WorldTeams

- EF Education–EasyPost
- Intermarché–Wanty
- Movistar Team
- Team Picnic PostNL
- UAE Team Emirates XRG
- Visma–Lease a Bike
- XDS Astana Team

UCI ProTeams

- Equipo Kern Pharma
- Israel–Premier Tech
- Q36.5 Pro Cycling Team
- Team Polti VisitMalta
- Team Solution Tech–Vini Fantini
- Team TotalEnergies
- Tudor Pro Cycling Team
- Unibet Tietema Rockets
- Uno-X Mobility
- VF Group–Bardiani–CSF–Faizanè

UCI Continental Teams

- JCL Team Ukyo
- MBH Bank Ballan CSB

== Result ==
Result (1–10)
Rank	Rider	Team	Time
1	Isaac del Toro (MEX)	UAE Team Emirates XRG	3h 56' 49"
2	Ben Tulett (GBR)	Visma–Lease a Bike	+ 1"
3	Tobias Halland Johannessen (NOR)	Uno-X Mobility	+ 9"
4	Adam Yates (GBR)	UAE Team Emirates XRG	+ 24"
5	Einer Rubio (COL)	Movistar Team	+ 27"
6	Anders Halland Johannessen (NOR)	Uno-X Mobility	+ 34"
7	Jefferson Alexander Cepeda (ECU)	EF Education–EasyPost	+ 37"
8	Lorenzo Fortunato (ITA)	XDS Astana Team	+ 38"
9	Harold Martín López (ECU)	XDS Astana Team	+ 40"
10	Michael Storer (AUS)	Tudor Pro Cycling Team	+ 41"
