= 2025 Trofeo Laigueglia =

2025 UCI ProSeries

Race details
- Dates: 5 March 2025
- Stages: 1
- Distance: 197 km (122.4 mi)
- Winning time: 4h 46' 36"

Results
	Winner	Juan Ayuso (ESP)	(UAE Team Emirates XRG)
	Second	Christian Scaroni (ITA)	(XDS Astana Team)
	Third	Michael Storer (AUS)	(Tudor Pro Cycling Team)

The 2025 Trofeo Laigueglia was a one-day road cycling race that took place on 5 March 2025 in and around Laigueglia. It was the 62nd edition of the Trofeo Laigueglia and was rated as a 1.Pro event as part the 2025 UCI ProSeries.

== Teams ==
Twenty-five teams were invited to the race, consisting of eight UCI WorldTour teams, nine UCI ProTeams, and eight UCI Continental teams.

UCI WorldTeams

- Arkéa–B&B Hotels
- Cofidis
- EF Education–EasyPost
- Ineos Grenadiers
- Intermarché–Wanty
- Team Jayco–AlUla
- UAE Team Emirates XRG
- XDS Astana Team

UCI ProTeams

- Caja Rural–Seguros RGA
- Q36.5 Pro Cycling Team
- Team Polti VisitMalta
- Team TotalEnergies
- Team Solution Tech–Vini Fantini
- Tudor Pro Cycling Team
- Unibet Tietema Rockets
- VF Group–Bardiani–CSF–Faizanè
- Wagner Bazin WB

UCI Continental teams

- Biesse–Carrera–Premac
- General Store–Essegibi–Fratelli Curia
- JCL Team Ukyo
- MBH Bank Ballan CSB
- MG.K Vis Costruzioni e Ambiente
- Petrolike
- Sam–Vitalcare–Dynatek
- S.C. Padovani Polo Cherry Bank

== Result ==
Result
Rank	Rider	Team	Time
1	Juan Ayuso (ESP)	UAE Team Emirates XRG	4h 46' 36"
2	Christian Scaroni (ITA)	XDS Astana Team	+ 0"
3	Michael Storer (AUS)	Tudor Pro Cycling Team	+ 0"
4	Neilson Powless (USA)	EF Education–EasyPost	+ 0"
5	Giovanni Carboni (ITA)	Unibet Tietema Rockets	+ 3"
6	Magnus Sheffield (USA)	Ineos Grenadiers	+ 13"
7	Alberto Bettiol (ITA)	XDS Astana Team	+ 23"
8	Louis Barré (FRA)	Intermarché–Wanty	+ 23"
9	Mattéo Vercher (FRA)	Team TotalEnergies	+ 23"
10	Simone Gualdi (ITA)	Intermarché–Wanty	+ 23"
