= Louis Barré =

French cyclist (born 2000)

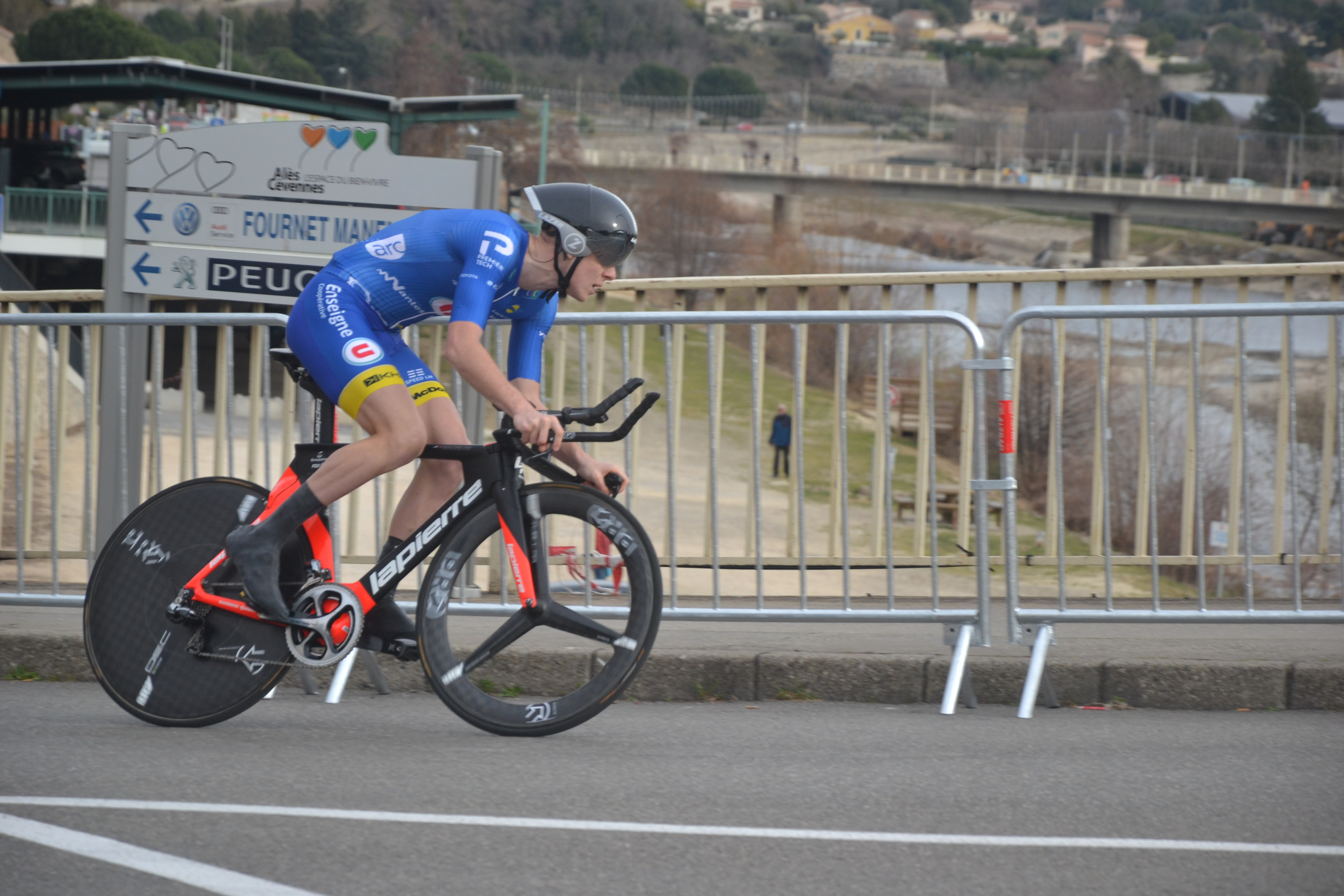
- Barré at the 2022 Étoile de Bessèges

Personal information
- Born: 6 April 2000 (age 26) Nantes, France
- Height: 1.84 m (6 ft 0 in)
- Weight: 68 kg (150 lb)

Cycling career
- Sport: Cycling
- Current team: Visma–Lease a Bike
- Discipline: Road
- Role: Rider

Amateur teams
- 2017–2018: UC Nantes Atlantique Junior
- 2019–2021: Team UC Nantes Atlantique

Professional teams
- 2022: Team UC Nantes Atlantique
- 2022–2024: Arkéa–Samsic
- 2025: Intermarché–Wanty
- 2026–: Visma–Lease a Bike

Louis Barré (born 6 April 2000) is a French cyclist, who currently rides for UCI WorldTeam Visma–Lease a Bike.

== Major results ==
2017
1st Mountains classification, Ronde des Vallées
8th Bernaudeau Junior
9th Overall Tour du Pays de Vaud
2018
3rd Road race, National Junior Road Championships
4th Gent–Wevelgem Juniors
7th Overall Ronde des Vallées
8th Bernaudeau Junior
2019
10th Overall Ronde de l'Oise
2021
2nd Overall L'Estivale Bretonne

1st Stage 2

4th Liège–Bastogne–Liège Espoirs
7th Road race, UEC European Under-23 Road Championships
2022
7th Tour du Finistère
9th Overall Boucles de la Mayenne
2023
3rd Route Adélie de Vitré
6th Overall Tour of Guangxi
8th Trofeo Andratx–Mirador D'es Colomer
8th Tour du Finistère
10th Paris–Camembert
2024
6th Giro dell'Appennino
7th Trofeo Laigueglia
8th Overall Tour du Limousin
10th Cadel Evans Great Ocean Road Race
2025
3rd Paris–Camembert
6th Amstel Gold Race
6th Grand Prix Cycliste de Montréal
6th GP Industria & Artigianato di Larciano
6th Classic Var
8th Trofeo Laigueglia
10th Overall Tour des Alpes-Maritimes
2026 (2 pro wins)
2nd Overall Deutschland Tour

1st Stage 1

3rd Overall Tour of Guangxi
4th Overall Tour de Pologne

1st Stage 6

=== Grand Tour general classification results timeline ===
Grand Tour	2024	2025
Giro d'Italia	DNF	—
Tour de France	—	82
Vuelta a España	—	—

Legend
—	Did not compete
DNF	Did not finish
