= 2025 Gran Piemonte =

2025 UCI ProSeries

Race details
- Dates: 9 October 2025
- Stages: 1
- Distance: 179 km (111.2 mi)
- Winning time: 4h 08' 24"

Results
	Winner	Isaac del Toro (MEX)	(UAE Team Emirates XRG)
	Second	Marc Hirschi (SUI)	(Tudor Pro Cycling Team)
	Third	Bauke Mollema (NED)	(Lidl–Trek)

The 2025 Gran Piemonte was the 109th edition of the Gran Piemonte road cycling one day race, which was held on 9 October 2025 as part of the 2025 UCI ProSeries calendar.

== Teams ==
13 UCI WorldTeams and seven UCI ProTeams made up the 20 teams that participated in the race.

UCI WorldTeams

- EF Education–EasyPost
- Alpecin–Deceuninck
- Team Bahrain Victorious
- Cofidis
- Ineos Grenadiers
- Intermarché–Wanty
- Lidl–Trek
- Movistar Team
- Red Bull–Bora–Hansgrohe
- Team Jayco–AlUla
- Team Picnic–PostNL
- UAE Team Emirates XRG
- XDS Astana Team

UCI ProTeams

- Q36.5 Pro Cycling Team
- Team Solution Tech–Vini Fantini
- Team Polti VisitMalta
- Tudor Pro Cycling Team
- Unibet Tietema Rockets
- Uno-X Mobility
- VF Group–Bardiani–CSF–Faizanè

== Results ==
Result
Rank	Rider	Team	Time
1	Isaac del Toro (MEX)	UAE Team Emirates XRG	4h 08' 24"
2	Marc Hirschi (SUI)	Tudor Pro Cycling Team	+ 40"
3	Bauke Mollema (NED)	Lidl–Trek	+ 44"
4	Fabio Christen (SUI)	Q36.5 Pro Cycling Team	+ 01' 07"
5	Michael Matthews (AUS)	Team Jayco–AlUla	+ 01' 07"
6	Edoardo Zambanini (ITA)	Team Bahrain Victorious	+ 01' 07"
7	Neilson Powless (USA)	EF Education–EasyPost	+ 01' 07"
8	Quinten Hermans (BEL)	Alpecin–Deceuninck	+ 01' 07"
9	Egan Bernal (COL)	Ineos Grenadiers	+ 01' 07"
10	Andrea Bagioli (ITA)	Lidl–Trek	+ 01' 07"
