= Valmeinier =

- Commune
- Location of Valmeinier
- Location within France Location within Auvergne-Rhône-Alpes
- Coordinates: 45°11′05″N 6°28′55″E
- Country: France
- Region: Auvergne-Rhône-Alpes
- Department: Savoie
- Arrondissement: Saint-Jean-de-Maurienne
- Canton: Modane
- Intercommunality: Maurienne-Galibier

Government
  - Mayor (2020–2026): Alexandre Albrieux
- Area^{1}: 54.26 km^{2} (20.95 sq mi)
- Highest elevation: 3,160 m (10,370 ft)
- Lowest elevation: 1,200 m (3,900 ft)
- Population (2023): 593
  - Density: 10.9/km^{2} (28.3/sq mi)
- Time zone: UTC+01:00 (CET)
  - Summer (DST): UTC+02:00 (CEST)
- INSEE/Postal code: 73307 /73450
- Website: Valmeinier.com
- ^{1} French Land Register data, which excludes lakes, ponds, glaciers > 1 km^{2} (0.386 sq mi or 247 acres) and river estuaries.

Valmeinier
- Interactive map of Valmeinier
- Location: Savoie, France
- Nearest city: St Jean de Maurienne, France
- Coordinates: 45°10′27″N 6°29′33″E
- Top elevation: 2,600 meters (8,500 ft)
- Base elevation: 1,500 meters (4,900 ft)
- Skiable area: 150 km
- Trails: 83 total 21 beginner 25 intermediate 37 advanced/expert
- Longest run: "Combe Orsière" - 5 km
- Lift system: 34 total (2 Gondola, 18 chairlifts, 14 lifts)
- Terrain parks: 3
- Website: Valmeinier.com

Valmeinier (French pronunciation: [valmɛnje]; Arpitan: Vàrmêniél) is a commune in the Savoie department in the Auvergne-Rhône-Alpes region in south-eastern France.

Valmeinier, located at the foot of the Mont Thabor, 3207 meters, is a medium size ski resort (about 10,000 beds). The first ski lift was built in 1973, at L'Arméra, connecting to the Valloire ski area. The village at 1,500 m started to develop with the arrival of various holiday villages (Renouveau and LVT Chemins).

In 1986, the resort at 1800 m was launched and the Gros Crey ski area equipped with lifts.

== Ski area information ==
The ski area shared by the resorts of Valmeinier and Valloire has a new name: "Galibier– Thabor". This refers to the area's 2 emblematic summits, which peak at more than 3,000 metres. The first ski lift was installed in 1973, in L'Armera, in order to join up with Valloire, which had already been operating for a few years. Gradually, the ski area expanded and it now features 150 km of slopes over 1,600 hectares. The snowpark, classified as 5th French snowpark and 15th European, is certified by the French Snowboard Association (AFS). It is tended daily by the resort's staff.

== History ==
Settled in the 12th century, Valmeinier was practically self-sufficient with most of its inhabitants living off the land until the 17th century. At this time they discovered a high quality anthracite which they decided to mine, hence Valmeinier got its name ("Val des mines" translates as the valley of the mines). Between 1848 and 1924, bolstered by the industrialisation of the Maurienne Valley, agriculture and mining developed as the two main economic activities. Cereals (corn, wheat and rye) were grown up to 1,500 metres. During the winter season, some farmers worked as chimney-sweeps, operating in pairs, mainly in the Paris area and in Brittany. The end of the 1960s saw the end of traditional farming and also a massive exodus from the valley, by the end of the 1970s there were fewer than 80 permanent inhabitants in Valmeinier.

== March 2009 Avalanche ==
Four people were killed in an avalanche on 11 March 2009. As many as eight skiers were caught in the snowslide. They were reported to be a group of students, accompanied by a guide.

== See also ==
- Communes of the Savoie department
