= Isaac del Toro =

Mexican cyclist (born 2003)

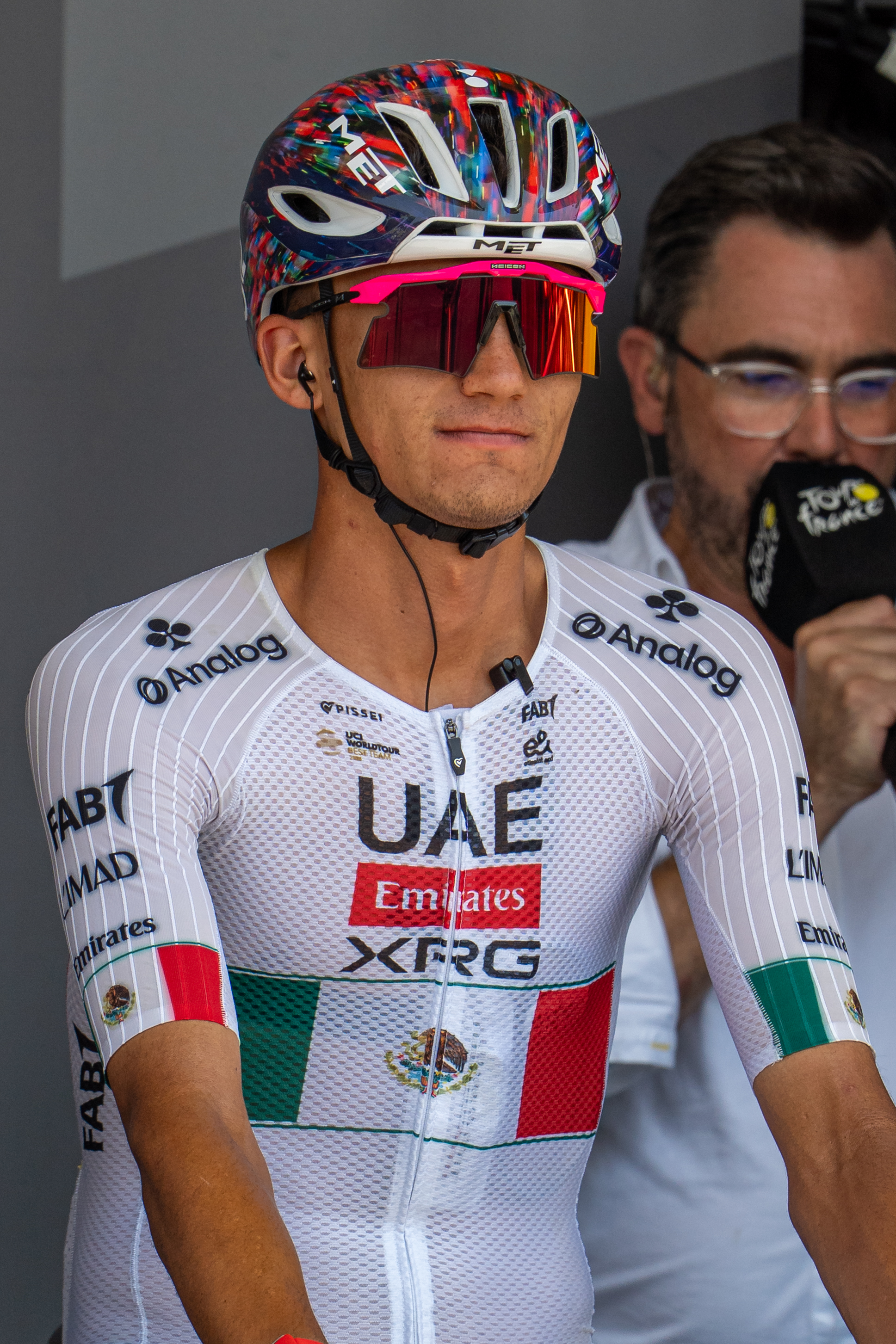
- Del Toro at the 2026 Tour de France

Personal information
- Full name: Isaac del Toro Romero
- Nickname: El Torito
- Born: 27 November 2003 (age 22) Ensenada, Baja California, Mexico
- Height: 1.80 m (5 ft 11 in)
- Weight: 64 kg (141 lb; 10 st 1 lb)

Cycling career
- Sport: Cycling
- Current team: UAE Team Emirates XRG
- Discipline: Road
- Role: Rider
- Rider type: All-rounder; Climber

Amateur teams
- 2021: A.R. Monex Pro Cycling Team U19
- 2022–2023: A.R. Monex Pro Cycling Team

Professional team
- 2024–: UAE Team Emirates

Major wins
- Grand Tours Tour de France Young rider classification (2026) 1 individual stage (2026) Giro d'Italia Young rider classification (2025) 1 individual stage (2025) Stage races Tirreno–Adriatico (2026) Tour Auvergne-Rhône-Alpes (2026) UAE Tour (2026) Deutschland Tour (2026) Vuelta a Burgos (2025) One-day races and Classics National Road Race Championships (2025) National Time Trial Championships (2025) GP de Montréal (2026) Milano–Torino (2025) Coppa Sabatini (2025) GP Industria & Artigianato (2025) Giro dell'Emilia (2025) Gran Piemonte (2025) Giro del Veneto (2025)

Isaac del Toro Romero (born 27 November 2003) is a Mexican professional cyclist who rides for UCI WorldTeam UAE Team Emirates XRG. A climber and general classification contender, he has also achieved notable results in hilly one-day races.

He rose to international prominence after winning the Tour de l'Avenir in 2023, becoming the first Mexican rider to win the race. At the 2025 Giro d'Italia he finished second overall, won stage 17 and the young rider classification, becoming the first North American rider to win the latter. The following season he claimed his first UCI WorldTour general classification victories at the UAE Tour, Tirreno–Adriatico and Tour Auvergne-Rhône-Alpes.

Del Toro made his Tour de France debut in 2026, winning stage 2 to become only the second Mexican rider to win a Tour stage. He went on to finish third overall, the first Mexican to reach the final podium, and won the young rider classification.

== Amateur career ==
Del Toro was born in Ensenada, Baja California, Mexico. He began cycling at a young age and initially competed across several disciplines, including mountain biking, cyclo-cross and road racing.

As a teenager he joined the Mexican development squad A.R. Monex Pro Cycling Team. He has cited Egan Bernal's victory at the 2019 Tour de France as a major inspiration for pursuing a professional cycling career.

Although Del Toro had shown strong performances during his amateur career, he had struggled to convert them into victories. During this period, UAE Team Emirates sports manager Joxean Fernández Matxín had been in contact with him and was helping him secure a developmental contract with Caja Rural–Seguros RGA so he could begin racing professionally in Europe.

In 2022, Del Toro had a serious accident while training in San Marino, breaking his femur and severing an artery. He suffered severe hemorrhaging and had to be airlifted out. He spent 16 days in the hospital and had screws and a metal bar inserted in his leg to regenerate the femur.

Del Toro rose to international prominence in 2023 when he won the Tour de l'Avenir, widely regarded as the most important stage race for under-23 riders and a traditional showcase for future professional stars. His victory made him the first Mexican rider to win the race and established him as one of the most promising young climbers in the sport. In a later interview with GCN en Español, he said that he had viewed the race as his "last bullet" to prove himself.

After his victory at the Tour de l'Avenir, UAE Team Emirates decided that he was ready to move directly to the WorldTour rather than follow the original developmental path. In October 2023 the team announced that Del Toro would join the squad on a three-year contract starting in 2024.

== Professional career ==
=== 2024: Professional debut ===
Del Toro made his professional debut in January 2024 at the Down Under Classic, finishing on the podium.

Four days later he claimed his first UCI WorldTour stage victory by winning stage 2 of the 2024 Tour Down Under. Although not starting the race as the team's designated leader, UAE Team Emirates gave the young Mexican rider the freedom to race for the stage. Del Toro attacked on the final climb with around 1 km remaining and held off the favourites to take a solo victory. The victory was widely regarded as a major milestone for Mexican cycling, marking the end of a 22-year drought for the country at the WorldTour level of the sport.

=== 2025: Giro breakthrough ===
At the 2025 Giro d'Italia, Del Toro began the race in a support role within a UAE Team Emirates-XRG squad led by Juan Ayuso and Adam Yates. On stage 9, over the race's gravel roads to Siena, he finished second to Wout van Aert and moved into the overall lead, becoming the first Mexican rider to wear the maglia rosa.

As Ayuso's challenge faded and he later abandoned the race, Del Toro emerged as UAE Team Emirates-XRG's main general classification contender. He won stage 17 with a late attack, secured the young rider classification, and finished second overall. Del Toro became the first North American rider to win the Giro's young rider classification. The loss of his race leadership on the Colle delle Finestre sparked intense scrutiny regarding the tactics used during the battle between Del Toro, Richard Carapaz, and the eventual winner, Simon Yates.

In 2025, he also enjoyed a successful campaign in the Italian classics, winning Milano–Torino, the Giro dell'Emilia, the Giro del Veneto, and Gran Piemonte, while also finishing fifth at Il Lombardia.

=== 2026: First WorldTour and GrandTour stage race wins ===
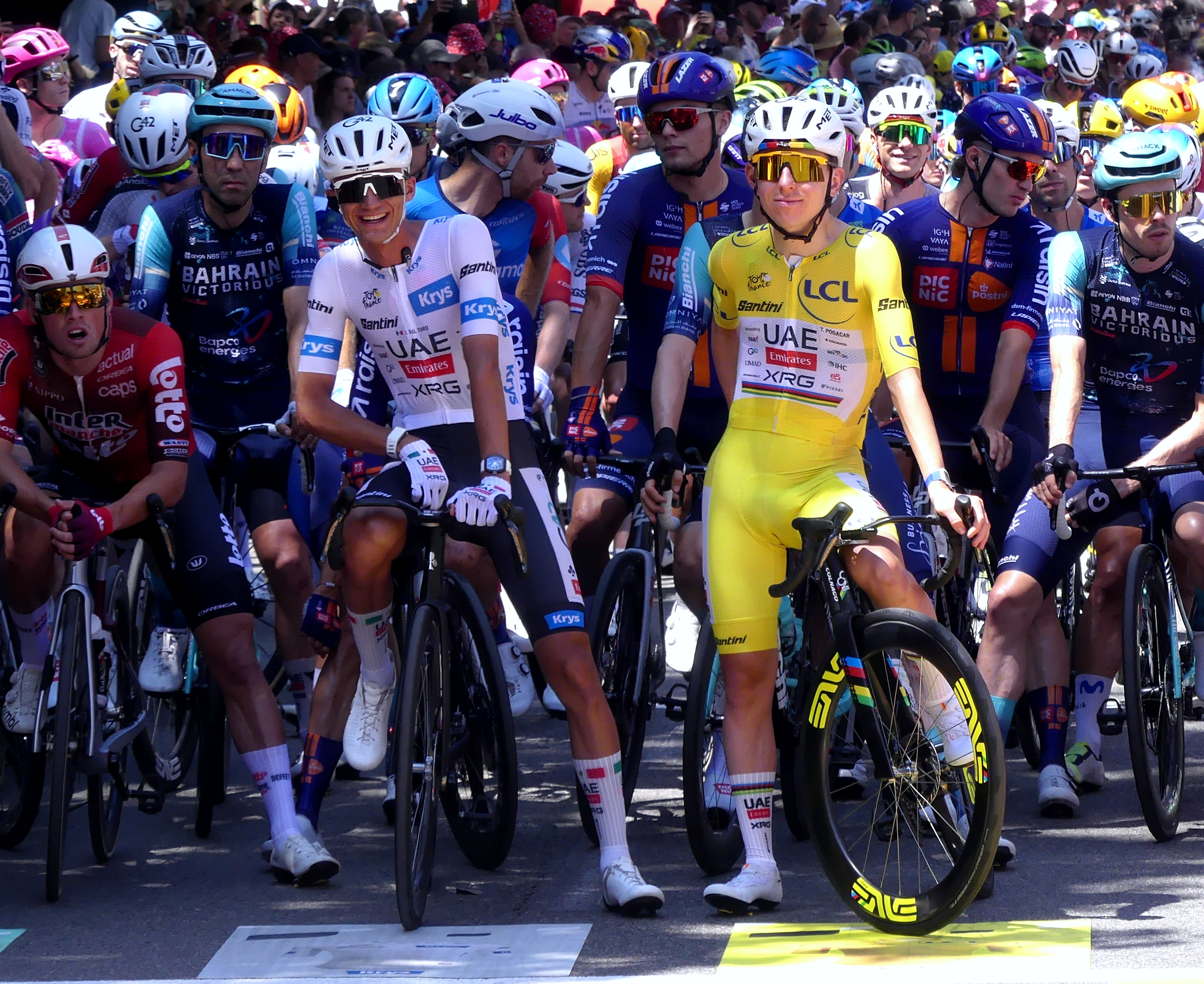
UAE Team Emirates XRG teammates Isaac del Toro (in the white jersey) and Tadej Pogačar (in the yellow jersey) prior to the start of stage 17 in Chambéry in 2026 Tour de France.

At the 2026 UAE Tour, UAE Team Emirates-XRG announced Del Toro alongside Adam Yates as one of the team's leaders for the race, marking the first time he had been publicly designated as a team leader for a UCI WorldTour event. He won stage 1 and later secured the overall title with victory on stage 6, claiming his first UCI WorldTour general classification win.

At the 2026 Tirreno–Adriatico, Del Toro won stage 6 to extend his lead before sealing the general classification victory the following day, becoming the first North American rider to win the race.

At the 2026 Tour Auvergne-Rhône-Alpes, the first edition of the race under its new name after being rebranded from the Critérium du Dauphiné, Del Toro won stage 7 on the Grand Colombier and stage 8 at the Plateau de Solaison, overturning the general classification on the final day to win the race overall.

Del Toro won Stage 2 at the 2026 Tour de France, his first appearance at the French Grand Tour, becoming the second Mexican rider to win a stage at the race after Raúl Alcalá, and took the lead in the young rider classification. He finished third overall behind his teammate Tadej Pogačar and Remco Evenepoel and also claimed the overall young rider classification, edging out Paul Seixas by two minutes and fourteen seconds. On 8 November 2026, Del Toro won the Tour de France EFGH Singapore Criterium to round out his season.

Wearing the Pink Jersey in the 2025 Giro d'Italia, Isaac del Toro (UAE Team Emirates XRG)

== Major results ==
2023
1st Overall Tour de l'Avenir

1st Points classification
1st Mountains classification
1st Young rider classification
1st Stage 6

3rd Overall Giro della Valle d'Aosta
4th Trofeo Alcide Degasperi
2024 (3 pro wins)
1st Overall Vuelta a Asturias

1st Points classification
1st Stage 1

3rd Overall Tour Down Under

1st Young rider classification
1st Stage 2

3rd Down Under Classic
4th Overall Tirreno–Adriatico
6th Road race, UCI Road World Under-23 Championships
7th Overall Tour of the Basque Country
Combativity award Stage 19 Vuelta a España
2025 (18)
National Road Championships

1st Road race
1st Time trial

1st Overall Vuelta a Burgos

1st Young rider classification

1st Overall Tour of Austria

1st Points classification
1st Young rider classification
1st Stages 2, 3 & 4

1st Milano–Torino
1st Coppa Sabatini
1st GP Industria & Artigianato di Larciano
1st Giro dell'Emilia
1st Gran Piemonte
1st Giro del Veneto
1st Clásica Terres de l'Ebre
1st Circuito de Getxo
1st Giro della Toscana
1st Trofeo Matteotti
1st Young rider classification, Tour of the Basque Country
2nd Overall Giro d'Italia

1st Young rider classification
1st Stage 17
Held after Stages 9–19

2nd Clásica Jaén Paraíso Interior
2nd Prueba Villafranca de Ordizia
UCI Road World Championships

5th Time trial
7th Road race

5th Giro di Lombardia
5th Clásica de San Sebastián
2026 (11)
1st Overall Tour Auvergne-Rhône-Alpes

1st Young rider classification
1st Stages 7 & 8

1st Overall Tirreno–Adriatico

1st Points classification
1st Young rider classification
1st Stage 6

1st Overall UAE Tour

1st Young rider classification
1st Stages 1 & 6

1st Overall Deutschland Tour

1st Points classification
1st Young rider classification
1st Prologue

1st Grand Prix Cycliste de Montréal
3rd Overall Tour de France

1st Young rider classification
1st Stage 2
Held after Stage 2

3rd Strade Bianche
UCI Road World Championships

5th Road race
6th Time trial

1st Tour de France EFGH Singapore Criterium

=== General classification results timeline ===
Grand Tour general classification results
| Grand Tour | 2024 | 2025 | 2026 |
| Giro d'Italia | — | 2 | — |
| Tour de France | — | — | 3 |
| Vuelta a España | 36 | — | — |
Major stage race general classification results
| Race | 2024 | 2025 | 2026 |
| Paris–Nice | — | — | — |
| Tirreno–Adriatico | 4 | 19 | 1 |
| Volta a Catalunya | — | — | — |
| Tour of the Basque Country | 7 | 15 | DNF |
| Tour de Romandie | — | — | — |
| Critérium du Dauphiné | — | — | 1 |
| Tour de Suisse | 13 | — | — |

=== Classics results timeline ===
| Monument | 2024 | 2025 | 2026 |
|---|---|---|---|
| Milan–San Remo | 73 | 13 | 110 |
| Tour of Flanders | — | — | — |
| Paris–Roubaix | — | — | — |
| Liège–Bastogne–Liège | — | — | — |
| Giro di Lombardia | — | 5 | |
| Classic | 2024 | 2025 | 2026 |
| Strade Bianche | DNF | 33 | 3 |
| Clásica de San Sebastián | 49 | 5 | — |
| Hamburg Cyclassics | — | 42 | 43 |
| Bretagne Classic | — | 58 | — |
| Grand Prix Cycliste de Québec | — | — | 55 |
| Grand Prix Cycliste de Montréal | — | — | 1 |

Legend
| — | Did not compete |
| DNF | Did not finish |
