= 2025 Team Jayco–AlUla (men's team) season =

Team Jayco–AlUla
- 2025 season
- UCI code: JAY
- Status: UCI WorldTeam
- Owner: Gerry Ryan
- Manager: Brent Copeland (RSA)
- Main sponsor(s): Jayco; City of Al-'Ula
- Based: Australia
- Bicycles: Giant
- Groupset: Shimano

Season victories
- One-day races: 2
- Stage race stages: 7
- National Championships: 5
- Most wins: (Netherlands) Dylan Groenewegen (Australia) Luke Plapp (Switzerland) Mauro Schmid (3 wins each)

The 2025 season for the Team Jayco–AlUla team is the team's 14th season in existence, all of which have been as a UCI WorldTeam.

== Team roster ==
As of 7 January 2025.

| Rider | Date of birth |
|---|---|
| Welay Berhe (ETH) | 22 October 2001 (aged 23) |
| Koen Bouwman (NED) | 2 December 1993 (aged 31) |
| Alessandro De Marchi (ITA) | 19 May 1986 (aged 38) |
| Davide De Pretto (ITA) | 19 April 2002 (aged 22) |
| Bob Donaldson (GBR) | 8 April 2002 (aged 22) |
| Paul Double (GBR) | 25 June 1996 (aged 28) |
| Eddie Dunbar (IRE) | 1 September 1996 (aged 28) |
| Luke Durbridge (AUS) | 9 April 1991 (aged 33) |
| Felix Engelhardt (GER) | 19 August 2000 (aged 24) |
| Caleb Ewan (AUS) | 11 July 1994 (aged 30) |
| Anders Foldager (DEN) | 27 July 2001 (aged 23) |
| Patrick Gamper (AUT) | 18 February 1997 (aged 27) |
| Dylan Groenewegen (NED) | 21 June 1993 (aged 31) |
| Chris Harper (AUS) | 23 November 1994 (aged 30) |
| Alan Hatherly (RSA) | 15 March 1996 (aged 28) |

| Rider | Date of birth |
|---|---|
| Asbjørn Hellemose (DEN) | 15 January 1999 (aged 25) |
| Michael Hepburn (AUS) | 17 August 1991 (aged 33) |
| Christopher Juul-Jensen (DEN) | 6 July 1989 (aged 35) |
| Jelte Krijnsen (NED) | 12 May 2001 (aged 23) |
| Michael Matthews (AUS) | 26 September 1990 (aged 34) |
| Luka Mezgec (SLO) | 27 June 1988 (aged 36) |
| Kelland O'Brien (AUS) | 22 May 1998 (aged 26) |
| Ben O'Connor (AUS) | 25 November 1995 (aged 29) |
| Luke Plapp (AUS) | 25 December 2000 (aged 24) |
| Elmar Reinders (NED) | 14 March 1992 (aged 32) |
| Mauro Schmid (SUI) | 4 December 1999 (aged 25) |
| Campbell Stewart (NZL) | 12 May 1998 (aged 26) |
| Jasha Sütterlin (GER) | 4 November 1992 (aged 32) |
| Max Walscheid (GER) | 13 June 1993 (aged 31) |
| Filippo Zana (ITA) | 18 March 1999 (aged 25) |

Riders who joined the team for the 2025 season

| Rider | 2024 team |
|---|---|
| Koen Bouwman | Visma–Lease a Bike |
| Bob Donaldson | neo-pro (Trinity Racing) |
| Paul Double | Polti–Kometa |
| Patrick Gamper | Bora–Hansgrohe |
| Alan Hatherly | Cannondale Factory Racing |
| Asbjørn Hellemose | Swatt Club |
| Jelte Krijnsen | neo-pro (Parkhotel Valkenburg) |
| Ben O'Connor | Decathlon–AG2R La Mondiale |
| Jasha Sütterlin | Team Bahrain Victorious |

Riders who left the team during or after the 2024 season

| Rider | 2025 team |
|---|---|
| Lawson Craddock | Retired |
| Caleb Ewan | Ineos Grenadiers |
| Lucas Hamilton | Ineos Grenadiers |
| Amund Grøndahl Jansen | Uno-X Mobility |
| Jan Maas | Cofidis |
| Jesús David Peña | AP Hotels & Resorts / Tavira / SC Farense |
| Rudy Porter | No team |
| Blake Quick | Roojai Insurance |
| Callum Scotson | Decathlon–AG2R La Mondiale |
| Simon Yates | Visma–Lease a Bike |

== Season victories ==
| Date | Race | Competition | Rider | Country | Location | Ref. |
|---|---|---|---|---|---|---|
| 2 February | Cadel Evans Great Ocean Road Race | UCI World Tour | Mauro Schmid (SWI) | Australia | Geelong | |
| 26 March | Settimana Internazionale di Coppi e Bartali, stage 2 | UCI Europe Tour | Paul Double (GBR) | Italy | Sogliano al Rubicone | |
| 3 April | Tour of Greece, stage 2 | UCI Europe Tour | Luke Plapp (AUS) | Greece | Arachova | |
| 1 May | Eschborn–Frankfurt | UCI World Tour | Michael Matthews (AUS) | Germany | Frankfurt | |
| 17 May | Tour de Hongrie, stage 4 | UCI ProSeries | Dylan Groenewegen (NED) | Hungary | Székesfehérvár | |
| 17 May | Giro d'Italia, stage 8 | UCI World Tour | Luke Plapp (AUS) | Italy | Castelraimondo | |
| 31 May | Giro d'Italia, stage 20 | UCI World Tour | Chris Harper (AUS) | Italy | Sestriere | |
| 4 June | Tour of Slovenia, stage 1 | UCI ProSeries | Dylan Groenewegen (NED) | Slovenia | Škofljica | |
| 6 June | Tour of Slovenia, stage 3 | UCI ProSeries | Dylan Groenewegen (NED) | Slovenia | Ormož | |
| 24 July | Tour de France, stage 18 | UCI World Tour | Ben O'Connor (AUS) | France | Courchevel | |
| 21 September | Tour of Slovakia, stage 5 | UCI Europe Tour | Paul Double (GBR) | Slovakia | Kohútka | |
| 21 September | Tour of Slovakia, Overall | UCI Europe Tour | Paul Double (GBR) | Slovakia | | |
| 18 October | Tour of Guangxi, stage 5 | UCI World Tour | Paul Double (GBR) | China | Nongla | |

== National, Continental, and World Champions ==
| Date | Discipline | Jersey | Rider | Country | Location | Ref. |
|---|---|---|---|---|---|---|
| 9 January | Australian National Time Trial Championships | | Luke Plapp (AUS) | Australia | Perth | |
| 12 January | Australian National Road Race Championships | | Luke Durbridge (AUS) | Australia | Perth | |
| 7 February | South African National Time Trial Championships | | Alan Hatherly (RSA) | South Africa | Midvaal | |
| 26 June | Swiss National Time Trial Championships | | Mauro Schmid (SUI) | Switzerland | Steinmaur | |
| 29 June | Swiss National Road Race Championships | | Mauro Schmid (SUI) | Switzerland | Fischingen | |
