= 2025 Ineos Grenadiers season =

INEOS Grenadiers
- 2025 season
- UCI code: IGD
- Status: UCI WorldTeam
- Manager: John Maxwell Allert (GBR)
- Main sponsor(s): Ineos
- Based: United Kingdom
- Bicycles: Pinarello
- Groupset: Shimano

Season victories
- One-day races: 1
- Stage race overall: 1
- Stage race stages: 14
- National Championships: 8
- Most wins: (United Kingdom) Samuel Watson (4)

The 2025 season for the INEOS Grenadiers is the 16th season in the team's existence, all of which have been as a UCI WorldTeam. This is the 7th season with Ineos as the title sponsor and the 6th full season with the current name.

== Team roster ==
All ages are as of 1 January 2025, the first day of the 2025 season.

As of 4 January 2025.

Rider	Date of birth
Thymen Arensman (NED)	4 December 1999 (aged 25)
Andrew August (USA)	12 October 2005 (aged 19)
Egan Bernal (COL)	13 January 1997 (aged 27)
Jonathan Castroviejo (ESP)	27 April 1987 (aged 37)
Laurens De Plus (BEL)	4 September 1995 (aged 29)
Caleb Ewan (AUS)	11 July 1994 (aged 30)
Tobias Foss (NOR)	25 May 1997 (aged 27)
Omar Fraile (ESP)	17 July 1990 (aged 34)
Filippo Ganna (ITA)	25 July 1996 (aged 28)
Lucas Hamilton (AUS)	12 February 1996 (aged 28)
Kim Heiduk (GER)	3 March 2000 (aged 24)
Bob Jungels (LUX)	22 September 1992 (aged 32)
Michał Kwiatkowski (POL)	2 June 1990 (aged 34)
Victor Langellotti (MON)	7 June 1995 (aged 29)

Rider	Date of birth
Axel Laurance (FRA)	13 April 2001 (aged 23)
Michael Leonard (CAN)	26 March 2004 (aged 20)
Salvatore Puccio (ITA)	31 August 1989 (aged 35)
Brandon Rivera (COL)	21 March 1996 (aged 28)
Carlos Rodriguez (ESP)	2 February 2001 (aged 23)
Óscar Rodríguez (ESP)	6 May 1995 (aged 29)
Magnus Sheffield (USA)	19 April 2002 (aged 22)
Artem Shmidt (USA)	30 January 2004 (aged 20)
Ben Swift (GBR)	5 November 1987 (aged 37)
Connor Swift (GBR)	30 October 1995 (aged 29)
Joshua Tarling (GBR)	15 February 2004 (aged 20)
Geraint Thomas (GBR)	25 May 1986 (aged 38)
Ben Turner (GBR)	28 May 1999 (aged 25)
Samuel Watson (GBR)	24 September 2001 (aged 23)

== Season victories ==
Date	Race	Competition	Rider	Country	Location	Ref.
17 February	Clásica Jaén Paraíso Interior	UCI Europe Tour	Michał Kwiatkowski (POL)	Spain	Úbeda	
18 February	UAE Tour, stage 2 (ITT)	UCI World Tour	Josh Tarling (GBR)	United Arab Emirates	Al Hudayriat Island	
10 March	Tirreno–Adriatico, stage 1 (ITT)	UCI World Tour	Filippo Ganna (ITA)	Italy	Camaiore	
16 March	Paris–Nice, stage 8	UCI World Tour	Magnus Sheffield (USA)	France	Nice	
25 March	Settimana Internazionale di Coppi e Bartali, stage 1	UCI Europe Tour	Caleb Ewan (AUS)	Italy	Bondeno	
8 April	Tour of the Basque Country, stage 2	UCI World Tour	Caleb Ewan (AUS)	Spain	Lodosa	
24 April	Tour of the Alps, stage 4	UCI World Tour	Thymen Arensman (NED)	Austria	Obertilliach	
29 April	Tour de Romandie, prologue	UCI World Tour	Samuel Watson (GBR)	Switzerland	Saint-Imier	
10 May	Giro d'Italia, stage 2 (ITT)	UCI World Tour	Josh Tarling (GBR)	Albania	Tirana	
17 May	Four Days of Dunkirk, stage 4	UCI ProSeries	Samuel Watson (GBR)	France	Cassel	
18 May	Four Days of Dunkirk, overall	UCI ProSeries	Samuel Watson (GBR)	France		
13 July	Tour of Austria, stage 5	UCI Europe Tour	Bob Jungels (LUX)	Austria	Feldkirch	
19 July	Tour de France, stage 14	UCI World Tour	Thymen Arensman (NED)	France	Superbagnères	
25 July	Tour de France, stage 19	UCI World Tour	Thymen Arensman (NED)	France	La Plagne	
6 August	Tour de Pologne, stage 3	UCI World Tour	Ben Turner (GBR)	Poland	Wałbrzych	
9 August	Tour de Pologne, stage 6	UCI World Tour	Victor Langellotti (MON)	Poland	Bukowina Tatrzańska	

== National, Continental, and World Champions ==
Date	Discipline	Jersey	Rider	Country	Location	Ref.
6 February	Colombian National Time Trial Championships		Egan Bernal (COL)	Colombia	Bucaramanga	
9 February	Colombian National Road Race Championships		Egan Bernal (COL)	Colombia	Bucaramanga	
21 May	United States National Time Trial Championships		Artem Shmidt (USA)	United States	Charleston	
26 June	Italian National Time Trial Championships		Filippo Ganna (ITA)	Italy	San Vito al Tagliamento	
26 June	Norwegian National Time Trial Championships		Tobias Foss (NOR)	Norway	Lileeng	
26 June	Luxembourg National Time Trial Championships		Bob Jungels (LUX)	Luxembourg	Mertzig	
27 June	Canadian National Time Trial Championships		Michael Leonard (CAN)	Canada	Saint-Georges	
29 June	British National Road Race Championships		Samuel Watson (GBR)	United Kingdom	Aberystwyth	
