= Commissaire (cycling) =

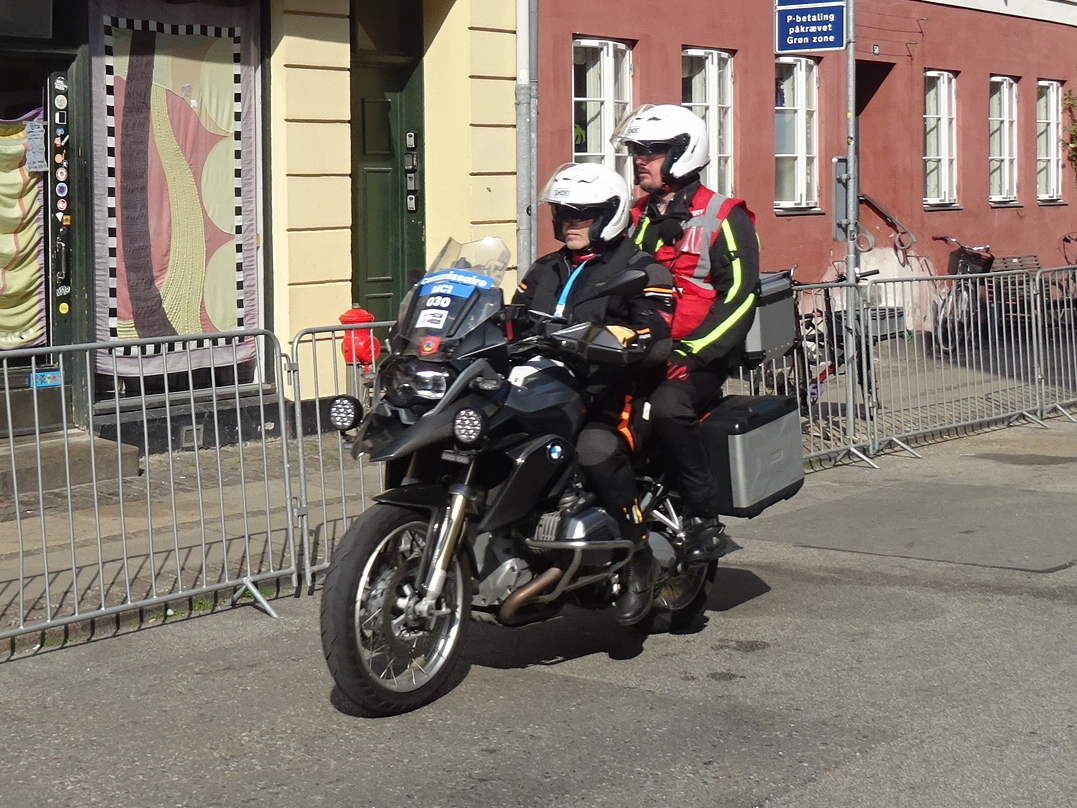
Commissaire at the 2025 Copenhagen Sprint (women's race).

In competitive cycling, a commissaire is an official approximately equivalent to an umpire or referee in other sports. The vast majority of cycling events require two or more commissaries to fulfil a variety of roles, including supervising pre-and post-race formalities, briefing riders and race officials, checking the compliance of equipment, monitoring compliance with the rules and maintaining safety during racing, resolving disputes and judging results. Sitting as a panel they serve as a "race jury" chaired by the Chief Commissaire to resolve contentious decisions, although this term is now deprecated. The Chief Commissaire or President of the Commissaires' Panel is the holder of ultimate authority over the event.

Commissaires' administrative duties include checking riders' eligibility to compete and filing results and reports on race organisation, incidents and penalties.

Within the areas of the sport governed by the Union Cycliste Internationale, commissaires hold licences issued by their national federations. They qualify at various levels nationally, with the highest level, UCI International Commissaire, being assessed and awarded by the UCI itself. The UCI appoints the chief commissaires for international events on its calendar and the whole commissaires' panel for the most major events.

In the English-speaking world there have been sporadic efforts to rename commissaires in line with terms used in more locally familiar sports, although this can cause some confusion as some commissairing roles already use terms like "judge" and "referee". The British Cycling cycle speedway commission and The International Cycle Speedway Federation currently use the word 'referee'. There is no standard international uniform although some countries provide clothing; in the USA commissaires often wear the traditional black and white stripes worn by officials in American sports.

== Disciplines ==
=== Road cycling ===
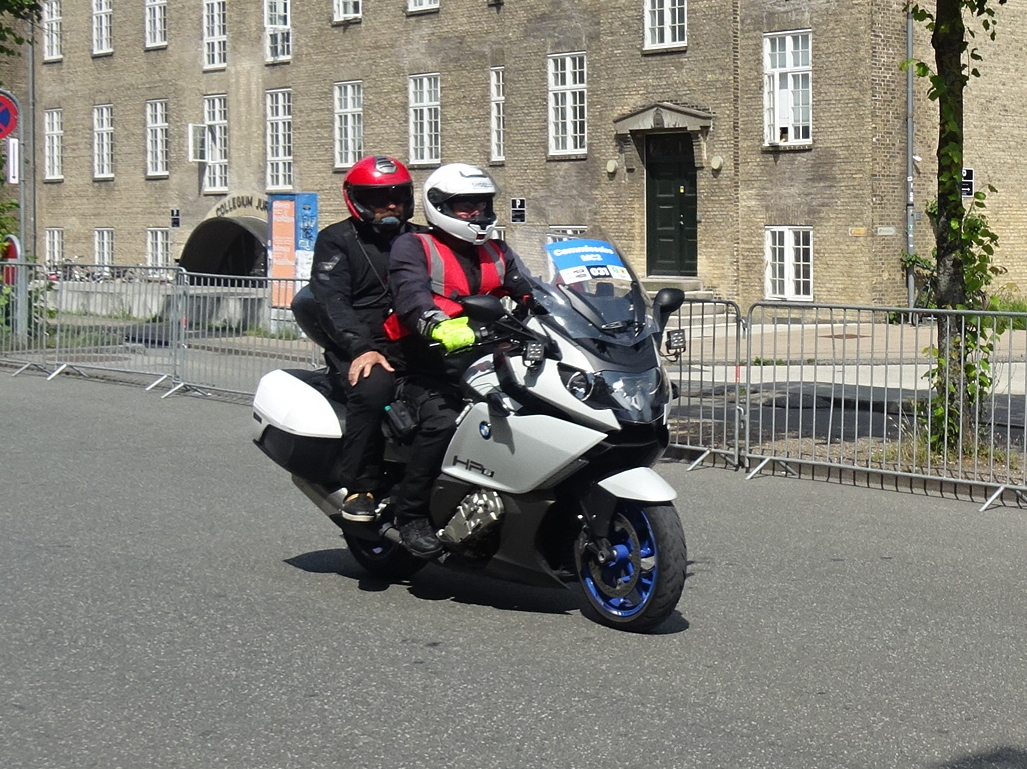
Commissaire at the 2025 Copenhagen Sprint (men's race).

In road racing, a tite of commissaires travel by car and sometimes motorcycle in the race convoy to supervise the riders and perform traffic management duties over team cars, neutral service vehicles, press and media vehicles and other vehicles in the race convoy. The chief commissaire – generally positioned in a car immediately behind the main bunch – decides when team cars can go up to the riders and which groups of riders need to have a commissaire with them when the race splits up. A separate judging team observe finishing sprints and intermediate primes and adjudicate the results with the assistance of photofinish and electronic timing equipment where available. A motorcycle commissaire may serve as a time-board official (ardoisier) responsible for identifying the composition of groups and time gaps between them and keeping the riders and officials informed. In races on short circuits the commissaires may perform their duties from the side of the road rather than in the convoy. In areas where races are run on the open road or with minimal closures, commissaires may need to liaise with law enforcement.

=== Track cycling ===
At a track meeting the main commissairing team will check machines, organise selection for heats, ensure riders are ready to take the track for their events, keep track of laps lost and gained in distance events and judge the results where required. A single commissaire in the role of commissaire-referee makes rapid decisions on breaches of the rules in relation to dangerous riding or irregular sprinting; their decisions are not subject to appeal.

=== Cyclo-cross ===
A commissaires role in the cyclo-cross is quite the same as in mountain biking. Making sure the track is safe. Checking equipment, and regulations up to that, keeping track of laps, and short-cutters.

== Grades ==
=== International commissaires ===
- A and B grades
- Olympic Games, World Cup, World Championships, and Commonwealth Games

International commissaires must have at least two years of experience as a national commissaire, and are proposed to the UCI by their national governing body.

National commissaires can operate in other countries as 'observer commissaires' as long as they have the permission of both their own and the foreign governing bodies.

With effect from 01 Jan 2014 passing UCI Elite National Commissaire course is mandatory for appearing in an International commissaire examination.

=== National grades ===
Commissaire grades below this level are governed by the relevant national cycling sport organisation such as USA Cycling or British Cycling. Some split grades into A and B divisions in the same way as the UCI. Award of a commissaire's licence is generally dependent on passing a written exam on the rules and race operation.

- National commissaire
- State commissaire (in some federal countries)
- Regional commissaire
- Divisional commissaire

Retired commissaires can sometimes continue in a mentoring role as a 'senior commissaire'.
