= 2025 Tour of Guangxi =

2025 UCI World Tour, race 36 of 36

Race details
- Dates: 14–19 October 2025
- Stages: 6
- Distance: 1,017.7 km (632.4 mi)
- Winning time: 22h 37' 12"

Results
Jersey awarded to the overall winner	Winner	Paul Double (GBR)	(Team Jayco–AlUla)
	Second	Victor Lafay (FRA)	(Decathlon–AG2R La Mondiale)
	Third	Jhonatan Narváez (ECU)	(UAE Team Emirates XRG)
Jersey awarded to the points classification winner	Points	Paul Magnier (FRA)	(Soudal–Quick-Step)
Jersey awarded to the mountains classification winner	Mountains	Simon Guglielmi (FRA)	(Arkéa–B&B Hotels)
Jersey awarded to the young rider classification winner	Young rider	Jørgen Nordhagen (NOR)	(Visma–Lease a Bike)
	Team	(Netherlands) Visma–Lease a Bike	

The 2025 Cotti Coffee Tour of Guangxi was a road cycling stage race that took place between 14 and 19 October 2025 in the Chinese province of Guangxi. It was the 6th edition of the Tour of Guangxi and the thirty-sixth and final event of the 2025 UCI World Tour.

== Teams ==
Twenty teams, consisting of seventeen of the eighteen UCI WorldTeams, two UCI ProTeams, and the Chinese national team, participated in the race.

UCI WorldTeams

- Arkéa–B&B Hotels
- Cofidis
- Decathlon–AG2R La Mondiale
- EF Education–EasyPost
- Groupama–FDJ
- INEOS Grenadiers
- Intermarché–Wanty
- Lidl–Trek
- Movistar Team
- Red Bull–Bora–Hansgrohe
- Soudal–Quick-Step
- Team Bahrain Victorious
- Team Jayco–AlUla
- Team Picnic–PostNL
- UAE Team Emirates XRG
- Visma–Lease a Bike
- XDS Astana Team

UCI ProTeams

- Israel–Premier Tech
- Lotto

National teams

- China

== Route ==
Stage characteristics and winners
Stage	Date	Course	Distance	Type	Stage winner
1	14 October	Fangchenggang to Fangchenggang	149.4 km (92.8 mi)	Flat stage	Paul Magnier (FRA)
2	15 October	Chongzuo to Jingxi	177.4 km (110.2 mi)	Hilly stage	Paul Magnier (FRA)
3	16 October	Jingxi to Bama	214 km (133.0 mi)	Hilly stage	Paul Magnier (FRA)
4	17 October	Bama to Jinchengjiang	176.8 km (109.9 mi)	Hilly stage	Paul Magnier (FRA)
5	18 October	Yizhou to Nongla	165.8 km (103.0 mi)	Medium mountain stage	Paul Double (GBR)
6	19 October	Nanning to Nanning	134.3 km (83.5 mi)	Hilly stage	Paul Magnier (FRA)
Total			1,017.7 km (632.4 mi)		

== Stages ==
=== Stage 1 ===
14 October 2025 — Fangchenggang to Fangchenggang, 149.4 km (92.8 mi)

Stage 1 result
Rank	Rider	Team	Time
1	Paul Magnier (FRA)	Soudal–Quick-Step	3h 19' 37"
2	Max Kanter (GER)	XDS Astana Team	+ 0"
3	Jordi Meeus (BEL)	Red Bull–Bora–Hansgrohe	+ 0"
4	Rasmus Søjberg Pedersen (DEN)	Decathlon–AG2R La Mondiale	+ 0"
5	Oded Kogut (ISR)	Israel–Premier Tech	+ 0"
6	Fernando Gaviria (COL)	Movistar Team	+ 0"
7	Stanisław Aniołkowski (POL)	Cofidis	+ 0"
8	Gianluca Pollefliet (BEL)	Decathlon–AG2R La Mondiale	+ 0"
9	Léandre Lozouet (FRA)	Arkéa–B&B Hotels	+ 0"
10	Dries Van Gestel (BEL)	Soudal–Quick-Step	+ 0"

General classification after Stage 1
Rank	Rider	Team	Time
1	Paul Magnier (FRA)	Soudal–Quick-Step	3h 19' 27"
2	Max Kanter (GER)	XDS Astana Team	+ 4"
3	Jordi Meeus (BEL)	Red Bull–Bora–Hansgrohe	+ 6"
4	Mathis Le Berre (FRA)	Arkéa–B&B Hotels	+ 7"
5	Aurélien Paret-Peintre (FRA)	Decathlon–AG2R La Mondiale	+ 7"
6	Julius Johansen (DEN)	UAE Team Emirates XRG	+ 8"
7	Attila Valter (HUN)	Visma–Lease a Bike	+ 8"
8	Rémy Rochas (FRA)	Groupama–FDJ	+ 9"
9	Jhonatan Narváez (ECU)	UAE Team Emirates XRG	+ 9"
10	Rasmus Søjberg Pedersen (DEN)	Decathlon–AG2R La Mondiale	+ 10"

=== Stage 2 ===
15 October 2025 — Chongzuo to Jingxi, 177.4 km (110.2 mi)

Stage 2 result
Rank	Rider	Team	Time
1	Paul Magnier (FRA)	Soudal–Quick-Step	3h 45' 10"
2	Pavel Bittner (CZE)	Team Picnic–PostNL	+ 0"
3	Stanisław Aniołkowski (POL)	Cofidis	+ 0"
4	Daniel Skerl (ITA)	Team Bahrain Victorious	+ 0"
5	Arne Marit (BEL)	Intermarché–Wanty	+ 0"
6	Max Kanter (GER)	XDS Astana Team	+ 0"
7	Robert Donaldson (GBR)	Team Jayco–AlUla	+ 0"
8	Paul Penhoët (FRA)	Groupama–FDJ	+ 0"
9	Jordi Meeus (BEL)	Red Bull–Bora–Hansgrohe	+ 0"
10	Oded Kogut (ISR)	Israel–Premier Tech	+ 0"

General classification after Stage 2
Rank	Rider	Team	Time
1	Paul Magnier (FRA)	Soudal–Quick-Step	7h 04' 27"
2	Max Kanter (GER)	XDS Astana Team	+ 14"
3	Pavel Bittner (CZE)	Team Picnic–PostNL	+ 14"
4	Peter Øxenberg (DEN)	INEOS Grenadiers	+ 15"
5	Stan Dewulf (BEL)	Decathlon–AG2R La Mondiale	+ 15"
6	Stanisław Aniołkowski (POL)	Cofidis	+ 16"
7	Jordi Meeus (BEL)	Red Bull–Bora–Hansgrohe	+ 16"
8	Mathis Le Berre (FRA)	Arkéa–B&B Hotels	+ 17"
9	Aurélien Paret-Peintre (FRA)	Decathlon–AG2R La Mondiale	+ 17"
10	Attila Valter (HUN)	Visma–Lease a Bike	+ 18"

=== Stage 3 ===
16 October 2025 — Jingxi to Bama, 214 km (133.0 mi)

Stage 3 result
Rank	Rider	Team	Time
1	Paul Magnier (FRA)	Soudal–Quick-Step	4h 50' 06"
2	Jordi Meeus (BEL)	Red Bull–Bora–Hansgrohe	+ 0"
3	Max Kanter (GER)	XDS Astana Team	+ 0"
4	Stanisław Aniołkowski (POL)	Cofidis	+ 0"
5	Daniel Skerl (ITA)	Team Bahrain Victorious	+ 0"
6	Oded Kogut (ISR)	Israel–Premier Tech	+ 0"
7	Paul Penhoët (FRA)	Groupama–FDJ	+ 0"
8	Fernando Gaviria (COL)	Movistar Team	+ 0"
9	Marijn van den Berg (NED)	EF Education–EasyPost	+ 0"
10	Arne Marit (BEL)	Intermarché–Wanty	+ 0"

General classification after Stage 3
Rank	Rider	Team	Time
1	Paul Magnier (FRA)	Soudal–Quick-Step	11h 54' 23"
2	Max Kanter (GER)	XDS Astana Team	+ 20"
3	Jordi Meeus (BEL)	Red Bull–Bora–Hansgrohe	+ 20"
4	Pavel Bittner (CZE)	Team Picnic–PostNL	+ 24"
5	Stan Dewulf (BEL)	Decathlon–AG2R La Mondiale	+ 25"
6	Peter Øxenberg (DEN)	INEOS Grenadiers	+ 25"
7	Stanisław Aniołkowski (POL)	Cofidis	+ 26"
8	Jhonatan Narváez (ECU)	UAE Team Emirates XRG	+ 26"
9	Mathis Le Berre (FRA)	Arkéa–B&B Hotels	+ 27"
10	Ryan Gibbons (RSA)	Lidl–Trek	+ 27"

=== Stage 4 ===
17 October 2025 — Bama to Jinchengjiang, 176.8 km (109.9 mi)

Stage 4 result
Rank	Rider	Team	Time
1	Paul Magnier (FRA)	Soudal–Quick-Step	4h 04' 54"
2	Pavel Bittner (CZE)	Team Picnic–PostNL	+ 0"
3	Jordi Meeus (BEL)	Red Bull–Bora–Hansgrohe	+ 0"
4	Paul Penhoët (FRA)	Groupama–FDJ	+ 0"
5	Fernando Gaviria (COL)	Movistar Team	+ 0"
6	Andrea Pasqualon (ITA)	Team Bahrain Victorious	+ 0"
7	Arne Marit (BEL)	Intermarché–Wanty	+ 0"
8	Kim Heiduk (GER)	INEOS Grenadiers	+ 0"
9	Max Walscheid (GER)	Team Jayco–AlUla	+ 0"
10	Ivo Oliveira (POR)	UAE Team Emirates XRG	+ 0"

General classification after Stage 4
Rank	Rider	Team	Time
1	Paul Magnier (FRA)	Soudal–Quick-Step	15h 59' 07"
2	Jordi Meeus (BEL)	Red Bull–Bora–Hansgrohe	+ 26"
3	Pavel Bittner (CZE)	Team Picnic–PostNL	+ 28"
4	Max Kanter (GER)	XDS Astana Team	+ 30"
5	Stan Dewulf (BEL)	Decathlon–AG2R La Mondiale	+ 33"
6	Jhonatan Narváez (ECU)	UAE Team Emirates XRG	+ 33"
7	Peter Øxenberg (DEN)	INEOS Grenadiers	+ 35"
8	Stanisław Aniołkowski (POL)	Cofidis	+ 36"
9	Mathis Le Berre (FRA)	Arkéa–B&B Hotels	+ 37"
10	Ryan Gibbons (RSA)	Lidl–Trek	+ 37"

=== Stage 5 ===
18 October 2025 — Yizhou to Nongla, 165.8 km (103.0 mi)

Stage 5 result
Rank	Rider	Team	Time
1	Paul Double (GBR)	Team Jayco–AlUla	3h 41' 38"
2	Victor Lafay (FRA)	Decathlon–AG2R La Mondiale	+ 9"
3	Mikkel Frølich Honoré (DEN)	EF Education–EasyPost	+ 11"
4	Jørgen Nordhagen (NOR)	Visma–Lease a Bike	+ 11"
5	Cian Uijtdebroeks (BEL)	Visma–Lease a Bike	+ 11"
6	Jhonatan Narváez (ECU)	UAE Team Emirates XRG	+ 11"
7	Kamiel Bonneu (BEL)	Intermarché–Wanty	+ 18"
8	Ben Zwiehoff (GER)	Red Bull–Bora–Hansgrohe	+ 19"
9	Tao Geoghegan Hart (GBR)	Lidl–Trek	+ 19"
10	Pello Bilbao (ESP)	Team Bahrain Victorious	+ 19"

General classification after Stage 5
Rank	Rider	Team	Time
1	Paul Double (GBR)	Team Jayco–AlUla	19h 41' 13"
2	Victor Lafay (FRA)	Decathlon–AG2R La Mondiale	+ 15"
3	Jhonatan Narváez (ECU)	UAE Team Emirates XRG	+ 16"
4	Mikkel Frølich Honoré (DEN)	EF Education–EasyPost	+ 19"
5	Jørgen Nordhagen (NOR)	Visma–Lease a Bike	+ 23"
6	Cian Uijtdebroeks (BEL)	Visma–Lease a Bike	+ 23"
7	Kamiel Bonneu (BEL)	Intermarché–Wanty	+ 30"
8	Pello Bilbao (ESP)	Team Bahrain Victorious	+ 31"
9	Ben Zwiehoff (GER)	Red Bull–Bora–Hansgrohe	+ 31"
10	Lukas Nerurkar (GBR)	EF Education–EasyPost	+ 31"

=== Stage 6 ===
19 October 2025 — Nanning to Nanning, 134.3 km (83.5 mi)

Stage 6 result
Rank	Rider	Team	Time
1	Paul Magnier (FRA)	Soudal–Quick-Step	2h 55' 59"
2	Stanisław Aniołkowski (POL)	Cofidis	+ 0"
3	Paul Penhoët (FRA)	Groupama–FDJ	+ 0"
4	Jordi Meeus (BEL)	Red Bull–Bora–Hansgrohe	+ 0"
5	Ivo Oliveira (POR)	UAE Team Emirates XRG	+ 0"
6	Pierre Gautherat (FRA)	Decathlon–AG2R La Mondiale	+ 0"
7	Andrea Pasqualon (ITA)	Team Bahrain Victorious	+ 0"
8	Riley Pickrell (CAN)	Israel–Premier Tech	+ 0"
9	Lukas Nerurkar (GBR)	EF Education–EasyPost	+ 0"
10	Patrick Eddy (AUS)	Team Picnic–PostNL	+ 0"

General classification after Stage 6
Rank	Rider	Team	Time
1	Paul Double (GBR)	Team Jayco–AlUla	22h 37' 12"
2	Victor Lafay (FRA)	Decathlon–AG2R La Mondiale	+ 15"
3	Jhonatan Narváez (ECU)	UAE Team Emirates XRG	+ 16"
4	Mikkel Frølich Honoré (DEN)	EF Education–EasyPost	+ 19"
5	Jørgen Nordhagen (NOR)	Visma–Lease a Bike	+ 23"
6	Cian Uijtdebroeks (BEL)	Visma–Lease a Bike	+ 23"
7	Kamiel Bonneu (BEL)	Intermarché–Wanty	+ 30"
8	Pello Bilbao (ESP)	Team Bahrain Victorious	+ 31"
9	Ben Zwiehoff (GER)	Red Bull–Bora–Hansgrohe	+ 31"
10	Lukas Nerurkar (GBR)	EF Education–EasyPost	+ 31"

== Classification leadership ==
Classification leadership by stage
Stage	Winner	General classification	Points classification	Mountains classification	Young rider classification	Team classification
1	Paul Magnier	Paul Magnier	Paul Magnier	not awarded	Paul Magnier	Soudal–Quick-Step
2	Paul Magnier	Paul Magnier	Paul Magnier	Peter Øxenberg	Paul Magnier	Team Jayco–AlUla
3	Paul Magnier	Paul Magnier	Paul Magnier	Simon Guglielmi	Paul Magnier	Team Jayco–AlUla
4	Paul Magnier	Paul Magnier	Paul Magnier	Simon Guglielmi	Paul Magnier	Movistar Team
5	Paul Double	Paul Double	Paul Magnier	Simon Guglielmi	Jørgen Nordhagen	Visma–Lease a Bike
6	Paul Magnier	Paul Double	Paul Magnier	Simon Guglielmi	Jørgen Nordhagen	Visma–Lease a Bike
Final		Paul Double	Paul Magnier	Simon Guglielmi	Jørgen Nordhagen	Visma–Lease a Bike

== Classification standings ==
Legend
General classification	Denotes the leader of the general classification	Mountain classification	Denotes the leader of the mountains classification
Points classification	Denotes the leader of the points classification	Young rider classification	Denotes the leader of the Young rider classification

=== General classification ===
Final general classification (1–10)
Rank	Rider	Team	Time
1	Paul Double (GBR)	Team Jayco–AlUla	22h 37' 12"
2	Victor Lafay (FRA)	Decathlon–AG2R La Mondiale	+ 15"
3	Jhonatan Narváez (ECU)	UAE Team Emirates XRG	+ 16"
4	Mikkel Frølich Honoré (DEN)	EF Education–EasyPost	+ 19"
5	Jørgen Nordhagen (NOR)	Visma–Lease a Bike	+ 23"
6	Cian Uijtdebroeks (BEL)	Visma–Lease a Bike	+ 23"
7	Kamiel Bonneu (BEL)	Intermarché–Wanty	+ 30"
8	Pello Bilbao (ESP)	Team Bahrain Victorious	+ 31"
9	Ben Zwiehoff (GER)	Red Bull–Bora–Hansgrohe	+ 31"
10	Lukas Nerurkar (GBR)	EF Education–EasyPost	+ 31"

=== Points classification ===
Final points classification (1–10)
Rank	Rider	Team	Points
1	Paul Magnier (FRA)	Soudal–Quick-Step	75
2	Jordi Meeus (BEL)	Red Bull–Bora–Hansgrohe	35
3	Stanisław Aniołkowski (POL)	Cofidis	29
4	Max Kanter (GER)	XDS Astana Team	23
5	Paul Penhoët (FRA)	Groupama–FDJ	22
6	Pavel Bittner (CZE)	Team Picnic–PostNL	20
7	Paul Double (GBR)	Team Jayco–AlUla	19
8	Jhonatan Narváez (ECU)	UAE Team Emirates XRG	19
9	Stan Dewulf (BEL)	Decathlon–AG2R La Mondiale	14
10	Fernando Gaviria (COL)	Movistar Team	14

=== Mountains classification ===
Final mountains classification (1–10)
Rank	Rider	Team	Points
1	Simon Guglielmi (FRA)	Arkéa–B&B Hotels	33
2	Paul Double (GBR)	Team Jayco–AlUla	22
3	Stan Dewulf (BEL)	Decathlon–AG2R La Mondiale	18
4	Ben Zwiehoff (GER)	Red Bull–Bora–Hansgrohe	15
5	Mikkel Frølich Honoré (DEN)	EF Education–EasyPost	10
6	Victor Lafay (FRA)	Decathlon–AG2R La Mondiale	8
7	Reuben Thompson (NZL)	Lotto	8
8	Peter Øxenberg (DEN)	INEOS Grenadiers	8
9	Ewen Costiou (FRA)	Arkéa–B&B Hotels	8
10	Ryan Gibbons (RSA)	Lidl–Trek	7

=== Young rider classification ===
Final young rider classification (1–10)
Rank	Rider	Team	Time
1	Jørgen Nordhagen (NOR)	Visma–Lease a Bike	22h 37' 35"
2	Cian Uijtdebroeks (BEL)	Visma–Lease a Bike	+ 0"
3	Lukas Nerurkar (GBR)	EF Education–EasyPost	+ 8"
4	Antoine Huby (FRA)	Soudal–Quick-Step	+ 12"
5	Lars Craps (BEL)	Lotto	+ 14"
6	Frank van den Broek (NED)	Team Picnic–PostNL	+ 15"
7	Jan Christen (SUI)	UAE Team Emirates XRG	+ 19"
8	Enzo Paleni (FRA)	Groupama–FDJ	+ 22"
9	Louis Rouland (FRA)	Arkéa–B&B Hotels	+ 22"
10	Andrew August (USA)	INEOS Grenadiers	+ 25"

=== Team classification ===
Final team classification (1–10)
Rank	Team	Time
1	(Netherlands) Visma–Lease a Bike	67h 53' 20"
2	(United Arab Emirates) UAE Team Emirates XRG	+ 29"
3	(Belgium) Lotto	+ 51"
4	(Australia) Team Jayco–AlUla	+ 1' 40"
5	(United States) EF Education–EasyPost	+ 1' 53"
6	(Germany) Red Bull–Bora–Hansgrohe	+ 2' 29"
7	(France) Arkéa–B&B Hotels	+ 2' 39"
8	(United Kingdom) INEOS Grenadiers	+ 2' 39"
9	(Kazakhstan) XDS Astana Team	+ 2' 48"
10	(Netherlands) Team Picnic–PostNL	+ 2' 52"
