= Simon Guglielmi =

French cyclist (born 1997)

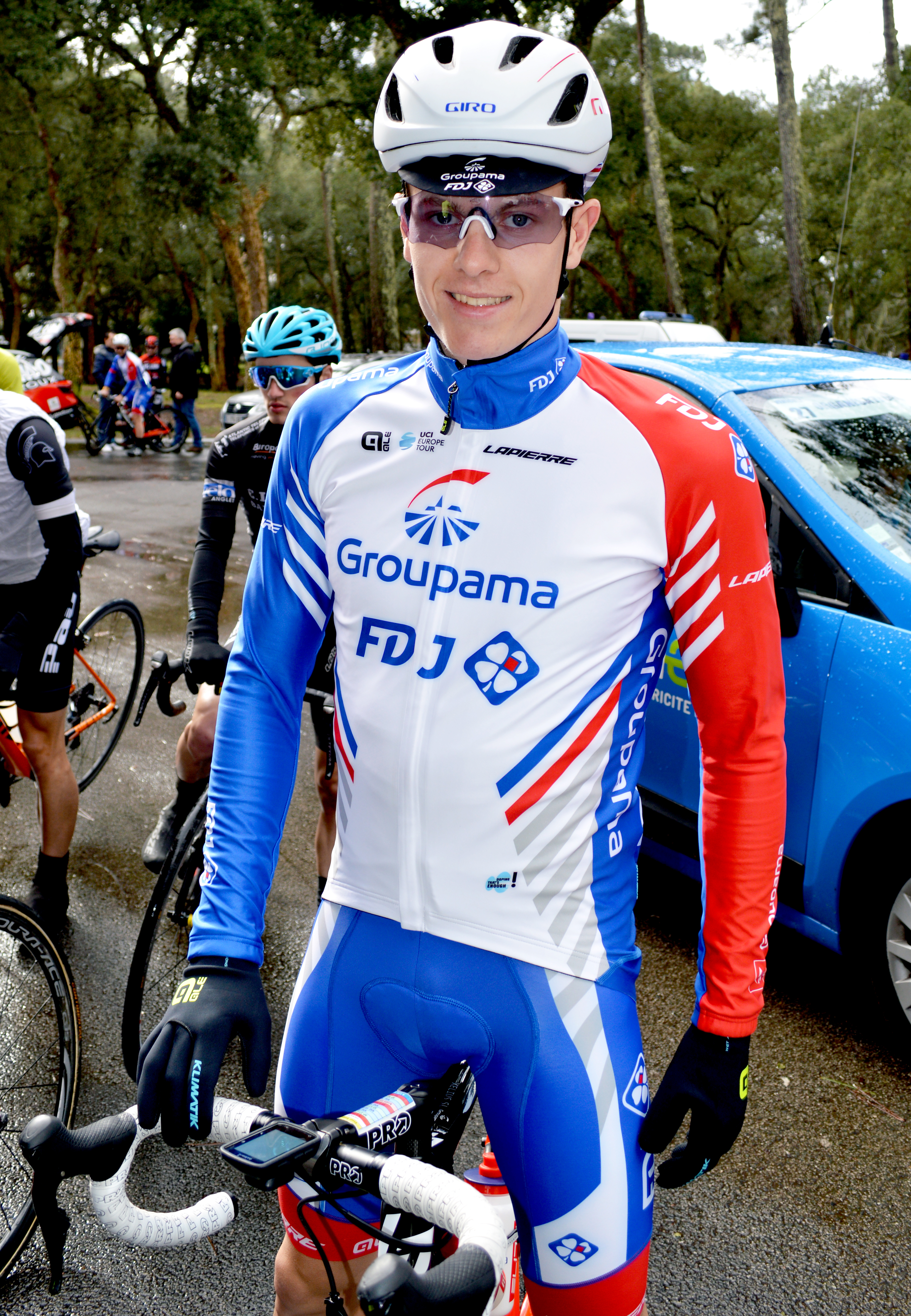
- Guglielmi in 2019

Personal information
- Born: 1 July 1997 (age 29) Chambéry, France
- Height: 1.8 m (5 ft 11 in)
- Weight: 66 kg (146 lb)

Cycling career
- Sport: Cycling
- Current team: Arkéa–Samsic
- Discipline: Road
- Role: Rider
- Rider type: Puncheur

Amateur team
- 2016–2018: CR4C Roanne

Professional teams
- 2019: Équipe Continentale Groupama–FDJ
- 2020–2021: Groupama–FDJ
- 2022–: Arkéa–Samsic

Simon Guglielmi (born 1 July 1997 in Chambéry) is a French cyclist, who currently rides for UCI WorldTeam Arkéa–B&B Hotels.

== Major results ==
2016
2nd Overall Grand Prix Chantal Biya

1st Mountains classification
1st Young rider classification

2017
7th Gent–Wevelgem U23
2018
8th Overall Kreiz Breizh Elites
8th Paris–Tours Espoirs
2019
1st Mountains classification, Tour Alsace
8th Overall Giro Ciclistico d'Italia
9th Piccolo Giro di Lombardia
2022
10th Boucles de l'Aulne
2023
Combativity award Stage 7 Tour de France
2025
1st Mountains classification, Tour of Guangxi

=== Grand Tour general classification results timeline ===
Grand Tour	2020	2021	2022	2023	2024	2025
Giro d'Italia	116	90	—	—	—	94
Tour de France	—	—	—	69	—	—
Vuelta a España	—	—	60	—	47	

Legend
—	Did not compete
DNF	Did not finish
