= 2023 Vuelta a Murcia =

2023 UCI Europe Tour

Race details
- Dates: 11 February 2023
- Distance: 184.3 km (114.5 mi)
- Winning time: 4h 24' 59"

Results
	Winner	Ben Turner (GBR)	(Ineos Grenadiers)
	Second	Simon Clarke (AUS)	(Israel–Premier Tech)
	Third	Jordi Meeus (BEL)	(Bora–Hansgrohe)

The 2023 Vuelta a Murcia was the 43rd edition of the Vuelta a Murcia road cycling race. It was held on 11 February 2023 in the titular region of southeastern Spain as a category 1.1 event on the 2023 UCI Europe Tour calendar.

== Teams ==
Twelve UCI WorldTeams, eight UCI ProTeams, and one UCI Continental teams made up the twenty-one teams that participated in the race. Of the 146 riders to start the race, 107 finished.

UCI WorldTeams

- Arkéa–Samsic
- Astana Qazaqstan Team
- Bora–Hansgrohe
- Cofidis
- Groupama–FDJ
- Ineos Grenadiers
- Intermarché–Circus–Wanty
- Israel–Premier Tech
- Lotto–Dstny
- Movistar Team
- Team TotalEnergies
- UAE Team Emirates

UCI ProTeams

- Burgos BH
- Caja Rural–Seguros RGA
- Eolo–Kometa
- Equipo Kern Pharma
- Euskaltel–Euskadi
- Q36.5 Pro Cycling Team
- Team Flanders–Baloise
- Tudor Pro Cycling Team

UCI Continental Teams

- Electro Hiper Europa–Caldas

== Results ==
Result
Rank	Rider	Team	Time
1	Ben Turner (GBR)	Ineos Grenadiers	4h 24' 59"
2	Simon Clarke (AUS)	Israel–Premier Tech	+ 0"
3	Jordi Meeus (BEL)	Bora–Hansgrohe	+ 0"
4	Valentin Madouas (FRA)	Groupama–FDJ	+ 0"
5	Matteo Trentin (ITA)	UAE Team Emirates	+ 0"
6	Tim Wellens (BEL)	UAE Team Emirates	+ 0"
7	Pascal Eenkhoorn (NED)	Lotto–Dstny	+ 0"
8	Loïc Vliegen (BEL)	Intermarché–Circus–Wanty	+ 0"
9	Milan Menten (BEL)	Lotto–Soudal	+ 0"
10	Gorka Izagirre (ESP)	Movistar Team	+ 0"
