= 2025 UCI World Tour =

Road cycling competitions

- Fifteenth edition of the UCI WorldTour

Details
- Dates: 21 January – 19 October
- Location: Australia; Canada; China; Europe; United Arab Emirates
- Races: 36

The 2025 UCI World Tour was a series of races that included thirty-six events throughout the 2025 cycling season. The tour started with the Tour Down Under on 21 January, and concluded with the Tour of Guangxi on 19 October.

At the end of the season, Slovenian rider Tadej Pogačar (UAE Team Emirates XRG) led the overall road world rankings ahead of Danish rider Jonas Vingegaard (Visma–Lease a Bike) and Mexican rider Isaac del Toro (UAE Team Emirates XRG). Pogačar won eight World Tour events during the season, including the Tour de France and three of the five cycling monuments.

== Events ==
The race calendar for the 2025 season was announced in June 2024, with thirty-six races scheduled. The calendar was similar to 2024, with a new one-day race in Denmark, the Copenhagen Sprint. In October 2024, the final calendar was confirmed.

Races in the 2025 UCI World Tour
Race	Date	Winner	Second	Third
(Australia) Tour Down Under	21–26 January	Jhonatan Narváez (ECU)	Javier Romo (ESP)	Finn Fisher-Black (NZL)
(Australia) Cadel Evans Great Ocean Road Race	2 February	Mauro Schmid (SUI)	Aaron Gate (NZL)	Laurence Pithie (NZL)
(United Arab Emirates) UAE Tour	17–23 February	Tadej Pogačar (SLO)	Giulio Ciccone (ITA)	Pello Bilbao (ESP)
(Belgium) Omloop Het Nieuwsblad	1 March	Søren Wærenskjold (NOR)	Paul Magnier (FRA)	Jasper Philipsen (BEL)
(Italy) Strade Bianche	8 March	Tadej Pogačar (SLO)	Tom Pidcock (GBR)	Tim Wellens (BEL)
(France) Paris–Nice	9–16 March	Matteo Jorgenson (USA)	Florian Lipowitz (GER)	Thymen Arensman (NED)
(Italy) Tirreno–Adriatico	10–16 March	Juan Ayuso (ESP)	Filippo Ganna (ITA)	Antonio Tiberi (ITA)
(Italy) Milan–San Remo	22 March	Mathieu van der Poel (NED)	Filippo Ganna (ITA)	Tadej Pogačar (SLO)
(Spain) Volta a Catalunya	24–30 March	Primož Roglič (SLO)	Juan Ayuso (ESP)	Enric Mas (ESP)
(Belgium) Classic Brugge–De Panne	26 March	Juan Sebastián Molano (COL)	Jonathan Milan (ITA)	Madis Mihkels (EST)
(Belgium) E3 Saxo Classic	28 March	Mathieu van der Poel (NED)	Mads Pedersen (DEN)	Filippo Ganna (ITA)
(Belgium) Gent–Wevelgem	30 March	Mads Pedersen (DEN)	Tim Merlier (BEL)	Jonathan Milan (ITA)
(Belgium) Dwars door Vlaanderen	2 April	Neilson Powless (USA)	Wout van Aert (BEL)	Tiesj Benoot (BEL)
(Belgium) Tour of Flanders	6 April	Tadej Pogačar (SLO)	Mads Pedersen (DEN)	Mathieu van der Poel (NED)
(Spain) Tour of the Basque Country	7–12 April	João Almeida (POR)	Enric Mas (ESP)	Max Schachmann (GER)
(France) Paris–Roubaix	13 April	Mathieu van der Poel (NED)	Tadej Pogačar (SLO)	Mads Pedersen (DEN)
(Netherlands) Amstel Gold Race	20 April	Mattias Skjelmose (DEN)	Tadej Pogačar (SLO)	Remco Evenepoel (BEL)
(Belgium) La Flèche Wallonne	23 April	Tadej Pogačar (SLO)	Kévin Vauquelin (FRA)	Tom Pidcock (GBR)
(Belgium) Liège–Bastogne–Liège	27 April	Tadej Pogačar (SLO)	Giulio Ciccone (ITA)	Ben Healy (IRL)
(Switzerland) Tour de Romandie	29 April – 4 May	João Almeida (POR)	Lenny Martinez (FRA)	Jay Vine (AUS)
(Germany) Eschborn–Frankfurt	1 May	Michael Matthews (AUS)	Magnus Cort (DEN)	Jon Barrenetxea (ESP)
(Italy) Giro d'Italia	9 May – 1 June	Simon Yates (GBR)	Isaac del Toro (MEX)	Richard Carapaz (ECU)
(France) Critérium du Dauphiné	8–15 June	Tadej Pogačar (SLO)	Jonas Vingegaard (DEN)	Florian Lipowitz (GER)
(Switzerland) Tour de Suisse	15–22 June	João Almeida (POR)	Kévin Vauquelin (FRA)	Oscar Onley (GBR)
(Denmark) Copenhagen Sprint	22 June	Jordi Meeus (BEL)	Alexis Renard (FRA)	Emilien Jeannière (FRA)
Tour de France	5–27 July	Tadej Pogačar (SLO)	Jonas Vingegaard (DEN)	Florian Lipowitz (GER)
(Spain) Clásica de San Sebastián	2 August	Giulio Ciccone (ITA)	Jan Christen (SUI)	Maxim Van Gils (BEL)
(Poland) Tour de Pologne	4–10 August	Brandon McNulty (USA)	Antonio Tiberi (ITA)	Matteo Sobrero (ITA)
(Germany) Hamburg Cyclassics	17 August	Rory Townsend (IRL)	Arnaud De Lie (BEL)	Paul Magnier (FRA)
(Belgium) / (Netherlands) Renewi Tour	20–24 August	Arnaud De Lie (BEL)	Mathieu van der Poel (NED)	Tim Wellens (BEL)
(Spain) Vuelta a España	23 August – 14 September	Jonas Vingegaard (DEN)	João Almeida (POR)	Tom Pidcock (GBR)
(France) Bretagne Classic	31 August	Arnaud De Lie (BEL)	Emilien Jeannière (FRA)	Olav Kooij (NED)
(Canada) Grand Prix Cycliste de Québec	12 September	Julian Alaphilippe (FRA)	Pavel Sivakov (FRA)	Alberto Bettiol (ITA)
(Canada) Grand Prix Cycliste de Montréal	14 September	Brandon McNulty (USA)	Tadej Pogačar (SLO)	Quinn Simmons (USA)
(Italy) Il Lombardia	11 October	Tadej Pogačar (SLO)	Remco Evenepoel (BEL)	Michael Storer (AUS)
(China) Tour of Guangxi	14–19 October	Paul Double (GBR)	Victor Lafay (FRA)	Jhonatan Narváez (ECU)

== Teams ==
The eighteen WorldTeams were automatically invited to compete in events, with the top two UCI ProTeams listed on the 2024 UCI World Ranking (Lotto and Israel–Premier Tech) also invited automatically. Other teams were invited by the organisers of each race.

- Alpecin–Deceuninck
- Arkéa–B&B Hotels
- Team Bahrain Victorious
- Cofidis
- Decathlon–AG2R La Mondiale
- EF Education–EasyPost
- Groupama–FDJ
- Ineos Grenadiers
- Intermarché–Wanty
- Team Jayco–AlUla
- Lidl–Trek
- Movistar Team
- Team Picnic–PostNL
- Red Bull–Bora–Hansgrohe
- Soudal–Quick-Step
- UAE Team Emirates XRG
- Visma–Lease a Bike
- XDS Astana Team
