= 2025 Tour de Pologne =

2025 UCI World Tour, race 28 of 36

Race details
- Dates: 4–10 August 2025
- Stages: 7
- Distance: 1,075.3 km (668.2 mi)
- Winning time: 25h 10' 57"

Results
Jersey awarded to the overall winner	Winner	Brandon McNulty (USA)	(UAE Team Emirates XRG)
	Second	Antonio Tiberi (ITA)	(Team Bahrain Victorious)
	Third	Matteo Sobrero (ITA)	(Red Bull–Bora–Hansgrohe)
Jersey awarded to the points classification winner	Points	Ben Turner (GBR)	(INEOS Grenadiers)
Jersey awarded to the mountains classification winner	Mountains	Timo Kielich (BEL)	(Alpecin–Deceuninck)
Jersey awarded to the combativity classification winner	Combativity	Patryk Stosz (POL)	(Poland)
	Team	(United Arab Emirates) UAE Team Emirates XRG	

The 2025 Tour de Pologne was the 82nd edition of the Tour de Pologne road cycling stage race, and the 28th event of the men's 2025 UCI World Tour. The race began on 4 August in Wrocław and was finished on 10 August in Wieliczka. Brandon McNulty won the time trial on the last day of the race to move into first and win the yellow jersey.

== Teams ==
All eighteen UCI WorldTeams, three UCI ProTeams, and the Polish national team make up the twenty-two teams that participate in the race.

UCI WorldTeams

- Alpecin–Deceuninck
- Arkéa–B&B Hotels
- Cofidis
- Decathlon–AG2R La Mondiale
- EF Education–EasyPost
- Groupama–FDJ
- INEOS Grenadiers
- Intermarché–Wanty
- Lidl–Trek
- Movistar Team
- Red Bull–Bora–Hansgrohe
- Soudal–Quick-Step
- Team Bahrain Victorious
- Team Picnic–PostNL
- Team Jayco–AlUla
- UAE Team Emirates XRG
- Visma–Lease a Bike
- XDS Astana Team

UCI ProTeams

- Israel–Premier Tech
- Lotto
- Tudor Pro Cycling Team

National Teams

- Poland

== Schedule ==
Stage characteristics and winners
Stage	Date	Course	Distance	Type	Stage winner
1	4 August	Wrocław to Legnica	199.7 km (124.1 mi)	Flat stage	Olav Kooij (NED)
2	5 August	Hotel Gołębiewski Karpacz to Karpacz	149.4 km (92.8 mi)	Hilly stage	Paul Lapeira (FRA)
3	6 August	Wałbrzych to Wałbrzych	159.3 km (99.0 mi)	Hilly stage	Ben Turner (GBR)
4	7 August	Rybnik to Cieszyn	201.4 km (125.1 mi)	Hilly stage	Paul Magnier (FRA)
5	8 August	Katowice to Zakopane	206.1 km (128.1 mi)	Hilly stage	Matthew Brennan (GBR)
6	9 August	Bukowina Resort to Bukowina Tatrzańska	147.5 km (91.7 mi)	Hilly stage	Victor Langellotti (MON)
7	10 August	Wieliczka to Wieliczka	12.5 km (7.8 mi)	Individual time trial	Brandon McNulty (USA)
Total			1,075.9 km (668.5 mi)		

== Stages ==
=== Stage 1 ===
4 August 2025 – Wrocław to Legnica, 199.7 km (124.1 mi)

Stage 1 Result
Rank	Rider	Team	Time
1	Olav Kooij (NED)	Visma–Lease a Bike	4h 26' 36"
2	Paul Magnier (FRA)	Soudal–Quick-Step	+ 0"
3	Jensen Plowright (AUS)	Alpecin–Deceuninck	+ 0"
4	Maikel Zijlaard (NED)	Tudor Pro Cycling Team	+ 0"
5	Ethan Vernon (GBR)	Israel–Premier Tech	+ 0"
6	Stanisław Aniołkowski (POL)	Cofidis	+ 0"
7	Ben Turner (GBR)	INEOS Grenadiers	+ 0"
8	Florian Vermeersch (BEL)	UAE Team Emirates XRG	+ 0"
9	Max Kanter (GER)	XDS Astana Team	+ 0"
10	Rasmus Søjberg Pedersen (DEN)	Decathlon–AG2R La Mondiale	+ 0"

General classification after Stage 1
Rank	Rider	Team	Time
1	Olav Kooij (NED)	Visma–Lease a Bike	4h 26' 26"
2	Donavan Grondin (FRA)	Arkéa–B&B Hotels	+ 2"
3	Paul Magnier (FRA)	Soudal–Quick-Step	+ 4"
4	Patryk Stosz (POL)	Poland	+ 5"
5	Lars Boven (NED)	Alpecin–Deceuninck	+ 5"
6	Jensen Plowright (AUS)	Alpecin–Deceuninck	+ 6"
7	Maikel Zijlaard (NED)	Tudor Pro Cycling Team	+ 10"
8	Ethan Vernon (GBR)	Israel–Premier Tech	+ 10"
9	Stanisław Aniołkowski (POL)	Cofidis	+ 10"
10	Ben Turner (GBR)	INEOS Grenadiers	+ 10"

=== Stage 2 ===
5 August 2025 – Hotel Gołębiewski Karpacz to Karpacz, 149.4 km (92.8 mi)

Stage 2 Result
Rank	Rider	Team	Time
1	Paul Lapeira (FRA)	Decathlon–AG2R La Mondiale	3h 29' 58"
2	Mathias Vacek (CZE)	Lidl–Trek	+ 2"
3	Victor Langellotti (MON)	INEOS Grenadiers	+ 2"
4	Antonio Tiberi (ITA)	Team Bahrain Victorious	+ 2"
5	Jan Christen (SUI)	UAE Team Emirates XRG	+ 2"
6	Rudy Molard (FRA)	Groupama–FDJ	+ 4"
7	Brandon McNulty (USA)	UAE Team Emirates XRG	+ 4"
8	Finn Fisher-Black (NZL)	Red Bull–Bora–Hansgrohe	+ 4"
9	Quinten Hermans (BEL)	Alpecin–Deceuninck	+ 4"
10	Rafał Majka (POL)	UAE Team Emirates XRG	+ 4"

General classification after Stage 2
Rank	Rider	Team	Time
1	Paul Lapeira (FRA)	Decathlon–AG2R La Mondiale	7h 56' 24"
2	Mathias Vacek (CZE)	Lidl–Trek	+ 6"
3	Victor Langellotti (MON)	INEOS Grenadiers	+ 8"
4	Jan Christen (SUI)	UAE Team Emirates XRG	+ 12"
5	Antonio Tiberi (ITA)	Team Bahrain Victorious	+ 12"
6	Brandon McNulty (USA)	UAE Team Emirates XRG	+ 14"
7	Finn Fisher-Black (NZL)	Red Bull–Bora–Hansgrohe	+ 14"
8	Quinten Hermans (BEL)	Alpecin–Deceuninck	+ 14"
9	Rafał Majka (POL)	UAE Team Emirates XRG	+ 14"
10	Mikkel Frølich Honoré (DEN)	EF Education–EasyPost	+ 18"

=== Stage 3 ===
6 August 2025 – Wałbrzych to Wałbrzych, 159.3 km (99.0 mi)

Stage 3 Result
Rank	Rider	Team	Time
1	Ben Turner (GBR)	INEOS Grenadiers	4h 00' 46"
2	Pello Bilbao (ESP)	Team Bahrain Victorious	+ 0"
3	Andrea Bagioli (ITA)	Lidl–Trek	+ 0"
4	Jan Christen (SUI)	UAE Team Emirates XRG	+ 0"
5	Arjen Livyns (BEL)	Lotto	+ 0"
6	Quinten Hermans (BEL)	Alpecin–Deceuninck	+ 0"
7	Pepijn Reinderink (NED)	Soudal–Quick-Step	+ 0"
8	Francesco Busatto (ITA)	Intermarché–Wanty	+ 0"
9	Jasha Sütterlin (GER)	Team Jayco–AlUla	+ 0"
10	Marcin Budziński (POL)	Poland	+ 0"

General classification after Stage 3
Rank	Rider	Team	Time
1	Paul Lapeira (FRA)	Decathlon–AG2R La Mondiale	11h 57' 10"
2	Victor Langellotti (MON)	INEOS Grenadiers	+ 8"
3	Jan Christen (SUI)	UAE Team Emirates XRG	+ 12"
4	Antonio Tiberi (ITA)	Team Bahrain Victorious	+ 12"
5	Quinten Hermans (BEL)	Alpecin–Deceuninck	+ 14"
6	Finn Fisher-Black (NZL)	Red Bull–Bora–Hansgrohe	+ 14"
7	Brandon McNulty (USA)	UAE Team Emirates XRG	+ 14"
8	Rafał Majka (POL)	UAE Team Emirates XRG	+ 14"
9	Mikkel Frølich Honoré (DEN)	EF Education–EasyPost	+ 18"
10	Alberto Bettiol (ITA)	XDS Astana Team	+ 18"

=== Stage 4 ===
7 August 2025 – Rybnik to Cieszyn, 201.4 km (125.1 mi)

Stage 4 Result
Rank	Rider	Team	Time
1	Paul Magnier (FRA)	Soudal–Quick-Step	4h 36' 09"
2	Ben Turner (GBR)	INEOS Grenadiers	+ 0"
3	Tim Torn Teutenberg (GER)	Lidl–Trek	+ 0"
4	Thibaud Gruel (FRA)	Groupama–FDJ	+ 0"
5	Madis Mihkels (EST)	EF Education–EasyPost	+ 0"
6	Stanisław Aniołkowski (POL)	Cofidis	+ 0"
7	Tim van Dijke (NED)	Red Bull–Bora–Hansgrohe	+ 0"
8	Jensen Plowright (AUS)	Alpecin–Deceuninck	+ 0"
9	Finn Fisher-Black (NZL)	Red Bull–Bora–Hansgrohe	+ 0"
10	Jan Christen (SUI)	UAE Team Emirates XRG	+ 0"

General classification after Stage 4
Rank	Rider	Team	Time
1	Paul Lapeira (FRA)	Decathlon–AG2R La Mondiale	16h 33' 19"
2	Victor Langellotti (MON)	INEOS Grenadiers	+ 8"
3	Jan Christen (SUI)	UAE Team Emirates XRG	+ 12"
4	Antonio Tiberi (ITA)	Team Bahrain Victorious	+ 12"
5	Finn Fisher-Black (NZL)	Red Bull–Bora–Hansgrohe	+ 14"
6	Quinten Hermans (BEL)	Alpecin–Deceuninck	+ 14"
7	Brandon McNulty (USA)	UAE Team Emirates XRG	+ 14"
8	Rafał Majka (POL)	UAE Team Emirates XRG	+ 14"
9	Mikkel Frølich Honoré (DEN)	EF Education–EasyPost	+ 18"
10	Alberto Bettiol (ITA)	XDS Astana Team	+ 18"

=== Stage 5 ===
8 August 2025 – Katowice to Zakopane, 206.1 km (128.1 mi)

Stage 5 Result
Rank	Rider	Team	Time
1	Matthew Brennan (GBR)	Visma–Lease a Bike	4h 50' 04"
2	Ben Turner (GBR)	INEOS Grenadiers	+ 0"
3	Andrea Bagioli (ITA)	Lidl–Trek	+ 0"
4	Andrea Raccagni Noviero (ITA)	Soudal–Quick-Step	+ 0"
5	Thibaud Gruel (FRA)	Groupama–FDJ	+ 0"
6	Antonio Tiberi (ITA)	Team Bahrain Victorious	+ 0"
7	Finn Fisher-Black (NZL)	Red Bull–Bora–Hansgrohe	+ 0"
8	Alberto Bettiol (ITA)	XDS Astana Team	+ 0"
9	Pier-André Côté (CAN)	Israel–Premier Tech	+ 0"
10	Lorenzo Milesi (ITA)	Movistar Team	+ 0"

General classification after Stage 5
Rank	Rider	Team	Time
1	Paul Lapeira (FRA)	Decathlon–AG2R La Mondiale	21h 23' 23"
2	Victor Langellotti (MON)	INEOS Grenadiers	+ 8"
3	Jan Christen (SUI)	UAE Team Emirates XRG	+ 12"
4	Antonio Tiberi (ITA)	Team Bahrain Victorious	+ 12"
5	Finn Fisher-Black (NZL)	Red Bull–Bora–Hansgrohe	+ 14"
6	Quinten Hermans (BEL)	Alpecin–Deceuninck	+ 14"
7	Brandon McNulty (USA)	UAE Team Emirates XRG	+ 14"
8	Rafał Majka (POL)	UAE Team Emirates XRG	+ 14"
9	Alberto Bettiol (ITA)	XDS Astana Team	+ 18"
10	Matteo Sobrero (ITA)	Red Bull–Bora–Hansgrohe	+ 19"

=== Stage 6 ===
9 August 2025 – Bukowina Resort to Bukowina Tatrzańska, 147.5 km (91.7 mi)

Stage 6 Result
Rank	Rider	Team	Time
1	Victor Langellotti (MON)	INEOS Grenadiers	3h 32' 58"
2	Brandon McNulty (USA)	UAE Team Emirates XRG	+ 0"
3	Pello Bilbao (ESP)	Team Bahrain Victorious	+ 7"
4	Johannes Staune-Mittet (NOR)	Decathlon–AG2R La Mondiale	+ 8"
5	Antonio Tiberi (ITA)	Team Bahrain Victorious	+ 8"
6	Yannis Voisard (SUI)	Tudor Pro Cycling Team	+ 8"
7	Marco Frigo (ITA)	Israel–Premier Tech	+ 8"
8	Matteo Sobrero (ITA)	Red Bull–Bora–Hansgrohe	+ 8"
9	Rafał Majka (POL)	UAE Team Emirates XRG	+ 8"
10	Jan Christen (SUI)	UAE Team Emirates XRG	+ 8"

General classification after Stage 6
Rank	Rider	Team	Time
1	Victor Langellotti (MON)	INEOS Grenadiers	24h 56' 19"
2	Brandon McNulty (USA)	UAE Team Emirates XRG	+ 7"
3	Antonio Tiberi (ITA)	Team Bahrain Victorious	+ 20"
4	Jan Christen (SUI)	UAE Team Emirates XRG	+ 21"
5	Pello Bilbao (ESP)	Team Bahrain Victorious	+ 24"
6	Rafał Majka (POL)	UAE Team Emirates XRG	+ 24"
7	Alberto Bettiol (ITA)	XDS Astana Team	+ 28"
8	Matteo Sobrero (ITA)	Red Bull–Bora–Hansgrohe	+ 29"
9	Filippo Zana (ITA)	Team Jayco–AlUla	+ 29"
10	Marco Frigo (ITA)	Israel–Premier Tech	+ 29"

=== Stage 7 ===
10 August 2025 – Wieliczka to Wieliczka, 12.5 km (7.8 mi) (ITT)

Stage 7 Result
Rank	Rider	Team	Time
1	Brandon McNulty (USA)	UAE Team Emirates XRG	14' 31"
2	Lorenzo Milesi (ITA)	Movistar Team	+ 12"
3	Matteo Sobrero (ITA)	Red Bull–Bora–Hansgrohe	+ 15"
4	Antonio Tiberi (ITA)	Team Bahrain Victorious	+ 16"
5	Ben Turner (GBR)	INEOS Grenadiers	+ 19"
6	Stefan Küng (SUI)	Groupama–FDJ	+ 20"
7	Huub Artz (NED)	Intermarché–Wanty	+ 23"
8	Jan Christen (SUI)	UAE Team Emirates XRG	+ 25"
9	Marco Frigo (ITA)	Israel–Premier Tech	+ 26"
10	Alberto Bettiol (ITA)	XDS Astana Team	+ 26"

General classification after Stage 7
Rank	Rider	Team	Time
1	Brandon McNulty (USA)	UAE Team Emirates XRG	25h 10' 57"
2	Antonio Tiberi (ITA)	Team Bahrain Victorious	+ 29"
3	Matteo Sobrero (ITA)	Red Bull–Bora–Hansgrohe	+ 37"
4	Jan Christen (SUI)	UAE Team Emirates XRG	+ 39"
5	Victor Langellotti (MON)	INEOS Grenadiers	+ 39"
6	Alberto Bettiol (ITA)	XDS Astana Team	+ 47"
7	Marco Frigo (ITA)	Israel–Premier Tech	+ 48"
8	Rafał Majka (POL)	UAE Team Emirates XRG	+ 59"
9	Pello Bilbao (ESP)	Team Bahrain Victorious	+ 1' 02"
10	Filippo Zana (ITA)	Team Jayco–AlUla	+ 1' 09"

== Classification leadership table ==
Classification leadership by stage
Stage	Winner	General classification (Polish: Klasyfikacja generalna)	Points classification (Polish: Klasyfikacja punktowa)	Mountains classification (Polish: Klasyfikacja górska)	Active rider classification (Polish: Klasyfikacja najaktywniejszych)	Polish rider classification (Polish: Najlepszy Polak)	Team classification (Polish: Klasyfikacja drużynowa)
1	Olav Kooij	Olav Kooij	Olav Kooij	Bauke Mollema	Donovan Grondin	Patryk Stosz	XDS Astana Team
2	Paul Lapeira	Paul Lapeira	Paul Lapeira	Tomasz Budziński	Patryk Stosz	Rafał Majka	UAE Team Emirates XRG
3	Ben Turner	Paul Lapeira	Ben Turner	Timo Kielich	Patryk Stosz	Rafał Majka	UAE Team Emirates XRG
4	Paul Magnier	Paul Lapeira	Ben Turner	Timo Kielich	Patryk Stosz	Rafał Majka	UAE Team Emirates XRG
5	Matthew Brennan	Paul Lapeira	Ben Turner	Timo Kielich	Patryk Stosz	Rafał Majka	UAE Team Emirates XRG
6	Victor Langellotti	Victor Langellotti	Ben Turner	Timo Kielich	Patryk Stosz	Rafał Majka	UAE Team Emirates XRG
7	Brandon McNulty	Brandon McNulty	Ben Turner	Timo Kielich	Patryk Stosz	Rafał Majka	UAE Team Emirates XRG
Final		Brandon McNulty	Ben Turner	Timo Kielich	Patryk Stosz	Rafał Majka	UAE Team Emirates XRG

== Classification standings ==
Legend
Denotes the winner of the general classification	Denotes the winner of the points classification
Denotes the winner of the mountains classification	Denotes the winner of the active rider classification

=== General classification ===
Final general classification (1–10)
Rank	Rider	Team	Time
1	Brandon McNulty (USA)	UAE Team Emirates XRG	25h 10' 57"
2	Antonio Tiberi (ITA)	Team Bahrain Victorious	+ 29"
3	Matteo Sobrero (ITA)	Red Bull–Bora–Hansgrohe	+ 37"
4	Jan Christen (SUI)	UAE Team Emirates XRG	+ 39"
5	Victor Langellotti (MON)	INEOS Grenadiers	+ 39"
6	Alberto Bettiol (ITA)	XDS Astana Team	+ 47"
7	Marco Frigo (ITA)	Israel–Premier Tech	+ 48"
8	Rafał Majka (POL)	UAE Team Emirates XRG	+ 59"
9	Pello Bilbao (ESP)	Team Bahrain Victorious	+ 1' 02"
10	Filippo Zana (ITA)	Team Jayco–AlUla	+ 1' 09"

=== Points classification ===
Final points classification (1–10)
Rank	Rider	Team	Points
1	Ben Turner (GBR)	INEOS Grenadiers	88
2	Jan Christen (SUI)	UAE Team Emirates XRG	71
3	Brandon McNulty (USA)	UAE Team Emirates XRG	69
4	Antonio Tiberi (ITA)	Team Bahrain Victorious	65
5	Pello Bilbao (ESP)	Team Bahrain Victorious	55
6	Alberto Bettiol (ITA)	XDS Astana Team	52
7	Victor Langellotti (MON)	INEOS Grenadiers	48
8	Andrea Bagioli (ITA)	Lidl–Trek	40
9	Paul Magnier (FRA)	Soudal–Quick-Step	39
10	Matteo Sobrero (ITA)	Red Bull–Bora–Hansgrohe	38

=== Mountains classification ===
Final mountains classification (1–10)
Rank	Rider	Team	Points
1	Timo Kielich (BEL)	Alpecin–Deceuninck	75
2	Patrick Gamper (AUT)	Team Jayco–AlUla	26
3	Tomasz Budziński (POL)	Poland	23
4	Antonio Tiberi (ITA)	Team Bahrain Victorious	20
5	Chris Hamilton (AUS)	Team Picnic–PostNL	20
6	Filip Maciejuk (POL)	Red Bull–Bora–Hansgrohe	19
7	Reuben Thompson (NZL)	Lotto	16
8	Jensen Plowright (AUS)	Alpecin–Deceuninck	15
9	Colby Simmons (USA)	EF Education–EasyPost	15
10	Brandon McNulty (USA)	UAE Team Emirates XRG	14

=== Active rider classification ===
Final active rider classification (1–10)
Rank	Rider	Team	Points
1	Patryk Stosz (POL)	Poland	11
2	Timo Kielich (BEL)	Alpecin–Deceuninck	6
3	Patrick Gamper (AUT)	Team Jayco–AlUla	5
4	Brandon McNulty (USA)	UAE Team Emirates XRG	3
5	Jensen Plowright (AUS)	Alpecin–Deceuninck	3
6	Huub Artz (NED)	Intermarché–Wanty	3
7	Martin Svrček (SVK)	Soudal–Quick-Step	3
8	Max Walker (GBR)	EF Education–EasyPost	3
9	Antonio Tiberi (ITA)	Team Bahrain Victorious	2
10	Colby Simmons (USA)	EF Education–EasyPost	2

=== Team classification ===
Final team classification (1–10)
Rank	Team	Time
1	(United Arab Emirates) UAE Team Emirates XRG	75h 34' 39"
2	Israel–Premier Tech	+ 3' 07"
3	Team Bahrain Victorious	+ 5' 33"
4	(United States) Lidl–Trek	+ 7' 24"
5	(Netherlands) Visma–Lease a Bike	+ 11' 55"
6	(Kazakhstan) XDS Astana Team	+ 12' 14"
7	(France) Groupama–FDJ	+ 13' 27"
8	(Netherlands) Team Picnic–PostNL	+ 14' 19"
9	Poland	+ 16' 31"
10	(Spain) Movistar Team	+ 17' 42"

== See also ==
- Tour of Małopolska
