= 2025 Copenhagen Sprint (women's race) =

Cycling race

2025 UCI Women's World Tour, race 20 of 27
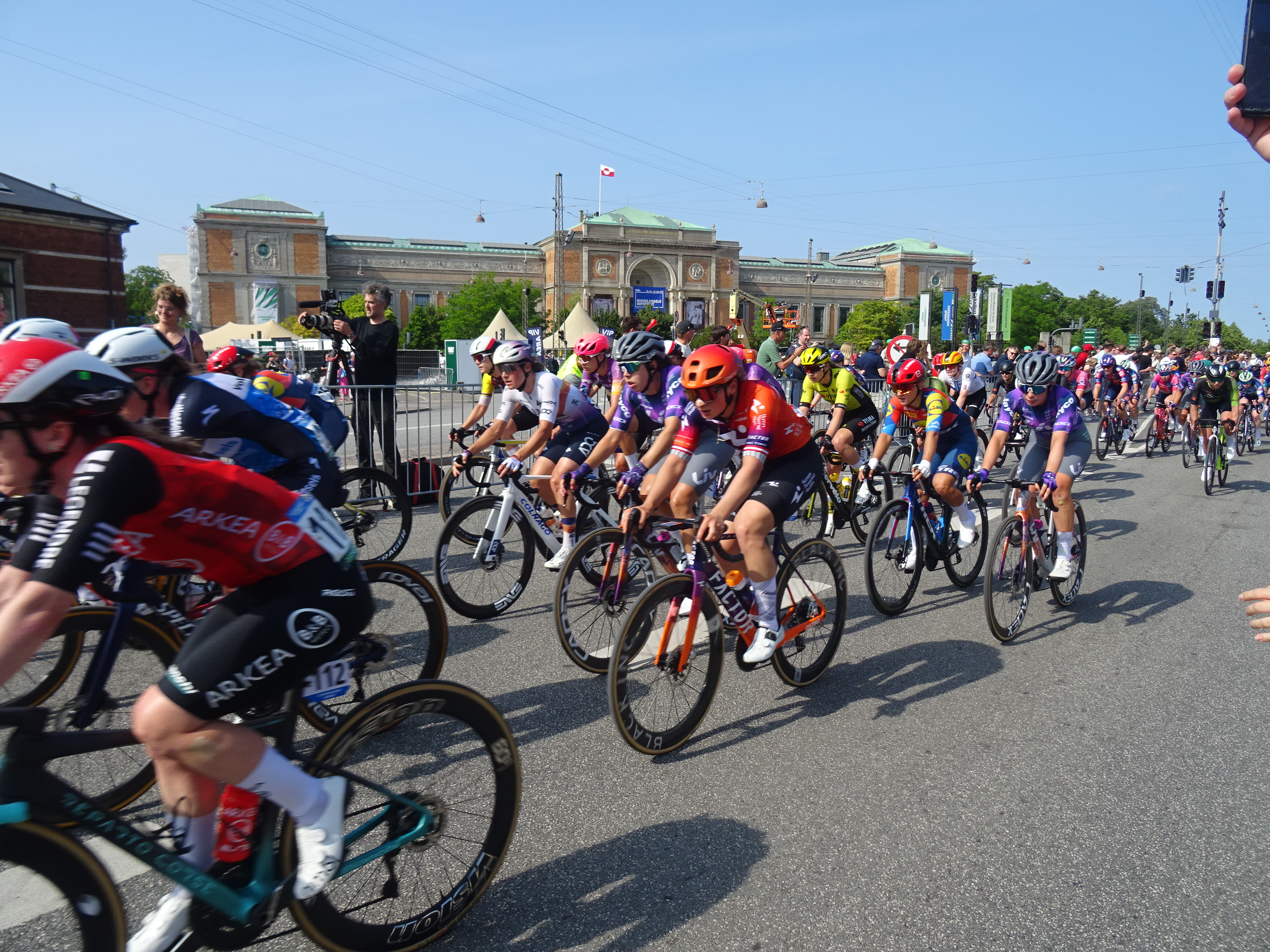
- The peloton passing the National Gallery of Denmark

Race details
- Dates: 21 June 2025
- Stages: 1
- Distance: 151 km (94 mi)
- Winning time: 3h 32' 30"

Results
	Winner	Lorena Wiebes (NED)	(Team SD Worx–Protime)
	Second	Elisa Balsamo (ITA)	(Lidl–Trek)
	Third	Chiara Consonni (ITA)	(Canyon//SRAM Zondacrypto)

The 2025 Copenhagen Sprint was a Danish road cycling one-day race that took place on 21 June. It was the first edition of the Copenhagen Sprint and the 20th event of the 2025 UCI Women's World Tour. The race was held the day before the inaugural men's Copenhagen Sprint. Dutch rider Lorena Wiebes of Team SD Worx–Protime won the race in a sprint finish.

== Teams ==
Eleven UCI Women's WorldTeams, three UCI Women's ProTeams, five UCI Women's Continental Teams, and the Danish national team took part in the race.

UCI Women's WorldTeams

- AG Insurance–Soudal
- Canyon//SRAM Zondacrypto
- Ceratizit Pro Cycling
- Human Powered Health
- Lidl–Trek
- Liv AlUla Jayco
- Team Picnic–PostNL
- Team SD Worx–Protime
- UAE Team ADQ
- Uno-X Mobility
- Visma–Lease a Bike

UCI Women's ProTeams

- CJ O'Shea Racing
- Cofidis
- VolkerWessels Cycling Team

UCI Women's Continental Teams

- BePink–Imatra–Bongioanni
- DD Group Pro Cycling Team
- DAS–Hutchinson
- Hess Cycling Team
- Team Coop–Repsol

National teams

- Denmark

== Course ==
The race took place over 160 kilometres (99 mi), starting at the Viking Ship Museum in Roskilde. The race then headed into Zealand, passing Frederikssund, Hillerød, and Ballerup. The race then entered Copenhagen for 3 laps of a 10 kilometres (6.2 mi) finishing circuit in the city centre. The finish of the race was outside the National Gallery of Denmark, in the Østre Anlæg park.

== Result ==
Result
Rank	Rider	Team	Time
1	Lorena Wiebes (NED)	Team SD Worx–Protime	3h 32' 30"
2	Elisa Balsamo (ITA)	Lidl–Trek	+ 0"
3	Chiara Consonni (ITA)	Canyon//SRAM Zondacrypto	+ 0"
4	Charlotte Kool (NED)	Team Picnic–PostNL	+ 0"
5	Nienke Veenhoven (NED)	Visma–Lease a Bike	+ 0"
6	Lily Williams (USA)	Human Powered Health	+ 0"
7	Susanne Andersen (NOR)	Uno-X Mobility	+ 0"
8	Amalie Dideriksen (DEN)	Cofidis	+ 0"
9	Mylène de Zoete (NED)	Ceratizit Pro Cycling	+ 3"
10	Sofia Bertizzolo (ITA)	UAE Team ADQ	+ 3"
