= 2025 Copenhagen Sprint (men's race) =

Cycling race

2025 UCI World Tour, race 25 of 36
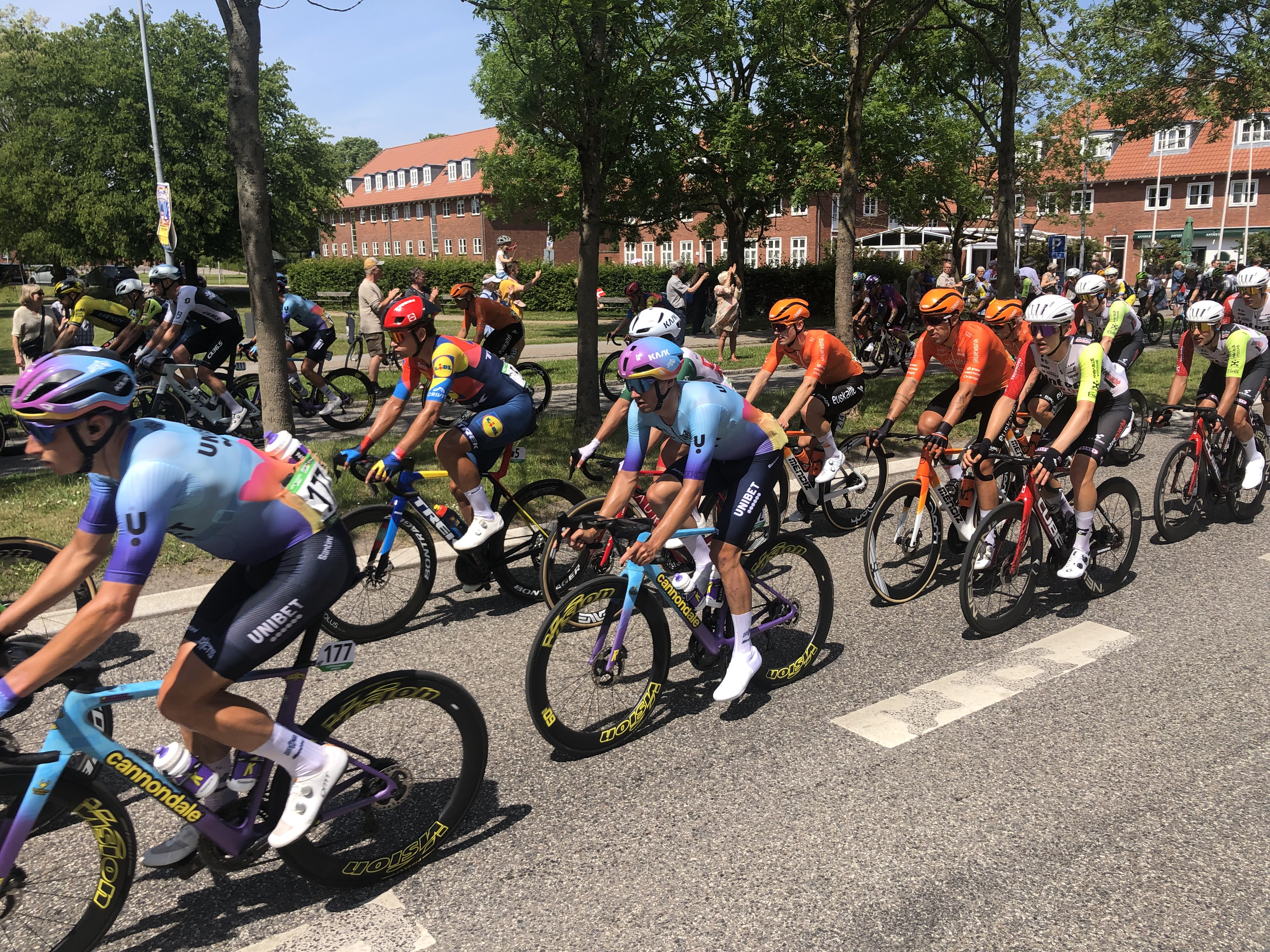
- The peloton passing through Humlebæk north of Copenhagen

Race details
- Dates: 22 June 2025
- Distance: 235.7 km (146.5 mi)
- Winning time: 5h 01' 15"

Results
	Winner	Jordi Meeus (BEL)	(Red Bull–Bora–Hansgrohe)
	Second	Alexis Renard (FRA)	(Cofidis)
	Third	Emilien Jeannière (FRA)	(Team TotalEnergies)

The 2025 Copenhagen Sprint was a Danish road cycling one-day race that took place on 22 June. It was the first edition for men of the Copenhagen Sprint and the 25th event of the 2025 UCI World Tour. The race was held the day after the inaugural women's Copenhagen Sprint. Belgian rider Jordi Meeus of Red Bull–Bora–Hansgrohe won the race in a sprint finish.

== Teams ==
Ten UCI WorldTeams, thirteen UCI ProTeams and the Danish national team took part in the race, for a total of 24 teams and 166 riders.

UCI WorldTeams

- Lidl–Trek
- Visma–Lease a Bike
- Alpecin–Deceuninck
- Red Bull–Bora–Hansgrohe
- Team Bahrain Victorious
- Cofidis
- Intermarché–Wanty
- Team Jayco–AlUla
- Arkéa–B&B Hotels
- Team Picnic–PostNL

UCI ProTeams

- Uno-X Mobility
- Israel–Premier Tech
- Tudor Pro Cycling Team
- Q36.5 Pro Cycling Team
- Team TotalEnergies
- Lotto
- Caja Rural–Seguros RGA
- Unibet Tietema Rockets
- Burgos Burpellet BH
- Team Solution Tech–Vini Fantini
- Team Polti VisitMalta
- Euskaltel–Euskadi
- Team Flanders–Baloise

National teams

- Denmark

== Course ==
The race took place over 235.7 kilometres (146.5 mi), starting at the Viking Ship Museum in Roskilde, before heading into Zealand and passing Frederikssund, Hillerød, Humlebæk and Ballerup. The route then entered Copenhagen for five laps of a 10 kilometres (6.2 mi) finishing circuit in the city centre. The race finished outside the National Gallery of Denmark, in Østre Anlæg park.

== Result ==
Result
Rank	Rider	Team	Time
1	Jordi Meeus (BEL)	Red Bull–Bora–Hansgrohe	5h 01' 15"
2	Alexis Renard (FRA)	Cofidis	+ 0"
3	Emilien Jeannière (FRA)	Team TotalEnergies	+ 0"
4	Arnaud Démare (FRA)	Arkéa–B&B Hotels	+ 0"
5	Tobias Lund Andresen (DEN)	Team Picnic–PostNL	+ 0"
6	Hugo Page (FRA)	Intermarché–Wanty	+ 0"
7	Dylan Groenewegen (NED)	Team Jayco–AlUla	+ 0"
8	Phil Bauhaus (GER)	Team Bahrain Victorious	+ 0"
9	Stanisław Aniołkowski (POL)	Cofidis	+ 0"
10	Søren Wærenskjold (NOR)	Uno-X Mobility	+ 0"
