= 2025 Cadel Evans Great Ocean Road Race =

Cycling race

2025 UCI World Tour, race 2 of 36

Race details
- Dates: 2 February 2025
- Stages: 1
- Distance: 183.8 km (114.2 mi)
- Winning time: 4h 26' 07"

Results
	Winner	Mauro Schmid (SUI)	(Team Jayco–AlUla)
	Second	Aaron Gate (NZL)	(XDS Astana Team)
	Third	Laurence Pithie (NZL)	(Red Bull–Bora–Hansgrohe)

The 2025 Cadel Evans Great Ocean Road Race was a road cycling race that was held on 2 February in Geelong, Australia. It was the ninth edition of the Cadel Evans Great Ocean Road Race and the second event of the 2025 UCI World Tour. It was won by Swiss rider Mauro Schmid of Team Jayco–AlUla after a solo attack in the closing stages of the race.

== Teams ==
Fourteen teams entered the race, including twelve of the eighteen UCI WorldTeams, one UCI ProTeam, and one national team.

UCI WorldTeams

- Cofidis
- EF Education–EasyPost
- Groupama–FDJ
- INEOS Grenadiers
- Intermarché–Wanty
- Lidl–Trek
- Movistar Team
- Red Bull–Bora–Hansgrohe
- Soudal–Quick-Step
- Team Jayco–AlUla
- Team Picnic–PostNL
- XDS Astana Team

UCI ProTeams

- Israel–Premier Tech

National Teams

- Australia

== Result ==
Result
Rank	Rider	Team	Time
1	Mauro Schmid (SUI)	Team Jayco–AlUla	4h 26' 07"
2	Aaron Gate (NZL)	XDS Astana Team	+ 3"
3	Laurence Pithie (NZL)	Red Bull–Bora–Hansgrohe	+ 3"
4	Javier Romo (ESP)	Movistar Team	+ 3"
5	Andrea Bagioli (ITA)	Lidl–Trek	+ 3"
6	Corbin Strong (NZL)	Israel–Premier Tech	+ 3"
7	Magnus Sheffield (USA)	INEOS Grenadiers	+ 3"
8	Rémy Rochas (FRA)	Groupama–FDJ	+ 3"
9	Oscar Onley (GBR)	Team Picnic–PostNL	+ 3"
10	Finn Fisher-Black (NZL)	Red Bull–Bora–Hansgrohe	+ 8"
