= 2025 Eschborn–Frankfurt =

One-day cycling race in Germany

2025 UCI World Tour, race 21 of 36

Race details
- Dates: 1 May 2025
- Stages: 1
- Distance: 198.7 km (123.5 mi)
- Winning time: 4h 38' 33"

Results
	Winner	Michael Matthews (AUS)	(Team Jayco–AlUla)
	Second	Magnus Cort (DEN)	(Uno-X Mobility)
	Third	Jon Barrenetxea (ESP)	(Movistar Team)

The 2025 Eschborn–Frankfurt was a road cycling one-day race that took place on 1 May 2025 in the Frankfurt Rhein-Main metro area in southwest Germany. It was the 62nd edition of Eschborn–Frankfurt and the 21st event of the 2025 UCI World Tour.

== Teams ==
14 of the 18 UCI WorldTeams and four UCI ProTeams made up the eighteen teams that participated in the race.

UCI WorldTeams

- Alpecin–Deceuninck
- Arkéa–B&B Hotels
- Cofidis
- EF Education–EasyPost
- Intermarché–Wanty
- Lidl–Trek
- Movistar Team
- Red Bull–Bora–Hansgrohe
- Soudal–Quick-Step
- Team Bahrain Victorious
- Team Jayco–AlUla
- Team Picnic–PostNL
- UAE Team Emirates XRG
- XDS Astana Team

UCI ProTeams

- Israel–Premier Tech
- Q36.5 Pro Cycling Team
- Tudor Pro Cycling Team
- Uno-X Mobility

== Result ==
Result
Rank	Rider	Team	Time
1	Michael Matthews (AUS)	Team Jayco–AlUla	4h 38' 33"
2	Magnus Cort (DEN)	Uno-X Mobility	+ 0"
3	Jon Barrenetxea (ESP)	Movistar Team	+ 0"
4	Neilson Powless (USA)	EF Education–EasyPost	+ 0"
5	Frederik Wandahl (DEN)	Red Bull–Bora–Hansgrohe	+ 0"
6	Albert Withen Philipsen (DEN)	Lidl–Trek	+ 0"
7	Stefano Oldani (ITA)	Cofidis	+ 0"
8	Marc Hirschi (SUI)	Tudor Pro Cycling Team	+ 0"
9	Nico Denz (GER)	Red Bull–Bora–Hansgrohe	+ 0"
10	Warren Barguil (FRA)	Team Picnic–PostNL	+ 0"
