= Copenhagen Sprint =

Danish one-day road cycling race

Race details
- Date: June
- Region: Copenhagen, Denmark
- Discipline: Road
- Competition: UCI World Tour; UCI Women's World Tour
- Type: One-day
- Web site: copenhagensprint.com

History (men)
- First edition: 2025
- First winner: Jordi Meeus (BEL)
- Most wins: No repeat winner
- Most recent: Jasper Philipsen (BEL)

History (women)
- First edition: 2025
- First winner: Lorena Wiebes (NED)
- Most wins: Lorena Wiebes (NED) (2 wins)
- Most recent: Lorena Wiebes (NED)

The Copenhagen Sprint is a pair of professional cycle races held in Denmark for men and women as part of the UCI World Tour and UCI Women's World Tour, respectively. The race is held on Zealand, the most populous island of Denmark, with a finish in Copenhagen.

== History ==
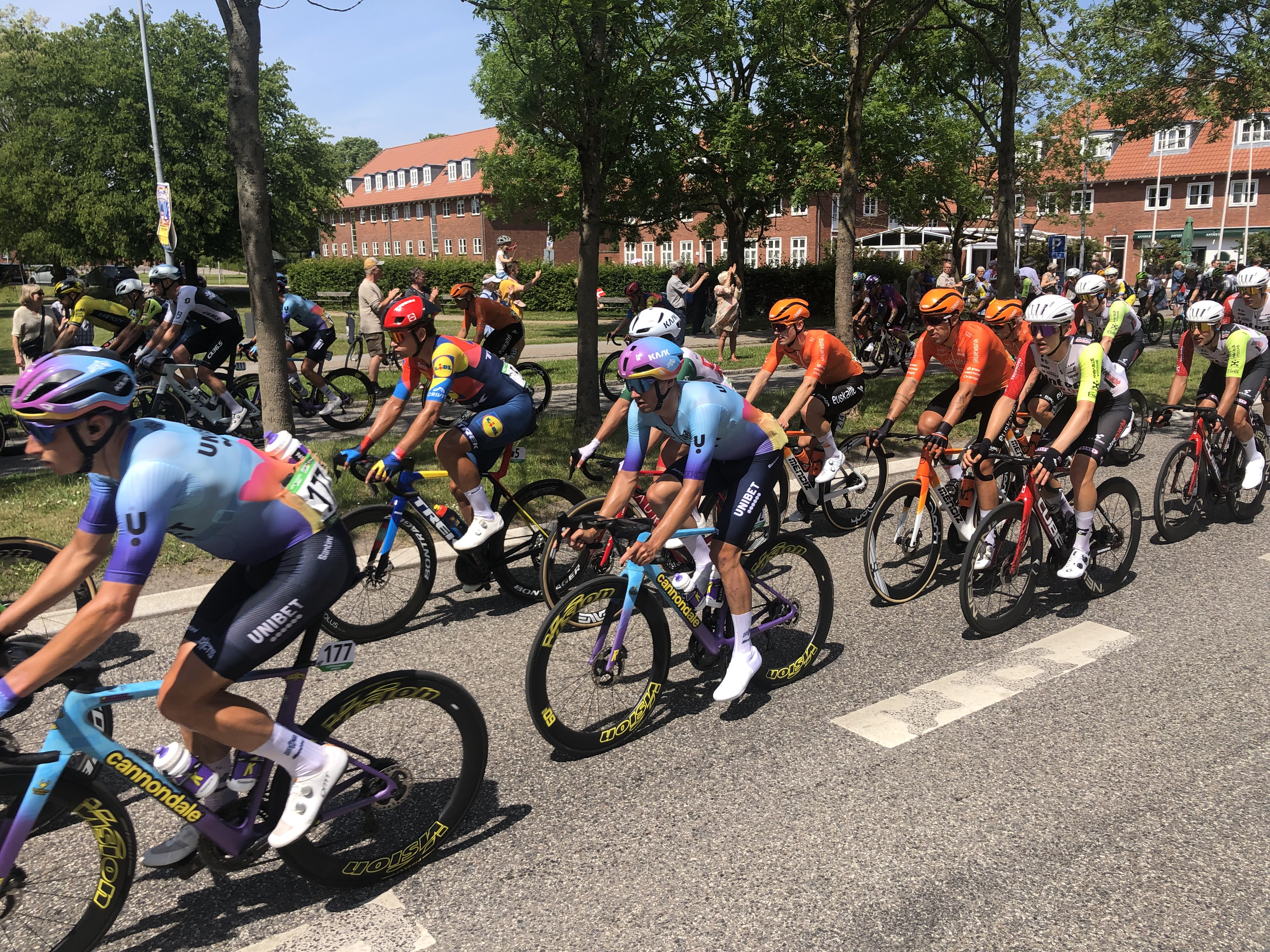
Men's peloton in Humlebæk, 2025

The race was initially announced in December 2023, with the organisers hoping that the race would be held from 2025 for both men and women. On 17 June 2024, the race and the proposed route were launched. Organisers noted that the race would be designed for sprinters, given the flat landscape of Denmark. The race has been funded by the City of Copenhagen, the Danish Government, Sport Event Denmark and Roskilde Municipality at a cost in its first year of DKK 71.5 million (EUR 9.59 million).

In October 2024, it was confirmed that the race would be part of the UCI World Tour and UCI Women's World Tour calendars, with the first event to be held in June 2025.

The first races took place in June 2025, with organisers announcing prior that an equal amount of prize money (€40,000) would be awarded to the race winners, which drew praise from riders in the women's peloton. Both of the inaugural races finished in a sprint, with the women's race being won by Lorena Wiebes and the men's race by Jordi Meeus.

== Course ==
The race uses a course that starts in Roskilde, then passes through the Zealand region before entering Copenhagen for laps of a 10-kilometre (6.2 mi) finishing circuit in the city centre.

In 2025, the women's race took place over 160 kilometres (99 mi), with 3 laps of the finishing circuit. The men's race took place over 230 kilometres (140 mi), with 5 laps of the finishing circuit.

== Winners ==
=== Men's race ===
Year	Rider	Team
2025	(Belgium) Jordi Meeus	Red Bull–Bora–Hansgrohe
2026	(Belgium) Jasper Philipsen	Alpecin–Premier Tech

=== Women's race ===
Year	Rider	Team
2025	(Netherlands) Lorena Wiebes	Team SD Worx–Protime
2026	(Netherlands) Lorena Wiebes	Team SD Worx–Protime
