= Victor Langellotti =

Monegasque cyclist (born 1995)

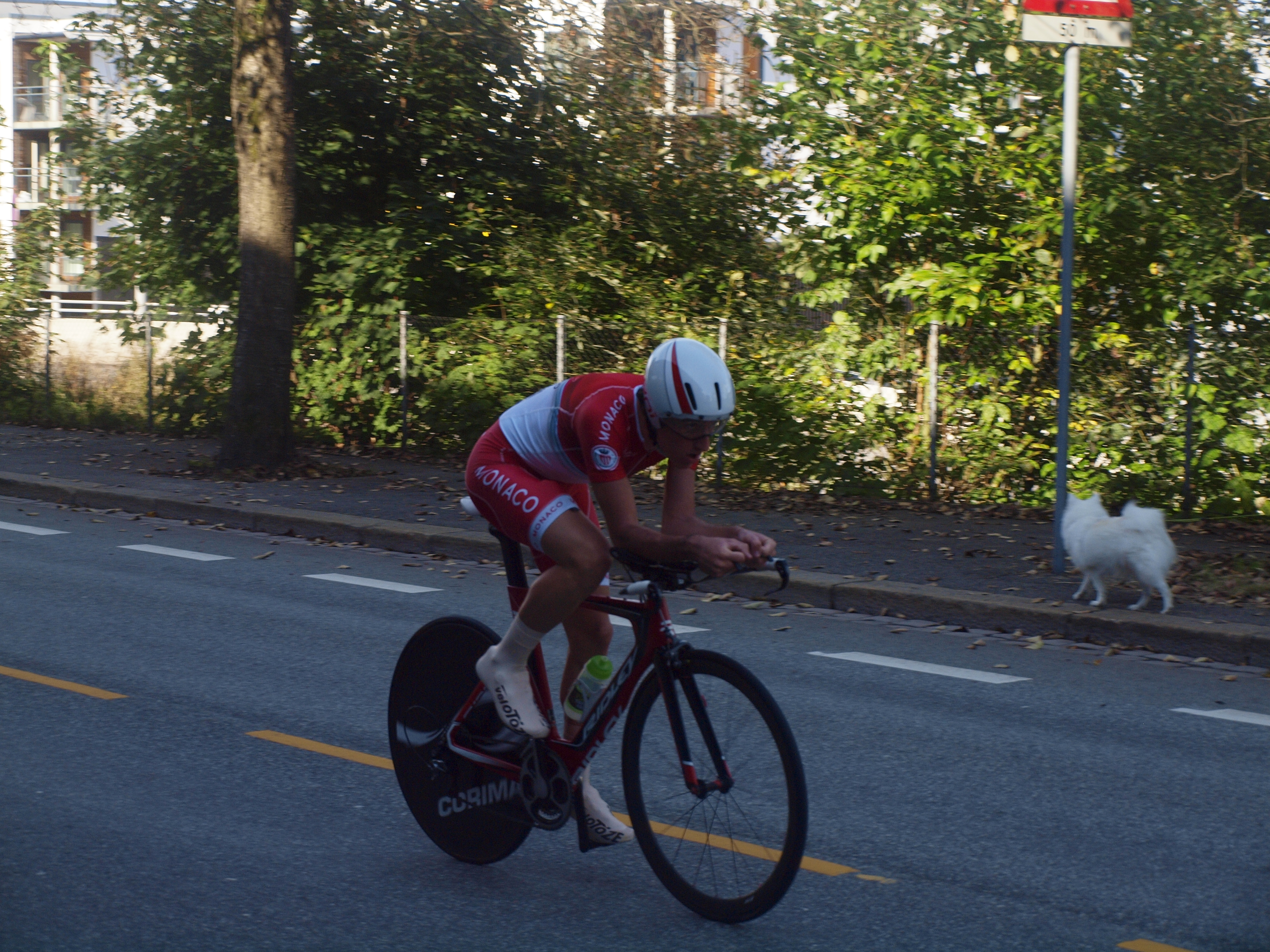
- Langellotti in 2017

Personal information
- Born: 7 June 1995 (age 31) Monaco
- Height: 1.77 m (5 ft 10 in)
- Weight: 64 kg (141 lb)

Cycling career
- Sport: Cycling
- Current team: XDS Astana Team
- Discipline: Road
- Role: Rider
- Rider type: Puncheur

Amateur team
- 2014–2017: UC Monaco

Professional teams
- 2018–2024: Burgos BH
- 2025–2026: INEOS Grenadiers
- 2026–: XDS Astana Team
Medal record
Men's road cycling
Representing Monaco
Games of the Small States of Europe
| Silver medal – second place | 2017 San Marino | Time trial |

Victor Langellotti (born 7 June 1995 in Monaco) is a Monegasque cyclist, who since 2025 rides for UCI WorldTeam Netcompany–Ineos.

== Major results ==
2017
2nd Time trial, Games of the Small States of Europe
2022 (1 pro win)
1st Stage 8 Volta a Portugal
Vuelta a España

Held after Stages 5–7

2023 (1)
1st Stage 6 Tour of Turkey
8th Tour du Doubs
9th Clàssica Comunitat Valenciana 1969
2024
2nd Classic Grand Besançon Doubs
6th Tour du Jura
10th Overall Tour of Turkey
2025 (1)
2nd Overall Tour of Norway
5th Overall Tour de Pologne

1st Stage 6

9th Overall Four Days of Dunkirk
2026
National Road Championships

1st Road race
1st Time trial

=== Grand Tour general classification results timeline ===
| Grand Tour | 2022 | 2023 | 2024 | 2025 | 2026 |
|---|---|---|---|---|---|
| Giro d'Italia | — | — | — | — | — |
| Tour de France | — | — | — | — | — |
| Vuelta a España | DNF | — | — | 59 | |

Legend
| — | Did not compete |
| DNF | Did not finish |
