= Peter Øxenberg =

Danish cyclist (born 2005)

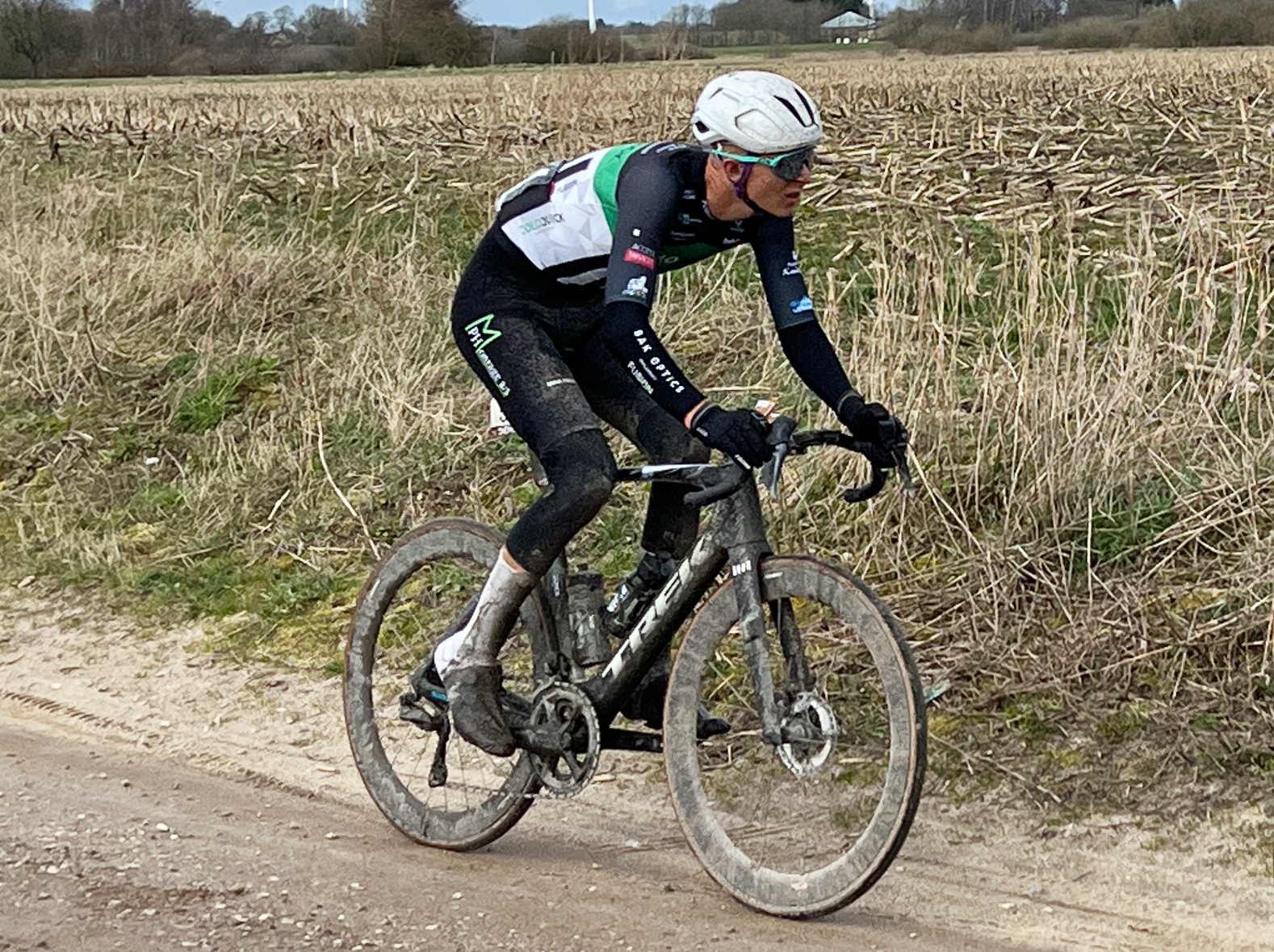
- Øxenberg in 2024

Personal information
- Full name: Peter Øxenberg Hansen
- Born: 23 October 2005 (age 20) Nørreby, Nordfyn Municipality, Denmark
- Height: 1.91 m (6 ft 3 in)
- Weight: 69 kg (152 lb)

Cycling career
- Sport: Cycling
- Current team: Netcompany–Ineos
- Discipline: Road
- Role: Rider

Amateur teams
- 2021–2022: Team Odense
- 2023: Team Vifra Kvickly Odder Junior

Professional teams
- 2024: Team ColoQuick
- 2025: Team Lotto–Kern Haus PSD Bank
- 2025–: INEOS Grenadiers

Peter Øxenberg Hansen (born 23 October 2005) is a Danish cyclist, who currently rides for UCI WorldTeam Netcompany–Ineos.

== Major results ==
2023
1st Overall Acht van Bladel
6th Liège–Bastogne–Liège Juniors
2024
1st Stage 4 Orlen Nations Grand Prix
2nd Eschborn–Frankfurt Under-23
5th Sundvolden GP
2025
5th Overall Grand Prix Jeseníky
6th Giro del Belvedere
9th Overall Tour de l'Avenir
2026
2nd Overall Alpes Isère Tour

1st Stage 5

3rd Time trial, National Road Championships
