= Ben Turner (cyclist) =

British cyclist

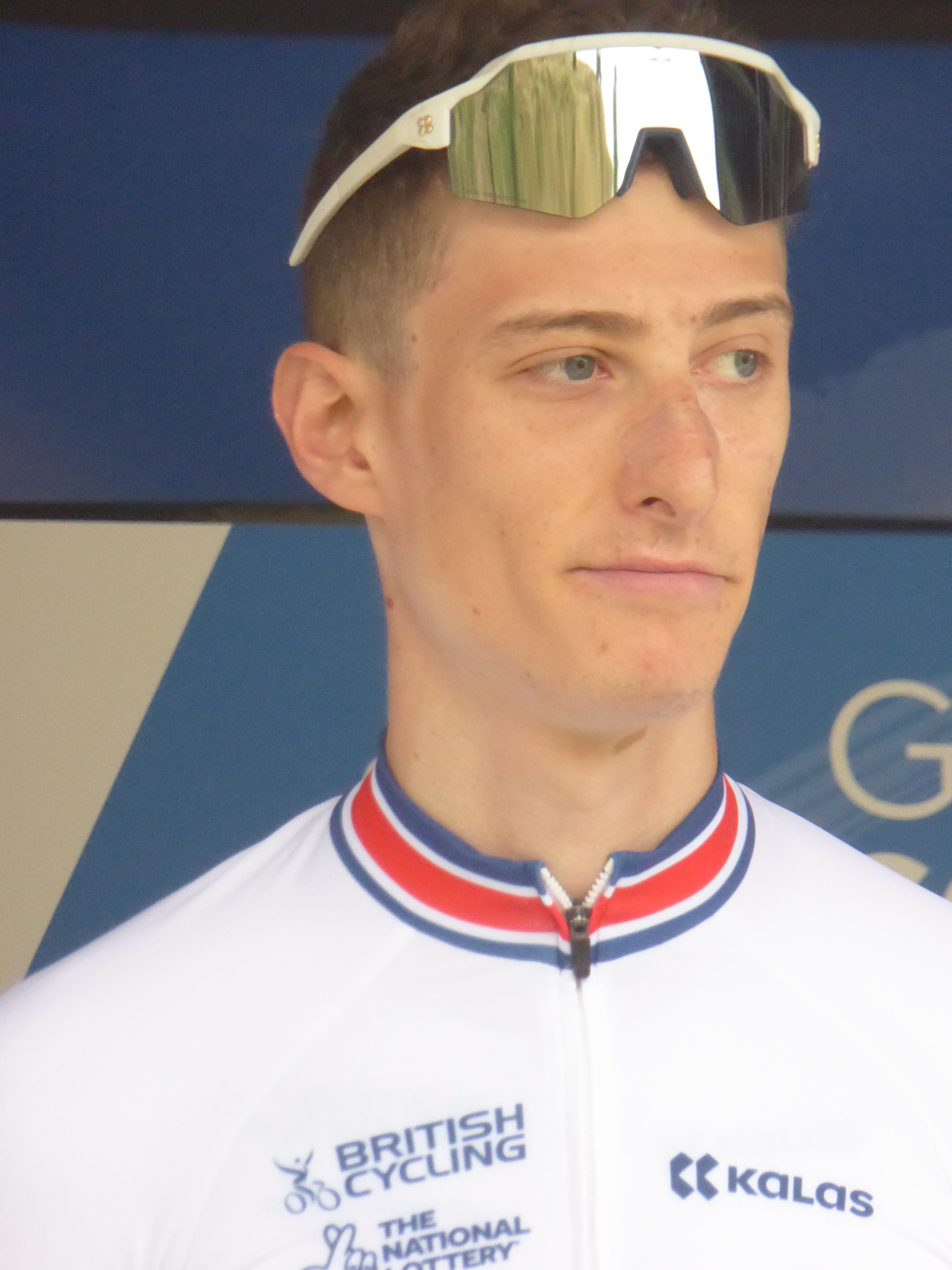
- Turner in 2023

Personal information
- Full name: Benjamin Elliott Turner
- Nickname: The Clock
- Born: 28 May 1999 (age 27) Doncaster, United Kingdom
- Height: 1.94 m (6 ft 4 1/2 in)
- Weight: 74 kg (163 lb; 11 st 9 lb)

Cycling career
- Sport: Cycling
- Current team: Netcompany–Ineos
- Disciplines: Cyclo-cross; Road
- Role: Rider
- Rider type: Rouleur; Classics specialist

Amateur teams
- 2012: Doncaster Wheelers Cycling Club
- 2013: Dinnington Racing Club
- 2014–2016: Paul Milnes–Bradford Olympic RC
- 2017: HMT Hospitals Giant Cycling Team
- 2019–2020: IKO–Beobank (road)

Professional teams
- 2017–2019: Beobank–Corendon (cyclo-cross)
- 2019–2020: Creafin–Fristads (cyclo-cross)
- 2020–2021: Trinity Racing
- 2022–: INEOS Grenadiers

Major wins
- Grand Tours Vuelta a España 1 individual stage (2025)
Medal record
Representing Great Britain
Men's cyclo-cross
World Championships
Bronze medal – third place	2017 Bieles	Junior

Benjamin Elliott Turner (born 28 May 1999) is a British cyclist, who currently rides for UCI WorldTeam Netcompany–Ineos.

== Career ==
In 2021, Turner competed in cyclo-cross and road racing for UCI team Trinity Racing.

=== Ineos Grenadiers ===
On 2 November 2021, it was announced Turner had signed for UCI WorldTeam INEOS Grenadiers on a two-year contract. His first race with the team was the Vuelta a Andalucía his role was being a Domestique for Carlos Rodríguez who ended up finishing fourth overall. In stage 3, Turner finished fourth after leading out teammate Magnus Sheffield to victory.

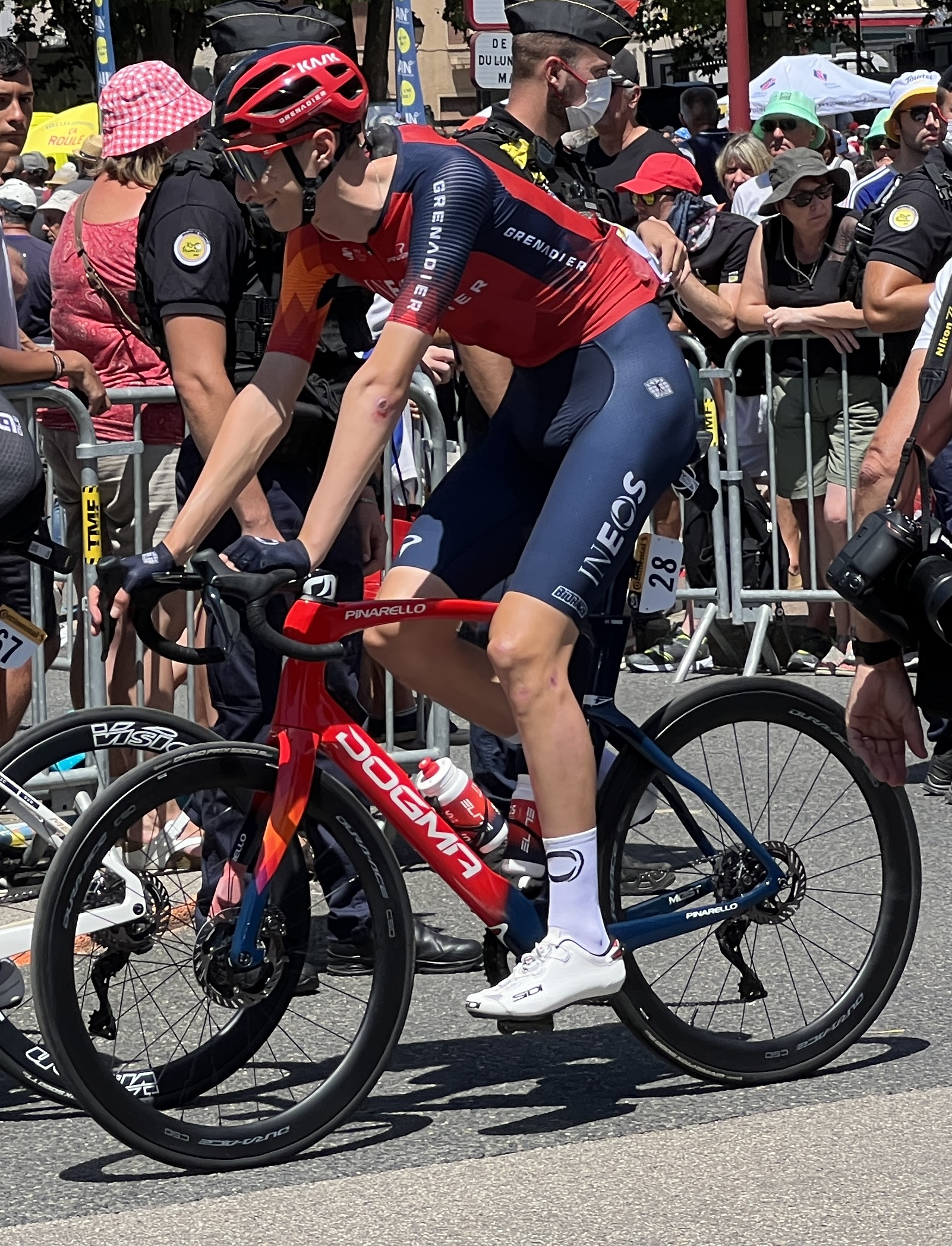
Turner at the 2023 Tour de France

His next set of races were the Cobbled classics where once again he was in a domestique role. In the Grand Prix de Denain Turner was part of a five man breakaway with teammates Jhonatan Narváez and Sheffield who attacked with 30 km to go but sadly were caught by the peloton with 2 km to go, with Turner finishing in 41st position. Gent–Wevelgem was the next race where Turner showed his good form. He managed 28th which was the best placed from his team after spending the day working for Dylan van Baarle who finished in 41st, 17 seconds behind Turner. Turner made the decisive 11-man group with leader Tom Pidcock also there. His work as a domestique chasing down attacks helped Pidcock finish in 3rd position and Turner was able to hold on to finish in 8th, his first top 10 One-day result. Another strong performance by Turner, at the Brabantse Pijl, after working once again as a domestique this time for Sheffield he crossed the line in 4th out sprinting teammate Pidcock and his other 5 breakaway companions. 35 km into Paris–Roubaix the bunch was met with cross-winds so Turner went to the front with his Ineos squad and begin to increase the pace, this caused a split with many favourites missing out. By 67 km to go the race was mostly together again except for a few riders out in front. Team Jumbo–Visma came to the front to drive the pace in doing so caused a split which Turner and teammate van Baarle were a part of. Turner unfortunately crashed on a cobble sector and lost contact with the front bunch. He did manage to keep riding finishing in 11th 4' 30" down on winner Dylan van Baarle.

He rode in the 2025 Vuelta, where he won stage 4 in an uphill sprint finish to notch his first stage win in a Grand Tour.

== Major results ==
=== Cyclo-cross ===
2016–2017
1st Junior Boom
2nd National Junior Championships
UCI Junior World Cup

2nd Hoogerheide

Junior DVV Trophy

2nd Hamme

Junior Brico Cross

2nd Bredene

2nd Junior Sint-Niklaas
3rd UCI World Junior Championships
2017–2018
2nd National Under-23 Championships
3rd Under-23 Overijse
2018–2019
Under-23 DVV Trophy

1st Niel
1st Loenhout
1st Baal
3rd Koppenberg
3rd Lille

2nd National Championships
2nd Overall Under-23 Superprestige
UCI Under-23 World Cup

3rd Hoogerheide
4th Koksijde

4th UEC European Under-23 Championships
2019–2020
3rd National Under-23 Championships
3rd Overall Under-23 Superprestige
UCI Under-23 World Cup

5th Bern

2020–2021
UCI Under-23 World Cup

2nd Tábor

=== Road ===
2021
2nd Time trial, National Under-23 Championships
7th Overall Tour d'Eure-et-Loir
2022
4th Road race, National Championships
4th Brabantse Pijl
5th Overall ZLM Toer
7th Road race, Commonwealth Games
8th Dwars door Vlaanderen
2023 (1 pro win)
1st Vuelta a Murcia
2nd Clásica Jaén Paraíso Interior
2024
7th Overall Renewi Tour
2025 (2)
Tour de Pologne

1st Points classification
1st Stage 3

1st Stage 4 Vuelta a España
2026
8th Overall Volta a la Comunitat Valenciana

==== Grand Tour general classification results timeline ====
Grand Tour	2022	2023	2024	2025
Giro d'Italia	—	—	—	120
Tour de France	—	DNF	115	—
Vuelta a España	72	—	—	127

Legend
—	Did not compete
DNF	Did not finish
