= Paul Double =

British cyclist (born 1996)

Personal information
- Born: 25 June 1996 (age 30) Winchester, England
- Height: 1.71 m (5 ft 7 in)
- Weight: 56 kg (123 lb; 8 st 11 lb)

Cycling career
- Sport: Cycling
- Current team: Team Jayco–AlUla
- Discipline: Road
- Role: Rider
- Rider type: Climber

Amateur teams
- 2017–2018: Zappi Racing Team
- 2020: Holdsworth Zappi Racing Team

Professional teams
- 2019: Team Colpack
- 2021–2022: MG.K Vis VPM
- 2022: Human Powered Health (stagiaire)
- 2023: Human Powered Health
- 2024: Polti–Kometa
- 2025–: Team Jayco–AlUla

Major wins
- Stage races Tour of Guangxi (2025)

Paul Double (born 25 June 1996) is a British racing cyclist, who currently rides for UCI WorldTeam Team Jayco–AlUla. He won the final stage, and the overall classification, of the 2025 Okolo Slovenska.

== Major results ==
2018
10th Trofeo Città di San Vendemiano
2020
4th Overall Tour of Bulgaria
2021
7th Overall Settimana Ciclistica Italiana
9th Trofeo Alcide Degasperi
2022
1st Stage 2 Tour of Bulgaria
6th Overall International Tour of Hellas
6th Giro dell'Appennino
7th Overall Tour of Slovenia
8th Giro della Toscana
9th Overall Adriatica Ionica Race
2023
6th Overall Tour de Langkawi
8th Overall Tour of Slovenia
2024
3rd Overall Tour of Turkey
6th Overall Tour of Slovenia
7th Overall Giro d'Abruzzo
7th Giro dell'Appennino
2025 (5 pro wins)
1st Overall Tour of Guangxi

1st Stage 5

1st Overall Okolo Slovenska

1st Stage 5

1st Stage 2 Settimana Internazionale di Coppi e Bartali
2026
5th Overall Tour of Oman
5th Overall Tour of Austria

=== Grand Tour general classification results timeline ===
Grand Tour	2025
Giro d'Italia	98
Tour de France	—
Vuelta a España	—

Legend
—	Did not compete
DNF	Did not finish
