= 2023 Team Jayco–AlUla (men's team) season =

Team Jayco–AlUla
- 2023 season
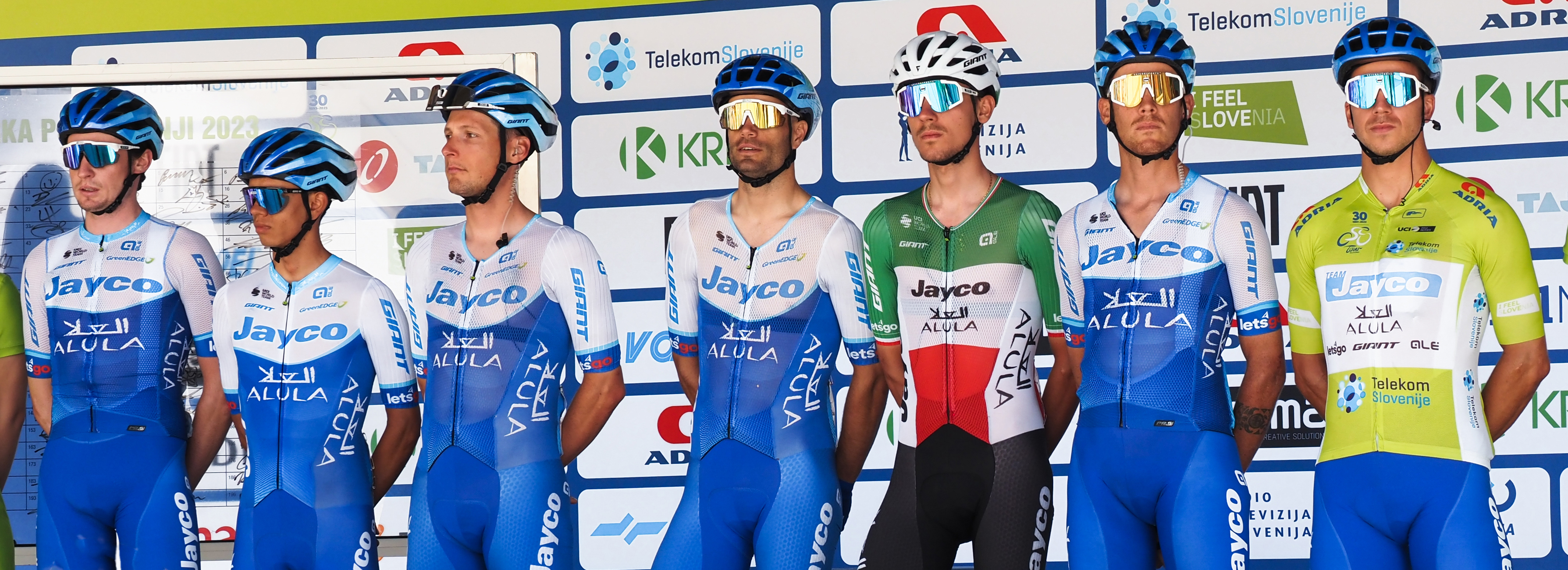
- Team Jayco AlUla at the 2023 Tour of Slovenia
- UCI code: JAY
- Status: UCI WorldTeam
- Owner: Gerry Ryan
- Manager: Brent Copeland (RSA)
- Main sponsor(s): Jayco; City of Al-'Ula
- Based: Australia
- Bicycles: Giant
- Groupset: Shimano

Season victories
- One-day races: 2
- Stage race overall: 1
- Stage race stages: 9

The 2023 season for the Team Jayco–AlUla team is the team's 12th season in existence, all of which have been as a UCI WorldTeam.

American recreational vehicle manufacturer Jayco became a main title sponsor with Saudi city Al-'Ula joining as a new co-title sponsor.

== Team roster ==
As of 13 January 2023.

Rider	Date of birth
Alexandre Balmer (SUI)	4 May 2000 (aged 22)
Welay Berhe (ETH)	22 October 2001 (aged 21)
Kevin Colleoni (ITA)	11 November 1999 (aged 23)
Lawson Craddock (USA)	20 February 1992 (aged 30)
Alessandro De Marchi (ITA)	19 May 1986 (aged 36)
Eddie Dunbar (IRL)	1 September 1996 (aged 26)
Luke Durbridge (AUS)	9 April 1991 (aged 31)
Felix Engelhardt (GER)	19 August 2000 (aged 22)
Tsgabu Grmay (ETH)	25 August 1991 (aged 31)
Dylan Groenewegen (NED)	21 June 1993 (aged 29)
Lucas Hamilton (AUS)	12 February 1996 (aged 26)
Chris Harper (AUS)	23 November 1994 (aged 28)
Michael Hepburn (AUS)	17 August 1991 (aged 31)
Amund Grøndahl Jansen (NOR)	11 February 1994 (aged 28)
Christopher Juul-Jensen (DEN)	6 July 1989 (aged 33)

Rider	Date of birth
Jan Maas (NED)	19 February 1996 (aged 26)
Michael Matthews (AUS)	26 September 1990 (aged 32)
Luka Mezgec (SLO)	27 June 1988 (aged 34)
Kelland O'Brien (AUS)	22 May 1998 (aged 24)
Jesús David Peña (COL)	8 May 2000 (aged 22)
Rudy Porter (AUS)	15 December 2000 (aged 22)
Lukas Pöstlberger (AUT)	10 January 1992 (aged 30)
Blake Quick (AUS)	26 February 2000 (aged 22)
Elmar Reinders (NED)	14 March 1992 (aged 30)
Callum Scotson (AUS)	10 August 1996 (aged 26)
Matteo Sobrero (ITA)	14 May 1997 (aged 25)
Campbell Stewart (NZL)	12 May 1998 (aged 24)
Zdeněk Štybar (CZE)	11 December 1985 (aged 37)
Simon Yates (GBR)	7 August 1992 (aged 30)
Filippo Zana (ITA)	18 March 1999 (aged 23)

Riders who joined the team for the 2023 season

Rider	2022 team
Welay Berhe	neo-pro (EF Education–Nippo)
Alessandro De Marchi	Israel–Premier Tech
Eddie Dunbar	Ineos Grenadiers
Felix Engelhardt	neo-pro (Tirol KTM Cycling Team)
Chris Harper	Team Jumbo–Visma
Rudy Porter	neo-pro (Trinity Racing)
Lukas Pöstlberger	Bora–Hansgrohe
Blake Quick	neo-pro (Trinity Racing)
Zdeněk Štybar	Quick-Step Alpha Vinyl Team
Filippo Zana	Bardiani–CSF–Faizanè

Riders who left the team during or after the 2022 season

Rider	2023 team
Jack Bauer	Q36.5 Pro Cycling Team
Sam Bewley	Retired
Alex Edmondson	Team dsm–firmenich
Damien Howson	Q36.5 Pro Cycling Team
Tanel Kangert	Retired
Alexander Konychev	Team Corratec
Cameron Meyer	Retired
Nick Schultz	Israel–Premier Tech
Dion Smith	Intermarché–Circus–Wanty

== Season victories ==
Date	Race	Competition	Rider	Country	Location	Ref.
22 January	Tour Down Under, Stage 5	UCI World Tour	Simon Yates (GBR)	Australia	Mount Lofty	
22 January	Tour Down Under, Points classification	UCI World Tour	Michael Matthews (AUS)	Australia		
30 January	Saudi Tour, Stage 1	UCI Asia Tour	Dylan Groenewegen (NED)	Saudi Arabia	Khaybar	
3 February	Saudi Tour, Points classification	UCI Asia Tour	Dylan Groenewegen (NED)	Saudi Arabia		
24 February	UAE Tour, Stage 5	UCI World Tour	Dylan Groenewegen (NED)	United Arab Emirates	Umm Al Quwain	
12 March	Paris–Nice, Team classification	UCI World Tour	(Note: The riders in the squad were Luke Durbridge, Lucas Hamilton, Chris Harper, Michael Matthews, Kelland O'Brien, Matteo Sobrero, and Simon Yates.)	France		
19 March	Per sempre Alfredo	UCI Europe Tour	Felix Engelhardt (GER)	Italy	Sesto Fiorentino	
8 May	Giro d'Italia, Stage 3	UCI World Tour	Michael Matthews (AUS)	Italy	Melfi	
10 May	Tour de Hongrie, Stage 1	UCI ProSeries	Dylan Groenewegen (NED)	Hungary	Szentgotthárd	
20 May	Veenendaal–Veenendaal Classic	UCI Europe Tour	Dylan Groenewegen (NED)	Netherlands	Veenendaal	
25 May	Giro d'Italia, Stage 18	UCI World Tour	Filippo Zana (ITA)	Italy	Zoldo Alto	
14 June	Tour of Slovenia, Stage 1	UCI ProSeries	Dylan Groenewegen (NED)	Slovenia	Rogaška Slatina	
15 June	Tour of Slovenia, Stage 2	UCI ProSeries	Dylan Groenewegen (NED)	Slovenia	Ormož	
17 June	Tour of Slovenia, Stage 4	UCI ProSeries	Jesús David Peña (COL)	Slovenia	Kobarid	
18 June	Tour of Slovenia, Overall	UCI ProSeries	Filippo Zana (ITA)	Slovenia		
5 July	Tour of Austria, Stage 4	UCI Europe Tour	Matteo Sobrero (ITA)	Austria	Steyr	
6 July	Tour of Austria, Young rider classification	UCI Europe Tour	Jesús David Peña (COL)	Austria		
6 July	Tour of Austria, Team classification	UCI Europe Tour	(Note: The riders in the squad were Welay Berhe, Felix Engelhardt, Lucas Hamilton, Jesús David Peña, Rudy Porter, Lukas Pöstlberger, and Matteo Sobrero.)	Austria		
26 July	Vuelta a Castilla y León, Stage 1	UCI Europe Tour	Felix Engelhardt (GER)	Spain	Soria	
27 July	Vuelta a Castilla y León, Points classification	UCI Europe Tour	Felix Engelhardt (GER)	Spain		
1 October	CRO Race, Stage 6	UCI Europe Tour	Campbell Stewart (AUS)	Croatia	Zagreb	
22 October	Hong Kong Challenge	UCI Asia Tour	Lukas Pöstlberger (AUT)	Hong Kong	Hong Kong	

== National, Continental, and World Champions ==
Date	Discipline	Jersey	Rider	Country	Location	Ref.
22 June	Ethiopia National Time Trial Championships		Tsgabu Grmay (ETH)	Ethiopia		
