= List of wins by GreenEDGE and its successors =

This is a comprehensive list of victories of the Team Jayco–AlUla cycling team. The races are categorized according to the UCI Continental Circuits rules.

== 2012 – GreenEDGE Cycling / Orica–GreenEDGE ==
Australia Road Race Championships, Simon Gerrans
Eritrea Road Race Championships, Daniel Teklehaimanot
Australia Time Trial Championships, Luke Durbridge
Canada Time Trial Championships, Svein Tuft
Eritrea Time Trial Championships, Daniel Teklehaimanot
Overall Tour Down Under, Simon Gerrans
Stage 1 Tirreno–Adriatico, Team time trial
Milan – San Remo, Simon Gerrans
Overall Volta a Catalunya, Michael Albasini

Stages 1 & 2, Michael Albasini

Stage 2 Tour of the Basque Country, Daryl Impey
Overall Circuit de la Sarthe, Luke Durbridge

Stage 3 (ITT), Luke Durbridge

Stage 3 Giro d'Italia, Matthew Goss
Stage 3 Tour of Norway, Aidis Kruopis
Prologue Critérium du Dauphiné, Luke Durbridge
Stage 2 Tour of Slovenia, Daryl Impey
Stage 8 Tour de Suisse, Michael Albasini
Stage 4 Tour de Pologne, Aidis Kruopis
Stage 2 Eneco Tour, Team time trial
Stage 6 (ITT) Eneco Tour, Svein Tuft
Overall Tour du Poitou-Charentes, Luke Durbridge

Stages 1 & 2, Aidis Kruopis
Stage 4 (ITT), Luke Durbridge

Mountains classification, Vuelta a España, Simon Clarke

Stage 4, Simon Clarke

Grand Prix Cycliste de Québec, Simon Gerrans
Stage 2 Tour of Britain, Leigh Howard
Duo Normand, Luke Durbridge & Svein Tuft
African Time Trial Daniel Teklehaymanot

== 2013 – Orica–GreenEDGE ==
Australia Road Race Championships, Luke Durbridge
Australia Time Trial Championships, Luke Durbridge
South Africa Time Trial Championships, Daryl Impey
Lithuania Road Race Championships, Tomas Vaitkus
Australian National Criterium, Cameron Meyer
Stage 4 (ITT) Tour de San Luis, Svein Tuft
Stage 5 Tour Down Under, Simon Gerrans
Trofeo Campos–Santanyí–Ses Salines, Leigh Howard
Trofeo Platja de Muro, Leigh Howard
Stage 4 Paris–Nice, Michael Albasini
Stage 2 Tirreno–Adriatico, Matthew Goss
Oceania Road Race Cameron Meyer
Stage 6 Volta a Catalunya, Simon Gerrans
Stage 1 Tour of the Basque Country, Simon Gerrans
Stage 2 Tour of the Basque Country, Daryl Impey
Stage 3 (ITT) Circuit de la Sarthe, Luke Durbridge
Stage 2 Tour of Turkey, Aidis Kruopis
Stage 2 Bayern-Rundfahrt, Daryl Impey
Grand Prix of Aargau Canton, Michael Albasini
Stage 1 (ITT) Tour de Suisse, Cameron Meyer
Stage 1 (ITT) Tour of Slovenia, Svein Tuft
Stage 4 Tour of Slovenia, Brett Lancaster
Stage 3 Tour de France, Simon Gerrans
Stage 4 Tour de France, Team time trial
Prueba Villafranca de Ordizia, Daniel Teklehaymanot
Overall Tour de Pologne, Pieter Weening
Stages 2 & 4 Tour of Utah, Michael Matthews
Stages 2 & 3 Vuelta a Burgos, Jens Keukeleire
Stages 5 & 21 Vuelta a España, Michael Matthews
Duo Normand, Luke Durbridge & Svein Tuft
African Time Trial Daniel Teklehaymanot

== 2014 – Orica–GreenEDGE ==
Australia Time Trial Championships, Michael Hepburn
Australia Road Race Championships, Simon Gerrans
South Africa Time Trial Championships, Daryl Impey
Canada Time Trial Championships, Svein Tuft
Canada Road Race Championships, Svein Tuft
Overall Tour Down Under, Simon Gerrans

Stage 1, Simon Gerrans

Overall Herald Sun Tour, Simon Clarke

Stage 2, Simon Clarke

Stage 3 (ITT) Tour of Qatar, Michael Hepburn
Oceania Road Race Luke Durbridge
Vuelta a La Rioja, Michael Matthews
Stage 3 Tour of the Basque Country, Michael Matthews
Liège–Bastogne–Liège, Simon Gerrans
Stages 1, 2 & 4 Tour de Romandie, Michael Albasini
Overall Tour of Turkey, Adam Yates

Stage 6, Adam Yates

Stage 1 Giro d'Italia, Team time trial
Stage 6 Giro d'Italia, Michael Matthews
Stage 6 Tour of California, Esteban Chaves
Stage 9 Giro d'Italia, Pieter Weening
Stage 3 Bayern-Rundfahrt, Daryl Impey
Stage 2 Tour de Suisse, Cameron Meyer
Stage 1 (ITT) Tour of Slovenia, Michael Matthews
Stage 8 Tour de Suisse, Esteban Chaves
GP Industria & Artigianato, Adam Yates
Giro della Toscana, Pieter Weening
Stage 3 Vuelta a España, Michael Matthews
Overall Tour of Alberta, Daryl Impey

Stage 5, Daryl Impey

Grand Prix Cycliste de Québec, Simon Gerrans
Grand Prix Cycliste de Montréal, Simon Gerrans
Tre Valli Varesine, Michael Albasini

== 2015 – Orica–GreenEDGE ==
South Africa Time Trial Championships, Daryl Impey
Overall Herald Sun Tour, Cameron Meyer

Stage 1, Cameron Meyer
Stages 2 & 3, Caleb Ewan

Oceania Time Trial Michael Hepburn
Stages 3 & 6 Tour de Langkawi, Caleb Ewan
Stage 3 Paris–Nice, Michael Matthews
Vuelta a La Rioja, Caleb Ewan
Stage 1 Tour of the Basque Country, Michael Matthews
Stages 2 & 3 Tour de Romandie, Michael Albasini
Stage 1 Giro d'Italia, Team time trial
Stage 3 Giro d'Italia, Michael Matthews
Overall Tour de Korea, Caleb Ewan

Stages 2, 3, 5 & 7, Caleb Ewan

Stage 4 Tour de Suisse, Michael Matthews
Clásica de San Sebastián, Adam Yates
Stage 2 & 6 Vuelta a España, Esteban Chaves
Stage 5 Vuelta a España, Caleb Ewan
Stage 2 Tour of Alberta, Michael Matthews
Overall Abu Dhabi Tour, Esteban Chaves

Stage 3, Esteban Chaves

== 2016 – Orica–GreenEDGE / Orica–BikeExchange ==
Australia National Criterium Championships, Caleb Ewan
People's Choice Classic, Caleb Ewan
Overall Tour Down Under, Simon Gerrans

Stages 1 & 6, Caleb Ewan
Stages 3 & 4, Simon Gerrans

Stage 2 Herald Sun Tour, Caleb Ewan
South Africa National Time Trial Championships, Daryl Impey
Prologue (ITT) & Stage 2 Paris–Nice, Michael Matthews
Vuelta Ciclista a La Rioja, Michael Matthews
Paris–Roubaix, Mathew Hayman
Stage 5 Tour de Romandie, Michael Albasini
Stage 14 Giro d'Italia, Esteban Chaves
Stage 1 Tour of Slovenia, Jens Keukeleire
Hong Kong Time Trial Championships, Cheung King Lok
Hong Kong Road Race Championships, Cheung King Lok
Stage 10 Tour de France, Michael Matthews
Young rider classification Tour de France, Adam Yates
Prueba Villafranca de Ordizia, Simon Yates
Vattenfall Cyclassics, Caleb Ewan
Stage 6 Vuelta a España, Simon Yates
Stage 12 Vuelta a España, Jens Keukeleire
Stages 18 & 21 Vuelta a España, Magnus Cort Nielsen
Stage 8 Tour of Britain, Caleb Ewan
Giro dell'Emilia, Esteban Chaves
Duo Normand, Luke Durbridge & Svein Tuft
Il Lombardia, Esteban Chaves

== 2017 – Orica–Scott ==
Australia National Criterium Championships, Caleb Ewan
People's Choice Classic, Caleb Ewan
Stages 1, 3, 4 & 6 Tour Down Under, Caleb Ewan
Overall Herald Sun Tour, Damien Howson

Stage 1, Damien Howson

Stage 3 Volta a la Comunitat Valenciana, Magnus Cort Nielsen
South Africa National Time Trial Championships, Daryl Impey
Clásica de Almería, Magnus Cort Nielsen
Stage 4 Abu Dhabi Tour, Caleb Ewan
GP Industria & Artigianato, Adam Yates
Stage 6 Paris–Nice, Simon Yates
Stage 6 Volta a Catalunya, Daryl Impey
Stage 3b Three Days of De Panne, Luke Durbridge
GP Miguel Induráin, Simon Yates
Stage 2 Tour of the Basque Country, Michael Albasini
Stage 1 Tour de Romandie, Michael Albasini
Stage 4 Tour de Romandie, Simon Yates
Stage 7 Giro d'Italia, Caleb Ewan
Stage 2 Tour of Slovenia, Luka Mezgec
China Time Trial Championships, Cheung King Lok
Slovenia National Road Race Championships, Luka Mezgec
Canada Time Trial Championships, Svein Tuft
Young rider classification Tour de France, Simon Yates
Slovenia Slovenian MTB XC Championships, Luka Mezgec
Stage 4 Tour de Pologne, Caleb Ewan
Stage 6 Tour de Pologne, Jack Haig
Arnhem–Veenendaal Classic, Luka Mezgec
Pro Ötztaler 5500, Roman Kreuziger
Slovenia Slovenian Cyclo-cross Championship, Luka Mezgec

== 2018 – Mitchelton–Scott ==
Australia National Criterium Championships, Caleb Ewan
Australia National Road Race Championships, Alexander Edmondson
Overall Tour Down Under, Daryl Impey

Stage 2, Caleb Ewan

Overall Herald Sun Tour, Esteban Chaves

1st Stage 3, Esteban Chaves

South Africa National Time Trial Championships, Daryl Impey
South Africa National Road Race Championships, Daryl Impey
Clásica de Almería, Caleb Ewan
Stage 7 Paris–Nice, Simon Yates
Stage 5 Tirreno–Adriatico Adam Yates
Stage 7 Volta a Catalunya, Simon Yates
Stage 6 Giro d'Italia, Esteban Chaves
Stages 9, 11 & 15 Giro d'Italia, Simon Yates
Overall Tour des Fjords, Michael Albasini

Stage 2, Michael Albasini

Stage 20 Giro d'Italia, Mikel Nieve
Overall Hammer Stavanger

Stages 1, 2 & 3

Stages 2 & 3 Hammer Sportzone Limburg
Stage 1 Critérium du Dauphiné, Daryl Impey
Stage 8 Critérium du Dauphiné, Adam Yates
Stage 4 Tour de Suisse, Christopher Juul-Jensen
Canada National Time Trial Championships, Svein Tuft
Prueba Villafranca-Ordiziako Klasika, Robert Power
Stage 2 Tour of Britain, Cameron Meyer
Stage 7 Tour de Pologne, Simon Yates
Overall Vuelta a España, Simon Yates

Stage 14, Simon Yates

Stage 8 Tour of Britain, Caleb Ewan

== 2019 – Mitchelton–Scott ==
Australia National Time Trial Championships, Luke Durbridge
Overall Tour Down Under, Daryl Impey

Stage 4, Daryl Impey

Stage 4 Herald Sun Tour, Nick Schultz
Stage 2 Volta a la Comunitat Valenciana, Matteo Trentin
South Africa National Time Trial Championships, Daryl Impey
South Africa National Road Race Championships, Daryl Impey
Stage 2 Vuelta a Andalucía, Matteo Trentin
Stage 4 Vuelta a Andalucía, Simon Yates
Stage 1 (TTT) Tirreno–Adriatico
Stage 5 (ITT) Paris–Nice, Simon Yates
Stage 3 Volta a Catalunya, Adam Yates
Stage 1b (TTT) Settimana Internazionale di Coppi e Bartali
Stage 6 Tour of the Basque Country, Adam Yates
Stage 19, Giro d'Italia, Esteban Chaves
Stage 4 Tour of Norway, Edoardo Affini
Stage 3 Hammer Limburg
Stage 2 Tour of Slovenia, Luka Mezgec
Ethiopia National Time Trial Championships, Tsgabu Grmay
Stage 9 Tour de France, Daryl Impey
Stage 12 & 15 Tour de France, Simon Yates
Stage 17 Tour de France, Matteo Trentin
Stage 2 & 5 Tour de Pologne, Luka Mezgec
Overall Czech Cycling Tour, Daryl Impey

Stage 1, TTT
Stage 4, Lucas Hamilton

Stage 2 Tour of Britain, Matteo Trentin
Stage 6 (ITT) Tour of Britain, Edoardo Affini
Overall CRO Race, Adam Yates

Stage 5, Adam Yates

== 2020 – Mitchelton–Scott ==
Australia National Time Trial Championships, Luke Durbridge
Australia National Road Race Championships, Cameron Meyer
Stages 3 & 5 Herald Sun Tour, Kaden Groves
South Africa National Time Trial Championships, Daryl Impey
Stage 4 Vuelta a Andalucía, Jack Haig
Overall UAE Tour, Adam Yates

Stage 3, Adam Yates

Overall Czech Cycling Tour, Damien Howson

Stage 1, TTT
Stage 4, Damien Howson

Hungary Time Trial Championships, Barnabás Peák
Overall Tirreno–Adriatico, Simon Yates

Stage 4, Lucas Hamilton
Stage 5, Simon Yates

Coppa Sabatini, Dion Smith

== 2021 – Team BikeExchange ==
Australia National Criterium Championships, Kaden Groves
Australia National Road Race Championships, Cameron Meyer
Stage 4 Volta a Catalunya, Esteban Chaves
Overall Tour of the Alps, Simon Yates

Stage 2, Simon Yates

Overall Tour de Hongrie, Damien Howson

Stage 4, Damien Howson

Stage 19 Giro d'Italia, Simon Yates
Stage 2 Czech Cycling Tour, Nick Schultz
Prologue Okolo Slovenska, Kaden Groves

== 2022 – Team BikeExchange–Jayco ==
Stages 3 & 5 Saudi Tour, Dylan Groenewegen
Stage 8 Paris–Nice, Simon Yates
Stage 1 Volta a Catalunya, Michael Matthews
Stage 2 Volta a Catalunya, Kaden Groves
Stage 2 Tour of Turkey, Kaden Groves
Stages 1 & 3 Vuelta Asturias, Simon Yates
Stage 2 (ITT) & 14 Giro d'Italia, Simon Yates
Stage 4 Tour de Hongrie, Dylan Groenewegen
Veenendaal–Veenendaal Classic, Dylan Groenewegen
Stage 21 Giro d'Italia, Matteo Sobrero
Stage 2 Tour of Slovenia, Dylan Groenewegen
United States National Time Trial Championships, Lawson Craddock
Stage 3 Tour de France, Dylan Groenewegen
Stage 14 Tour de France, Michael Matthews
Prueba Villafranca de Ordizia, Simon Yates
Overall Vuelta a Castilla y León, Simon Yates

Stage 2, Simon Yates

Stage 2 Arctic Race of Norway, Dylan Groenewegen
Stage 11 Vuelta a España, Kaden Groves

== 2023 – Team Jayco–AlUla ==
Stage 5 Tour Down Under, Simon Yates
Stage 1 Saudi Tour, Dylan Groenewegen
Stage 5 UAE Tour, Dylan Groenewegen
Per sempre Alfredo, Felix Engelhardt
Stage 5 Giro d'Italia, Michael Matthews
Stage 18 Giro d'Italia, Filippo Zana
Stage 1 Tour de Hongrie, Dylan Groenewegen
Veenendaal–Veenendaal Classic, Dylan Groenewegen
Overall Tour of Slovenia, Filippo Zana

Stages 1 & 2, Dylan Groenewegen
Stage 4, Jesús David Peña

Ethiopia National Time Trial Championships, Tsgabu Grmay
Stage 4 Tour of Austria, Matteo Sobrero
Stage 1 Vuelta a Castilla y León, Felix Engelhardt
Stage 6 CRO Race, Campbell Stewart
Hong Kong Challenge, Lukas Pöstlberger

== 2024 – Team Jayco–AlUla ==
Australia National Time Trial Championships, Luke Plapp
Australia National Road Race Championships, Luke Plapp
Clàssica Comunitat Valenciana 1969, Dylan Groenewegen
Gran Premio Castellón, Michael Matthews
Overall AlUla Tour, Simon Yates

Stage 5, Simon Yates

Stage 1 Tour of Oman, Caleb Ewan
Stage 2 Tour of the Alps, Alessandro De Marchi
Ronde van Limburg, Dylan Groenewegen
Stage 1 Tour of Slovenia, Dylan Groenewegen
Ireland National Time Trial Championships, Eddie Dunbar
Switzerland National Road Race Championships, Mauro Schmid
Netherlands National Road Race Championships, Dylan Groenewegen
Overall Okolo Slovenska, Mauro Schmid

Stage 1 (TTT)
Stage 2, Anders Foldager
Stage 5, Felix Engelhardt

Stage 1 Tour of Austria, Davide De Pretto
Stage 6 Tour de France, Dylan Groenewegen
Vuelta a Castilla y León, Caleb Ewan
Stage 2 Vuelta a Burgos, Caleb Ewan
Stages 11 & 20 Vuelta a España, Eddie Dunbar
Grand Prix Cycliste de Québec, Michael Matthews
Omloop van het Houtland, Max Walscheid

== 2025 – Team Jayco–AlUla ==
Australia National Time Trial Championships, Luke Plapp
Australia National Road Race Championships, Luke Durbridge
Cadel Evans Great Ocean Road Race, Mauro Schmid
South Africa National Time Trial Championships, Alan Hatherly
Stage 8 Giro d'Italia, Luke Plapp
Stage 18 Tour de France, Ben O'Connor

== 2026 – Team Jayco–AlUla ==
1st Overall Settimana Internazionale di Coppi e Bartali, Mauro Schmid

== Supplementary statistics ==
World Team Time Trial performance
World TTT Championships	2012	2013	2014	2015	2016	2017	2018	2019	2020	2021	2022	2023	2024	2025
Position	3	2	2	4	3	5	5	Does not Exist						
Margin	+ 47"	+ 1"	+ 32"	+ 54"	+ 37"	+ 43"	+ 57"	Does not Exist						
'Grand Tours by highest finishing position
Race	2012	2013	2014	2015	2016	2017	2018	2019	2020	2021	2022	2023	2024	2025
Giro d'Italia	121	37	154	55	2	9	17	8	DNF (Note: The team pulled out on the second rest day after two positive coronavirus tests.)	3	13	7	11	23
Tour de France	72	68	67	50	4	7	23	29	9	13	23	4	12	11
Vuelta a España	77	69	41	5	3	11	1	10	13	31	55	70	11	
Major week-long stage races by highest finishing position
Race	2012	2013	2014	2015	2016	2017	2018	2019	2020	2021	2022	2023	2024	2025
Tour Down Under	1	24	1	7	1	2	1	1	6	NH		2	7	6
Paris–Nice	37	52	44	29	7	9	2	4	–	4	2	4	6	14
Tirreno–Adriatico	10	66	20	9	19	53	5	2	1	10	44	93	19	25
Volta a Catalunya	1	56	23	13	48	4	4	2	NH	6	33	47	6	12
Tour of the Basque Country	63	6	12	5	32	22	16	5	NH	9	OTL	9	33	72
Tour de Romandie	19	26	40	6	16	2	16	19	NH	8	53	9	11	20
Critérium du Dauphiné	11	26	6	5	7	13	2	27	17	16	26	16	13	19
Tour de Suisse	58	10	16	14	44	16	13	49	NH	10	21	13	57	7
Tour de Pologne	102	1	37	41	20	5	2	16	3	13	4	7	24	
Benelux Tour	5	5	8	39	23	13	23	14	57	6	NH (Note: The Organisers cancelled the 2022 edition due to an "overcrowded" calendar.)	42	36	
'Monument races by highest finishing position
Race	2012	2013	2014	2015	2016	2017	2018	2019	2020	2021	2022	2023	2024	2025
Milan–San Remo	1	23	49	3	59	10	2	10	6	6	4	23	2	4
Tour of Flanders	31	10	37	19	21	12	45	21	23	21	11	46	11	13
Paris–Roubaix	53	7	25	6	1	11	22	43	NH	54	47	75	49	59
Liège–Bastogne–Liège	19	10	1	14	2	7	8	4	22	14	45	21	32	11
Giro di Lombardia	15	DNF	6	8	1	24	15	6	54	18	42	5	20	
Classics by highest finishing position
Classic	2012	2013	2014	2015	2016	2017	2018	2019	2020	2021	2022	2023	2024	2025
Omloop Het Nieuwsblad	56	33	–	–	69	16	45	9	52	36	109	108	53	27
Kuurne–Brussels–Kuurne	12	–	–	–	15	12	16	50	14	15	17	66	38	26
Strade Bianche	–	–	–	17	31	6	6	18	7	30	74	21	9	31
E3 Harelbeke	12	5	38	9	28	4	11	7	NH	56	26	27	54	27
Gent–Wevelgem	12	25	37	18	12	2	7	7	65	5	13	44	9	39
Amstel Gold Race	20	3	3	3	5	3	2	10	NH	4	7	38	10	5
La Flèche Wallonne	2	21	16	3	7	5	4	28	18	8	14	21	DNF	10
Clásica de San Sebastián	2	34	24	1	7	18	15	23	NH	22	6	18	31	

Legend
—	Did not compete
DNF	Did not finish
DNS	Did not start
NH	Not held
OTL	Over time limit
