= 2023 UCI Europe Tour =

Nineteenth season of the UCI Europe Tour

- Nineteenth edition of the UCI Europe Tour

Details
- Dates: 22 January – 15 October
- Location: Europe
- Races: 187

The 2023 UCI Europe Tour was the nineteenth season of the UCI Europe Tour.

Throughout the season, points were awarded to the top finishers of stages within stage races and the final general classification standings of each of the stages races and one-day events. The quality and complexity of a race also determined how many points were awarded to the top finishers, the higher the UCI rating of a race, the more points were awarded.

The UCI ratings from highest to lowest were as follows:

- Multi-day events: 2.Pro, 2.1 and 2.2
- One-day events: 1.Pro, 1.1 and 1.2

== Events ==
=== January ===
Races in the 2023 UCI Europe Tour
| Race | Rating | Date | Winner | Team | Ref |
|---|---|---|---|---|---|
| (Spain) Clàssica Comunitat Valenciana | 1.1 | 22 January 2023 | Arnaud De Lie (BEL) | Lotto–Dstny | |
| (Spain) Trofeo Calvià | 1.1 | 25 January 2023 | Rui Costa (POR) | Intermarché–Circus–Wanty | |
| (Spain) Trofeo Alcúdia – Port d'Alcúdia | 1.1 | 26 January 2023 | Marijn van den Berg (NED) | EF Education–EasyPost | |
| (Spain) Trofeo Port d'Andratx – Port d'Pollença | 1.1 | 27 January 2023 | Kobe Goossens (BEL) | Intermarché–Circus–Wanty | |
| (Spain) Trofeo Serra Tramuntana | 1.1 | 28 January 2023 | Kobe Goossens (BEL) | Intermarché–Circus–Wanty | |
| (Turkey) Grand Prix Aspendos | 1.2 | 28 January 2023 | Yegor Strelnikov (KAZ) | Vino SKO Team | |
| (France) Grand Prix La Marseillaise | 1.1 | 29 January 2023 | Neilson Powless (USA) | EF Education–EasyPost | |
| (Spain) Trofeo Palma | 1.1 | 29 January 2023 | Ethan Vernon (GBR) | Soudal–Quick-Step | |

=== February ===
Races in the 2023 UCI Europe Tour
| Race | Rating | Date | Winner | Team |
|---|---|---|---|---|
| (France) Étoile de Bessèges | 2.1 | 1–5 February 2023 | Neilson Powless (USA) | EF Education–EasyPost |
| (Turkey) Grand Prix Apollon Temple | 1.2 | 4 February 2023 | Sergey Rostovtsev | Beykoz Belediyesi Spor Kulübü |
| (Turkey) Tour of Antalya | 2.1 | 9–11 February 2023 | Cancelled due to the 2023 Turkey–Syria earthquake | |
| (Spain) Vuelta a Murcia | 1.1 | 11 February 2023 | Ben Turner (GBR) | Ineos Grenadiers |
| (Portugal) Figueira Champions Classic | 1.1 | 12 February 2023 | Casper Pedersen (DEN) | Soudal–Quick-Step |
| (Spain) Clásica Jaén Paraíso Interior | 1.1 | 13 February 2023 | Tadej Pogačar (SLO) | UAE Team Emirates |
| (France) Tour des Alpes-Maritimes et du Var | 2.1 | 17–19 February 2023 | Kévin Vauquelin (FRA) | Arkéa–Samsic |
| (Spain) O Gran Camiño | 2.1 | 23–26 February 2023 | Jonas Vingegaard (DEN) | Team Jumbo–Visma |
| (Belgium) Le Samyn | 1.1 | 28 February 2023 | Milan Menten (BEL) | Lotto–Dstny |

=== March ===
Races in the 2023 UCI Europe Tour
| Race | Rating | Date | Winner | Team |
|---|---|---|---|---|
| (Croatia) Trofej Umag | 1.2 | 1 March 2023 | Adam Ťoupalík (CZE) | Kasper Crypto4me |
| (Netherlands) Ster van Zwolle | 1.2 | 4 March 2023 | Coen Vermeltfoort (NED) | VolkerWessels Cycling Team |
| (Belgium) Grand Prix Criquielion | 1.1 | 4 March 2023 | Sam Welsford (AUS) | Team DSM |
| (France) Le Tour des 100 Communes | 1.2 | 4 March 2023 | Jonathan Vervenne (BEL) | Soudal–Quick-Step Devo Team |
| (Turkey) Alanya Cup | 1.2 | 4 March 2023 | Willie Smit (RSA) | China Anta–Mentech Cycling Team |
| (Greece) Visit South Aegean Islands | 2.2 | 4–5 March 2023 | Jakub Otruba (CZE) | ATT Investments |
| (Croatia) Poreč Trophy | 1.2 | 5 March 2023 | Patryk Stosz (POL) | Voster ATS Team |
| (France) Grand Prix de la Ville de Lillers | 1.2 | 5 March 2023 | Andreas Stokbro (DEN) | Leopard TOGT Pro Cycling |
| (Belgium) Grote Prijs Jean-Pierre Monseré | 1.1 | 5 March 2023 | Gerben Thijssen (BEL) | Intermarché–Circus–Wanty |
| (Croatia) Istrian Spring Trophy | 2.2 | 9–12 March 2023 | Tijmen Graat (NED) | Visma–Lease a Bike Development |
| (Greece) Rhodes GP | 1.2 | 11 March 2023 | Eirik Lunder (NOR) | Team Drali–Repsol |
| (Netherlands) Albert Achterhes Profronde van Drenthe | 1.1 | 12 March 2023 | Per Strand Hagenes (NOR) | Team Jumbo–Visma |
| (Netherlands) Dorpenomloop Rucphen | 1.2 | 12 March 2023 | Laurenz Rex (BEL) | Circus–ReUz–Technord |
| (Greece) International Tour of Rhodes | 2.2 | 16–19 March 2023 | António Morgado (POR) | Hagens Berman Jayco |
| (Belgium) Youngster Coast Challenge | 1.2U | 17 March 2023 | Warre Vangheluwe (BEL) | Soudal–Quick-Step Devo Team |
| (France) Classic Loire Atlantique | 1.1 | 18 March 2023 | Axel Zingle (FRA) | Cofidis |
| (France) Cholet-Pays de la Loire | 1.1 | 19 March 2023 | Laurence Pithie (NZL) | Groupama–FDJ |
| (Italy) Per sempre Alfredo | 1.1 | 19 March 2023 | Felix Engelhardt (GER) | Team Jayco–AlUla |
| (Slovenia) GP Slovenian Istria | 1.2 | 19 March 2023 | Bartłomiej Proć (POL) | Santic–Wibatech |
| (Italy) La Popolarissima | 1.2 | 19 March 2023 | Davide Persico (ITA) | MBH Bank CSB Telecom Fort |
| (Portugal) Clássica da Arrábida | 1.2 | 19 March 2023 | Orluis Aular (VEN) | Caja Rural–Seguros RGA |
| (Italy) Settimana Internazionale di Coppi e Bartali | 2.1 | 21–25 March 2023 | Mauro Schmid (SUI) | Soudal–Quick-Step |
| (Portugal) Volta ao Alentejo | 2.2 | 22–26 March 2023 | Orluis Aular (VEN) | Caja Rural–Seguros RGA |
| (Netherlands) Olympia's Tour | 2.2 | 22–26 March 2023 | Mathias Bregnhøj (DEN) | Leopard TOGT Pro Cycling |
| (Slovenia) GP Goriska & Vipava Valley | 1.2 | 23 March 2023 | Adam Ťoupalík (CZE) | Kasper Crypto4me |
| (Slovenia) GP Adria Mobil | 1.2 | 26 March 2023 | Tilen Finkšt (SLO) | Kolesarski Klub Novo Mesto |
| (France) La Roue Tourangelle | 1.1 | 26 March 2023 | Rory Townsend (IRL) | Bolton Equities Black Spoke |
| (Turkey) Syedra Ancient City | 1.2 | 26 March 2023 | Polychronis Tzortzakis (GRE) | Škoda Cycling Team |
| (Belgium) Gent–Wevelgem/Grote Prijs A. Noyelle – Ieper | 1.2U | 26 March 2023 | Gil Gelders (BEL) | Soudal–Quick-Step Devo Team |
| (France) Route Adélie de Vitré | 1.1 | 31 March 2023 | Fredrik Dversnes (NOR) | Uno-X Pro Cycling Team |

=== April ===
Races in the 2023 UCI Europe Tour
| Race | Rating | Date | Winner | Team |
|---|---|---|---|---|
| (Netherlands) Volta Limburg Classic | 1.1 | 1 April 2023 | Kaden Groves (AUS) | Alpecin–Deceuninck |
| (Italy) Trofeo Banca Popolare di Vicenza | 1.2U | 2 April 2023 | Giacomo Villa (ITA) | Biesse–Carrera |
| (France) Région Pays de la Loire Tour | 2.1 | 4–7 April 2023 | Alexander Kamp (DEN) | Tudor Pro Cycling Team |
| (France) Circuit des Ardennes | 2.2 | 6–9 April 2023 | Mathias Bregnhøj (DEN) | Leopard TOGT Pro Cycling |
| (Italy) Giro del Belvedere | 1.2U | 10 April 2023 | Johannes Staune-Mittet (NOR) | Jumbo–Visma Development Team |
| (France) Paris–Camembert | 1.1 | 11 April 2023 | Valentin Ferron (FRA) | Team TotalEnergies |
| (Italy) Gran Premio Palio del Recioto | 1.2U | 11 April 2023 | Tijmen Graat (NED) | Jumbo–Visma Development Team |
| (Italy) Giro di Sicilia | 2.1 | 11–14 April 2023 | Alexey Lutsenko (KAZ) | Astana Qazaqstan Team |
| (France) Tour du Loir et Cher | 2.2 | 12–16 April 2023 | Tim Marsman (NED) | Metec–Solarwatt p/b Mantel |
| (France) Classic Grand Besançon Doubs | 1.1 | 14 April 2023 | Victor Lafay (FRA) | Cofidis |
| (France) Tour du Jura Cycliste | 1.1 | 15 April 2023 | Kévin Vauquelin (FRA) | Arkéa–Samsic |
| (Belgium) Liège–Bastogne–Liège U23 | 1.2U | 15 April 2023 | Francesco Busatto (ITA) | Circus–ReUz–Technord |
| (Netherlands) Arno Wallaard Memorial | 1.2 | 15 April 2023 | Rasmus Bøgh Wallin (DEN) | Restaurant Suri–Carl Ras |
| (Italy) Giro della Città Metropolitana di Reggio Calabria | 1.1 | 16 April 2023 | Jhonatan Restrepo (COL) | GW Shimano–Sidermec |
| (France) Tour du Doubs | 1.1 | 16 April 2023 | Jesús Herrada (ESP) | Cofidis |
| (Italy) Trofeo Città di San Vendemiano | 1.2U | 16 April 2023 | Anders Foldager (DEN) | Biesse–Carrera |
| (Bosnia and Herzegovina) Belgrade–Banja Luka | 2.2 | 19–22 April 2023 | Gregor Matija Černe (SLO) | mebloJOGI Pro-concrete |
| (United Kingdom) Rutland–Melton CiCLE Classic | 1.2 | 23 April 2023 | Luke Lamperti (USA) | Trinity Racing |
| (Italy) Gran Premio della Liberazione | 1.2U | 25 April 2023 | Alessandro Romele (ITA) | Team Colpack–Ballan–CSB |
| (France) Le Tour de Bretagne Cycliste | 2.2 | 25 April – 1 May 2023 | Simon Pellaud (SUI) | Tudor Pro Cycling Team |
| (Spain) Vuelta Asturias Julio Alvarez Mendo | 2.1 | 28–30 April 2023 | Lorenzo Fortunato (ITA) | Eolo–Kometa |
| (Poland) Carpathian Couriers Race | 2.2U | 29 April–3 May 2023 | Gal Glivar (SLO) | Adria Mobil |
| GP Vorarlberg p/by GLS Austria | 1.2 | 30 April 2023 | Michael Boroš (CZE) | Elkov–Kasper |

=== May ===
Races in the 2023 UCI Europe Tour
| Race | Rating | Date | Winner | Team |
|---|---|---|---|---|
| (Italy) Circuito del Porto | 1.2 | 1 May 2023 | Mattia Pinazzi (ITA) | Biesse–Carrera |
| (Germany) Eschborn–Frankfurt Under-23 | 1.2U | 1 May 2023 | Joshua Gudnitz (DEN) | Team ColoQuick |
| (Greece) International Tour of Hellas | 2.1 | 2–6 May 2023 | Iúri Leitão (POR) | Caja Rural–Seguros RGA |
| (Netherlands) Ronde van Overijssel | 2.2 | 6 May 2023 | Coen Vermeltfoort (NED) | VolkerWessels Cycling Team |
| (Norway) Sundvolden GP | 1.2 | 6 May 2023 | Ådne Holter (NOR) | Uno-X Dare Development Team |
| (Norway) Ringerike GP | 1.2 | 7 May 2023 | Jack Rootkin-Gray (GBR) | Saint Piran |
| (Belgium) Flèche Ardennaise | 1.2 | 7 May 2023 | Menno Huising (NED) | Jumbo–Visma Development Team |
| (France) Paris–Roubaix Espoirs | 1.2U | 7 May 2023 | Tijl De Decker (BEL) | Lotto–Dstny Development Team |
| (Denmark) Grand Prix Herning | 1.2 | 13 May 2023 | Mathias Norsgaard (DEN) | Denmark (national team) |
| (France) Tour du Finistère | 1.1 | 13 May 2023 | Paul Penhoët (FRA) | Groupama–FDJ |
| (France) Boucles de l'Aulne – Châteaulin | 1.1 | 14 May 2023 | Greg Van Avermaet (BEL) | AG2R Citroën Team |
| (Denmark) Fyen Rundt – Tour of Funen | 1.2 | 14 May 2023 | Carl-Frederik Bévort (DEN) | Uno-X Dare Development Team |
| (Italy) Gran Premio Industrie del Marmo | 1.2U | 14 May 2023 | Christian Bagatin (ITA) | Sias–Rime |
| (Turkey) Tour of Sakarya | 2.2 | 17–20 May 2023 | Martin Laas (EST) | Astana Qazaqstan Development Team |
| (Luxembourg) Flèche du Sud | 2.2 | 17–21 May 2023 | Pim Ronhaar (NED) | Baloise–Trek Lions |
| (Belgium) Circuit de Wallonie | 1.1 | 18 May 2023 | Jordi Meeus (BEL) | Bora–Hansgrohe |
| (Netherlands) Veenendaal–Veenendaal Classic | 1.1 | 20 May 2023 | Dylan Groenewegen (NED) | Team Jayco–AlUla |
| (Slovenia) GP Gorenjska | 1.2 | 21 May 2023 | Davide De Cassan (ITA) | Cycling Team Friuli ASD |
| (Germany) Rund um Köln | 1.1 | 21 May 2023 | Danny van Poppel (NED) | Bora–Hansgrohe |
| (Belgium) Antwerp Port Epic / Sels Trophy | 1.1 | 21 May 2023 | Dries De Bondt (BEL) | Alpecin–Deceuninck |
| Tour of Albania | 2.2 | 22–26 May 2023 | Max Stedman (GBR) | AT85 Pro Cycling |
| (France) Alpes Isère Tour | 2.2 | 24–28 May 2023 | Lennert Van Eetvelt (BEL) | Lotto–Dstny Development Team |
| (Poland) Orlen Nations Grand Prix | 2.NCup | 24–28 May 2023 | Gal Glivar (SLO) | Adria Mobil |
| Tour of Estonia | 2.1 | 25–27 May 2023 | Rasmus Bøgh Wallin (DEN) | Restaurant Suri–Carl Ras |
| (France) Tour de la Mirabelle | 2.2 | 25–28 May 2023 | Jonas Geens (BEL) | Tarteletto–Isorex |
| (Portugal) Grande Prémio Beiras e Serra da Estrela | 2.2 | 26–28 May 2023 | Artem Nych | Glassdrive–Q8–Anicolor |
| (Belgium) Van Merksteijn Fences Classic | 1.1 | 27 May 2023 | Caleb Ewan (AUS) | Lotto–Dstny |
| (Italy) Due Giorni Marchigiana – G.P. Santa Rita | 1.2 | 27 May 2023 | Giosuè Epis (ITA) | Zalf Euromobil Fior |
| (Italy) Due Giorni Marchigiana – Trofeo Città di Castelfidardo | 1.2 | 28 May 2023 | Matteo Pongiluppi (ITA) | Sias–Rime |
| (Belgium) Ronde van Limburg | 1.1 | 29 May 2023 | Gerben Thijssen (BEL) | Intermarché–Circus–Wanty |
| (France) Paris–Troyes | 1.2 | 29 May 2023 | Gwen Leclainche (FRA) | Philippe Wagner Cycling |
| (France) Mercan'Tour Classic Alpes-Maritimes | 1.1 | 30 May 2023 | Richard Carapaz (ECU) | EF Education–EasyPost |

=== June ===
Races in the 2023 UCI Europe Tour
| Race | Rating | Date | Winner | Team |
|---|---|---|---|---|
| (Poland) Tour of Małopolska | 2.2 | 1–4 June 2023 | Márton Dina (HUN) | ATT Investments |
| (Austria) Oberösterreich Rundfahrt | 2.2 | 1–4 June 2023 | Luca Vergallito (ITA) | Alpecin–Deceuninck Development Team |
| (France) Ronde de l'Oise | 2.2 | 1–4 June 2023 | Frank van den Broek (NED) | ABLOC CT |
| (Italy) Trofeo Alcide Degasperi | 1.2 | 2 June 2023 | Davide De Pretto (ITA) | Zalf Euromobil Fior |
| (Italy) Giro dell'Appennino | 1.1 | 2 June 2023 | Marc Hirschi (SUI) | UAE Team Emirates |
| (Belgium) Heylen Vastgoed Heistse Pijl | 1.1 | 3 June 2023 | Olav Kooij (NED) | Team Jumbo–Visma |
| (Belgium) Memorial Philippe Van Coningsloo | 1.2 | 4 June 2023 | Gianluca Pollefliet (BEL) | Lotto–Dstny Development Team |
| (Italy) Coppa della Pace | 1.2U | 4 June 2023 | Matteo Scalco (ITA) | Green Project–Bardiani–CSF–Faizanè |
| (Switzerland) Grosser Preis des Kantons Aargau | 1.1 | 9 June 2023 | Thibau Nys (BEL) | Trek–Segafredo |
| (France) Tour d'Eure-et-Loir | 2.2 | 9–11 June 2023 | Noa Isidore (FRA) | CIC U Nantes Atlantique |
| (Turkey) Kırıkkale Road Race | 2.2 | 10–11 June 2023 | Nikiforos Arvanitou (GRE) | Sofer–Savini Due–OMZ |
| (Belgium) Elfstedenronde Brugge | 1.1 | 11 June 2023 | Jasper Philipsen (BEL) | Alpecin–Deceuninck |
| (Czech Republic) Course de la Paix U23 – Grand Prix Jeseníky | 2.Ncup | 8–11 June 2023 | Antoine Huby (FRA) | France (national team) |
| (Italy) Giro Next Gen | 2.2U | 11–18 June 2023 | Johannes Staune-Mittet (NOR) | Jumbo–Visma Development Team |
| (France) La Route d'Occitanie – La Dépêche du Midi | 2.1 | 15–18 June 2023 | Michael Woods (CAN) | Israel–Premier Tech |
| (France) Tour du Pays de Montbéliard | 2.2 | 16–18 June 2023 | Sten Van Gucht (BEL) | Bourg-en-Bresse Ain Cyclisme |
| (Poland) Course Cycliste de Solidarnosc et des Champions Olympiques | 2.2 | 28 June – 1 July 2023 | Siim Kiskonen (EST) | Tartu2024 Cycling Team |

=== July ===
Races in the 2023 UCI Europe Tour
| Race | Rating | Date | Winner | Team |
|---|---|---|---|---|
| (Netherlands) Midden–Brabant Poort Omloop | 1.2 | 2 July 2023 | Thimo Willems (BEL) | VolkerWessels Cycling Team |
| (Italy) Giro del Medio Brenta | 1.2 | 2 July 2023 | Giulio Pellizzari (ITA) | Green Project–Bardiani–CSF–Faizanè |
| Int. Österreich-Rundfaht – Tour of Austria | 2.1 | 2–6 July 2023 | Jhonatan Narváez (ECU) | Ineos Grenadiers |
| (Italy) Trofeo Città di Brescia – Mem. Rino Fiori | 1.2 | 4 July 2023 | Federico Guzzo (ITA) | Zalf Euromobil Fior |
| (Romania) Sibiu Cycling Tour | 2.1 | 6–9 July 2023 | Mark Donovan (GBR) | Pinarello–Q36.5 Pro Cycling Team |
| (Turkey) Grand Prix Erciyes | 1.2 | 8 July 2023 | Max Stedman (GBR) | Istanbul Büyükșehir Belediye Spor Türkiye |
| (Hungary) Visegrad 4 Kerekparverseny | 1.2 | 8 July 2023 | Adam Ťoupalík (CZE) | Kasper Crypto4me |
| Visegrad 4 Bicycle Race – GP Slovakia | 1.2 | 9 July 2023 | Maciej Paterski (POL) | Voster Team |
| (Italy) Giro della Valle d'Aosta | 2.2U | 12–16 July 2023 | Darren Rafferty (IRL) | Hagens Berman Jayco |
| (Portugal) GP Internacional Torres Vedras – Troféu Joaquim Agostinho | 2.2 | 13–16 July 2023 | Mauricio Moreira (URU) | Anicolor / Campicarn |
| (Hungary) Gemenc GP | 2.2 | 14–16 July 2023 | Filip Řeha (CZE) | Kasper Crypto4me |
| (Belgium) SD WORX BW Classic | 1.2 | 19 July 2023 | Milan Fretin (BEL) | Team Flanders–Baloise |
| Visegrad 4 Bicycle Race Grand Prix Poland | 1.2 | 22 July 2023 | Itamar Einhorn (ISR) | Israel–Premier Tech |
| Visegrad 4 Bicycle Race – GP Czech Republic | 1.2 | 23 July 2023 | Adam Ťoupalík (CZE) | Kasper Crypto4me |
| (Romania) Cupa Max Ausnit | 1.2 | 23 July 2023 | Nicolás Tivani (ARG) | Team Corratec |
| (France) Grand Prix de la ville de Pérenchies | 1.2 | 23 July 2023 | Rait Ärm (EST) | Van Rysel–Roubaix |
| (Slovenia) GP Kranj | 1.2 | 23 July 2023 | Edoardo Zamperini (ITA) | Zalf Euromobil Fior |
| (Spain) Prueba Villafranca de Ordizia – Ordiziako Klasika | 1.1 | 25 July 2023 | Marc Hirschi (SUI) | UAE Team Emirates |
| (Poland) Memoriał Andrzeja Trochanowskiego | 1.2 | 25 July 2023 | Itamar Einhorn (ISR) | Israel (National team) |
| (Spain) Vuelta a Castilla y León | 2.1 | 26–27 July 2023 | Eduardo Sepúlveda (ARG) | Lotto–Dstny |
| (Poland) Dookoła Mazowsza | 2.2 | 26–29 July 2023 | Oded Kogut (ISR) | Israel (National team) |
| (France) Tour Alsace | 2.2 | 26–30 July 2023 | Sebastian Berwick (AUS) | NSN Cycling Team |
| (Czech Republic) Czech Tour | 2.1 | 27–30 July 2023 | Florian Lipowitz (GER) | Bora–Hansgrohe |
| (France) Kreiz Breizh Elites | 2.2 | 28–31 July 2023 | Hartthijs de Vries (NED) | Unibet Rose Rockets |
| (Turkey) Grand Prix Kültepe | 1.2 | 30 July 2023 | Daniil Marukhin (KAZ) | Team Vino–North Qazaqstan Region |
| (Spain) Circuito de Getxo – Memorial Hermanos Otxoa | 1.1 | 30 July 2023 | Alexey Lutsenko (KAZ) | Astana Qazaqstan Team |
| (Poland) Puchar MON | 1.2 | 30 July 2023 | Bartosz Rudyk (POL) | Voster Team |
| (France) Tour de l'Ain | 2.1 | 31 July – 2 August 2023 | Michael Storer (AUS) | Groupama–FDJ |

=== August ===
Races in the 2023 UCI Europe Tour
| Race | Rating | Date | Winner | Team |
|---|---|---|---|---|
| (Turkey) 100th Anniversary Tour of The Republic | 2.2 | 1–5 August 2023 | Mengis Petros (ERI) | Istanbul Büyükșehir Belediye Spor Türkiye |
| (France) Tour de Guadeloupe | 2.2 | 4–13 August 2023 | Benjamin Le Ny (FRA) | Uni Sport Lamentinois |
| (Romania) Tour of Szeklerland | 2.2 | 8–12 August 2023 | Martin Messner (AUT) | WSA KTM Graz |
| Volta a Portugal | 2.1 | 9–20 August 2023 | Colin Stüssi (SUI) | Team Vorarlberg |
| (Poland) Memoriał Henryka Łasaka | 1.2 | 12 August 2023 | Michael Kukrle (CZE) | Team Felt–Felbermayr |
| (Poland) Coupe des Carpathes | 1.2 | 13 August 2023 | Michael Kukrle (CZE) | Team Felt–Felbermayr |
| (France) La Polynormande | 1.1 | 13 August 2023 | Arnaud De Lie (BEL) | Lotto–Dstny |
| (Italy) Gran Premio di Poggiana | 1.2U | 13 August 2023 | Nicolò Pettiti (ITA) | Sias–Rime |
| (Belgium) Tour of Leuven | 1.1 | 15 August 2023 | Arnaud De Lie (BEL) | Lotto–Dstny |
| (France) Tour du Limousin | 2.1 | 15–18 August 2023 | Romain Grégoire (FRA) | Groupama–FDJ |
| (Italy) GP Capodarco | 1.2U | 16 August 2023 | Matteo Ambrosini (ITA) | MBH Bank CSB Telecom Fort |
| (Estonia) Baltic Chain Tour | 2.2 | 17–20 August 2023 | Rait Ärm (EST) | Van Rysel–Roubaix |
| (Turkey) Grand Prix Kayseri | 1.2 | 19 August 2023 | Anatoliy Budyak (UKR) | Terengganu Cycling Team |
| (Belgium) Druivenkoers Overijse | 1.1 | 19 August 2023 | Victor Campenaerts (BEL) | Lotto–Dstny |
| (Belgium) Egmont Cycling Race | 1.1 | 20 August 2023 | Jasper De Buyst (BEL) | Lotto–Dstny |
| (France) Tour de l'Avenir | 2.NCup | 20–27 August 2023 | Isaac del Toro (MEX) | A.R. Monex Pro Cycling Team |
| (France) Tour Poitou-Charentes en Nouvelle-Aquitaine | 2.1 | 22–25 August 2023 | Søren Wærenskjold (NOR) | Uno-X Pro Cycling Team |
| (Turkey) Tour of Yigido | 2.2 | 25–27 August 2023 | Max Stedman (GBR) | Istanbul Büyükșehir Belediye Spor Türkiye |
| Tour of Bulgaria | 2.2 | 26–31 August 2023 | Michal Schuran (CZE) | ATT Investments |
| (Netherlands) Ronde van de Achterhoek | 1.2 | 27 August 2023 | Martijn Rasenberg (NED) | Parkhotel Valkenburg |
| (Belgium) Muur Classic Geraardsbergen | 1.2 | 30 August 2023 | Filippo Magli (ITA) | Bardiani–CSF 7 Saber |
| (Belgium) Flanders Tomorrow Tour | 2.2U | 31 August – 2 September 2023 | Jakob Söderqvist (SWE) | Sweden (national team) |
| (Italy) Giro della Regione Friuli Venezia Giulia | 2.2 | 31 August – 3 September 2023 | Francesco Galimberti (ITA) | Biesse–Carrera |

=== September ===
Races in the 2023 UCI Europe Tour
| Race | Rating | Date | Winner | Team |
|---|---|---|---|---|
| (Norway) Lillehammer GP | 1.2 | 2 September 2023 | Christian Lindquist (DEN) | Restaurant Suri–Carl Ras |
| (Bulgaria) In the footsteps of the Romans | 2.2 | 2–3 September 2023 | Filippo Fortin (ITA) | Maloja Pushbikers |
| (France) Grand Prix de Plouay | 1.2 | 3 September 2023 | Pierre Thierry (FRA) | Morbihan Fybolia GOA |
| (Norway) Gylne Gutuer | 1.2 | 3 September 2023 | Andreas Stokbro (DEN) | Leopard TOGT Pro Cycling |
| Tour of Kosovo | 2.2 | 7–9 September 2023 | Nicolò Garibbo (ITA) | Gragnano Sporting Club |
| (Czech Republic) Okolo jižních Čech | 2.2 | 7–10 September 2023 | Martin Solhaug Hansen (NOR) | Uno-X Mobility Development Team |
| (Turkey) Tour of Van | 2.2 | 7–10 September 2023 | Daniil Marukhin (KAZ) | Kazakhstan (national team) |
| (France) Grand Prix de la Somme | 1.2 | 10 September 2023 | Bastien Pichon (FRA) | ESEG Douai |
| (Italy) Giro di Toscana | 1.1 | 13 September 2023 | Pavel Sivakov (FRA) | Ineos Grenadiers |
| (Slovakia) Okolo Slovenska | 2.1 | 13–17 September 2023 | Rémi Cavagna (FRA) | Soudal–Quick-Step |
| (Belgium) Kampioenschap van Vlaanderen | 1.1 | 15 September 2023 | Jasper Philipsen (BEL) | Alpecin–Deceuninck |
| (Italy) Memorial Marco Pantani | 1.1 | 16 September 2023 | Alexey Lutsenko (KAZ) | Astana Qazaqstan Team |
| (Belgium) Gooikse Pijl | 1.1 | 17 September 2023 | Jasper Philipsen (BEL) | Alpecin–Deceuninck |
| (France) Grand Prix d'Isbergues | 1.1 | 17 September 2023 | Matteo Moschetti (ITA) | Q36.5 Pro Cycling Team |
| (Belgium) Grote Prijs Rik Van Looy | 1.2 | 17 September 2023 | Rasmus Bøgh Wallin (DEN) | Restaurant Suri–Carl Ras |
| (Italy) Trofeo Matteotti | 1.1 | 17 September 2023 | Sjoerd Bax (NED) | UAE Team Emirates |
| (Belgium) Omloop van het Houtland | 1.1 | 20 September 2023 | Gerben Thijssen (BEL) | Intermarché–Circus–Wanty |
| (France) Paris–Chauny | 1.1 | 24 September 2023 | Jasper Philipsen (BEL) | Alpecin–Deceuninck |
| (Croatia) CRO Race | 2.1 | 26 September – 1 October 2023 | Orluis Aular (VEN) | Caja Rural–Seguros RGA |
| (Italy) Ruota d'Oro | 1.2U | 26 September | Gil Gelders (BEL) | Soudal–Quick-Step Devo Team |
| (Italy) Coppa Ugo Agostoni | 1.1 | 28 September 2023 | Davide Formolo (ITA) | UAE Team Emirates |
| (Turkey) Tour of Istanbul | 2.2 | 28 September – 1 October 2023 | Gustav Wang (DEN) | Restaurant Suri–Carl Ras |
| (Belgium) Grand Prix Cerami | 1.2 | 30 September 2023 | James Fouché (NZL) | Bolton Equities Black Spoke |

=== October ===
Races in the 2023 UCI Europe Tour
| Race | Rating | Date | Winner | Team |
|---|---|---|---|---|
| (Italy) Piccolo Giro di Lombardia | 1.2U | 1 October 2023 | William Junior Lecerf (BEL) | Soudal–Quick-Step Devo Team |
| (France) Tour de Vendée | 1.1 | 1 October 2023 | Arnaud Démare (FRA) | Arkéa–Samsic |
| (Belgium) Lotto Famenne Ardenne Classic | 1.1 | 1 October 2023 | Arnaud De Lie (BEL) | Lotto–Dstny |
| (Belgium) Binche – Chimay – Binche / Mémorial Frank Vandenbroucke | 1.1 | 3 October 2023 | Luca Mozzato (ITA) | Arkéa–Samsic |
| (Italy) Coppa Città di San Daniele | 1.2 | 3 October 2023 | Archie Ryan (IRL) | Visma–Lease a Bike Development |
| (Netherlands) Visit Friesland Elfsteden Race | 1.1 | 4 October 2023 | Jasper Philipsen (BEL) | Alpecin–Deceuninck |
| (France) Paris–Bourges | 1.1 | 5 October 2023 | Arnaud Démare (FRA) | Arkéa–Samsic |
| (France) Paris–Tours Espoirs | 1.2U | 8 October 2023 | Sakarias Koller Løland (NOR) | Uno-X Mobility Development Team |
| Presidential Tour of Turkey | 2.1 | 8–15 October 2023 | Alexey Lutsenko (KAZ) | Astana Qazaqstan Team |
| (France) Chrono des Nations | 1.1 | 15 October 2023 | Josh Tarling (GBR) | Ineos Grenadiers |
| (France) Chrono des Nations Espoirs | 1.2U | 15 October 2023 | Kacper Gieryk (POL) | JEGG – DJR Academy |
