= Welay Berhe =

Ethiopian cyclist

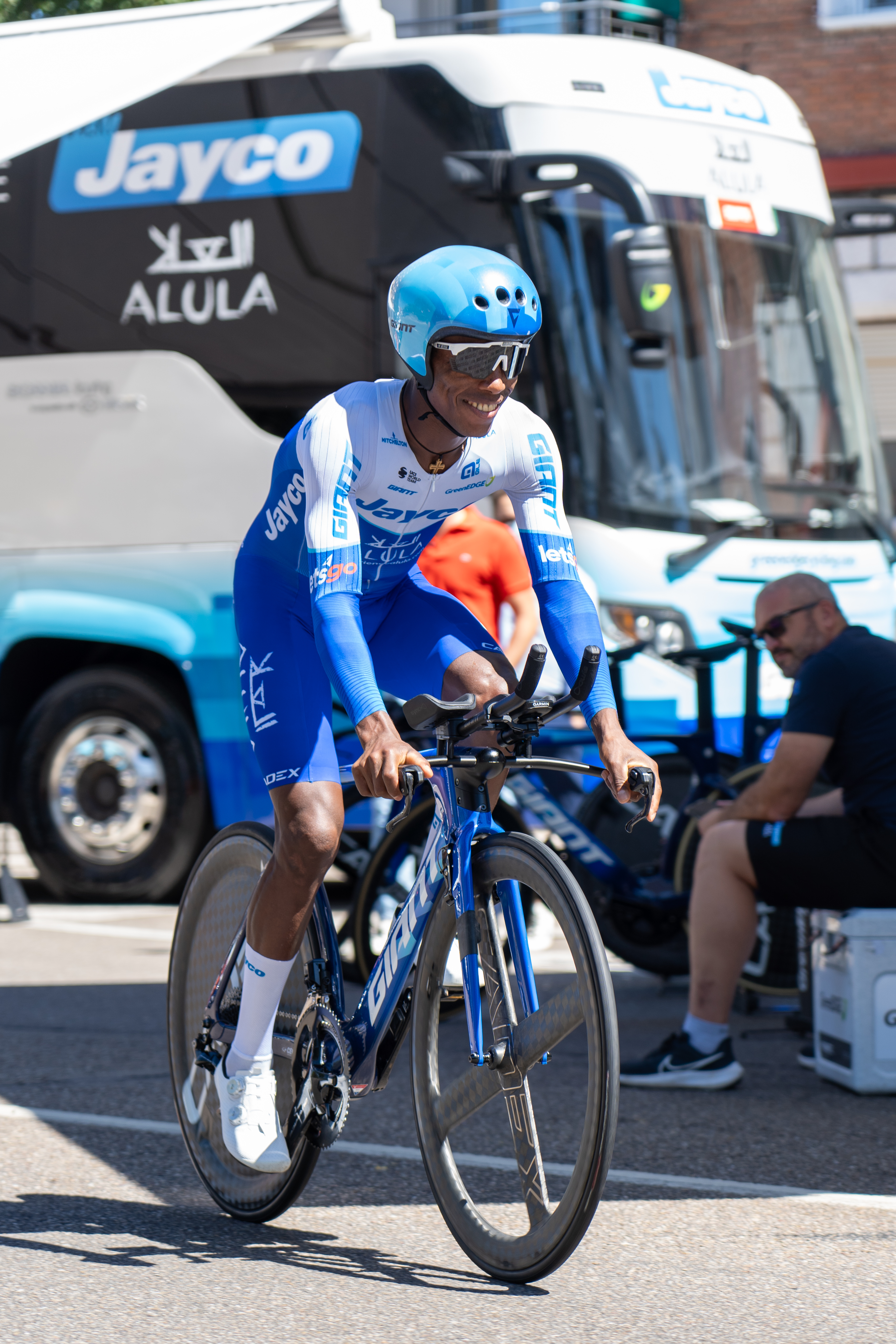
- Berhe at the 2023 Vuelta a España

Personal information
- Full name: Welay Hagos Berhe
- Born: 22 October 2001 (age 24) Ethiopia
- Height: 1.7 m (5 ft 7 in)
- Weight: 58 kg (128 lb)

Cycling career
- Sport: Cycling
- Current team: Team Jayco–AlUla
- Discipline: Road
- Role: Rider

Amateur team
- 2020: Centre Mondial du Cyclisme

Professional teams
- 2021: Nippo–Provence–PTS Conti Until 31/08
- 2022: EF Education–Nippo Development Team
- 2023–: Team Jayco–AlUla

Welay Hagos Berhe (born 22 October 2001) is an Ethiopian racing cyclist, who currently rides for UCI WorldTeam Team Jayco–AlUla.

== Career ==
After leaving Nippo–Provence–PTS Conti in August 2021 he rejoined the team for the 2022 season. Berhe spent Stages 2 and 3 of the Istrian Spring Trophy in the break-away. In Stage 2 he won the six mountain points on the final climb of the day, then on stage 3 while in the break he won the first mountain sprint and secured himself the Mountain jersey. At the Tour de l'Avenir Berhe crashed during the sprint for Stage 6 after a Norwegian rider fell in front of him. Berhe continued the race with minor injuries. Berhe signed a three-year deal to ride for UCI WorldTeam Team Jayco–AlUla from 2023.

== Major results ==
2018
1st Time trial, National Junior Road Championships
2019
African Junior Road Championships

1st Team time trial
1st Time trial
4th Road race

1st Time trial, National Junior Road Championships
2022
1st Grand Prix Crevoisier
1st Radklassiker Chur-Arosa
1st Mountains classification, Istrian Spring Trophy
4th Piccolo Giro di Lombardia
4th GP de la Pédale Romande
4th GP Cham-Hagendorn
6th Grand Prix L'Echappée
6th GP Vorarlberg
7th Overall Giro della Valle d'Aosta
8th Tour du Jura Suisse
2023
6th Overall Tour of Austria
9th Overall Vuelta a Castilla y León
2024
10th Overall Volta a la Comunitat Valenciana

=== Grand Tour general classification results timeline ===
Grand Tour	2023	2024
Giro d'Italia	—	—
Tour de France	—	—
Vuelta a España	DNF	DNF
