= Pavel Sivakov =

French cyclist (born 1997)

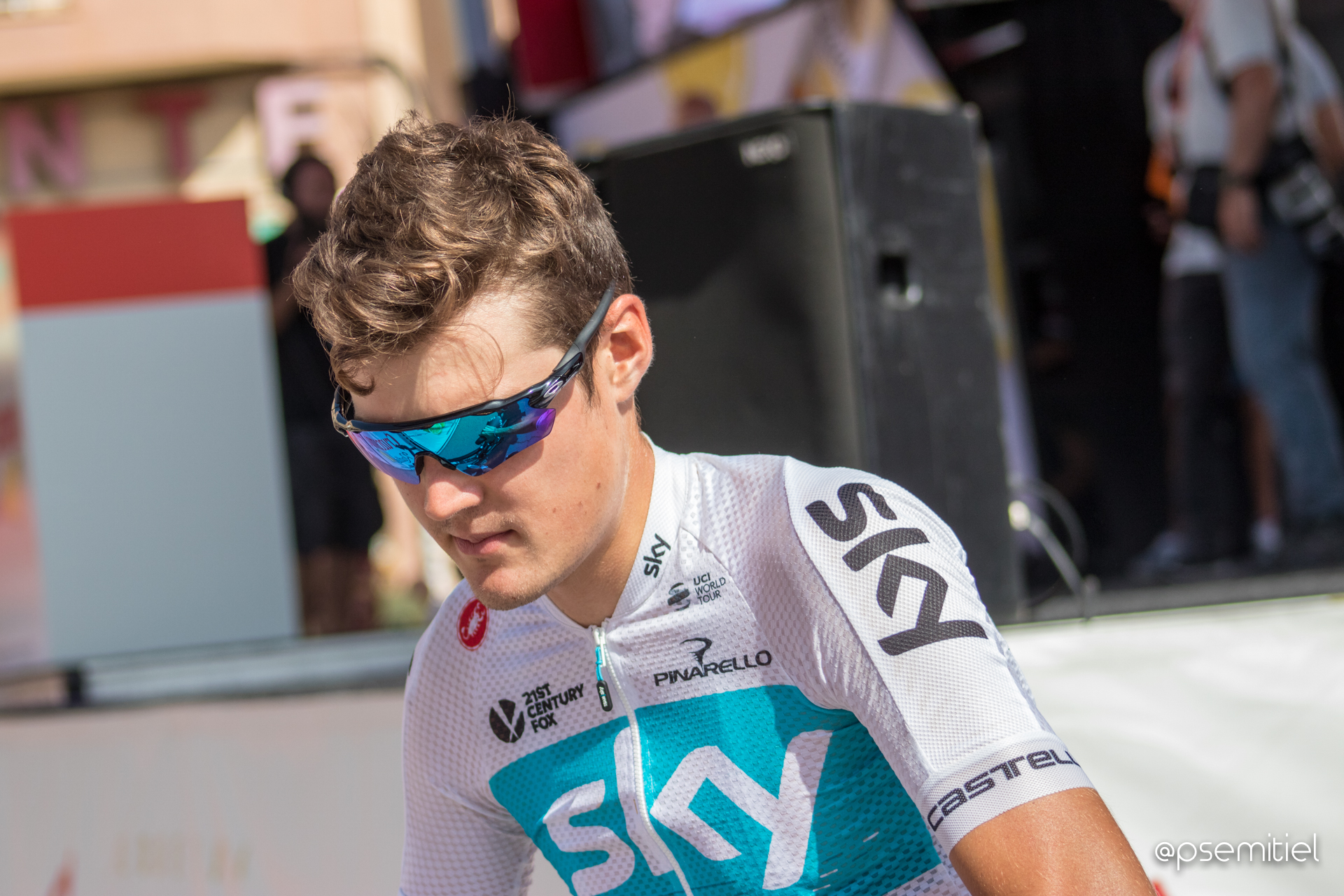
- Sivakov at the 2018 Vuelta a España

Personal information
- Full name: Pavel Alekseyevich Sivakov
- Born: 11 July 1997 (age 29) San Donà di Piave, Italy
- Height: 188 cm (6 ft 2 in)

Cycling career
- Sport: Cycling
- Current team: UAE Team Emirates XRG
- Discipline: Road
- Role: Rider
- Rider type: Climber

Amateur teams
- 2014–2015: Intégrale Bicycle Club Isle Jourdain Junior
- 2016–2017: BMC Development Team

Professional teams
- 2018–2023: Team Sky
- 2024–: UAE Team Emirates

Major wins
- Stage races Tour de Pologne (2019) Tour of the Alps (2019) Vuelta a Burgos (2022) Vuelta a Andalucía (2025)
Medal record
Men's road bicycle racing
Representing France
World Championships
Silver medal – second place	2025 Kigali	Mixed team relay

Pavel Alekseyevich Sivakov (Павел Алексеевич Сиваков; born 11 July 1997) is a French cyclist who currently rides for UCI WorldTeam UAE Team Emirates XRG. He was born in Italy to Russian parents who subsequently moved to France, and switched his sporting allegiance from Russia to France in 2022. He has six professional cycling victories including a general classification win on the UCI World Tour at the 2019 Tour de Pologne.

== Personal life ==
Sivakov is the son of Russian former cyclists Alexei Sivakov and Aleksandra Koliaseva. He was born in Italy, but grew up in Soueich, Haute Garonne in France. Sivakov started competing for Russia. In March 2022, he changed his cycling nationality to France, due to his opposition to the 2022 Russian invasion of Ukraine.

== Career ==
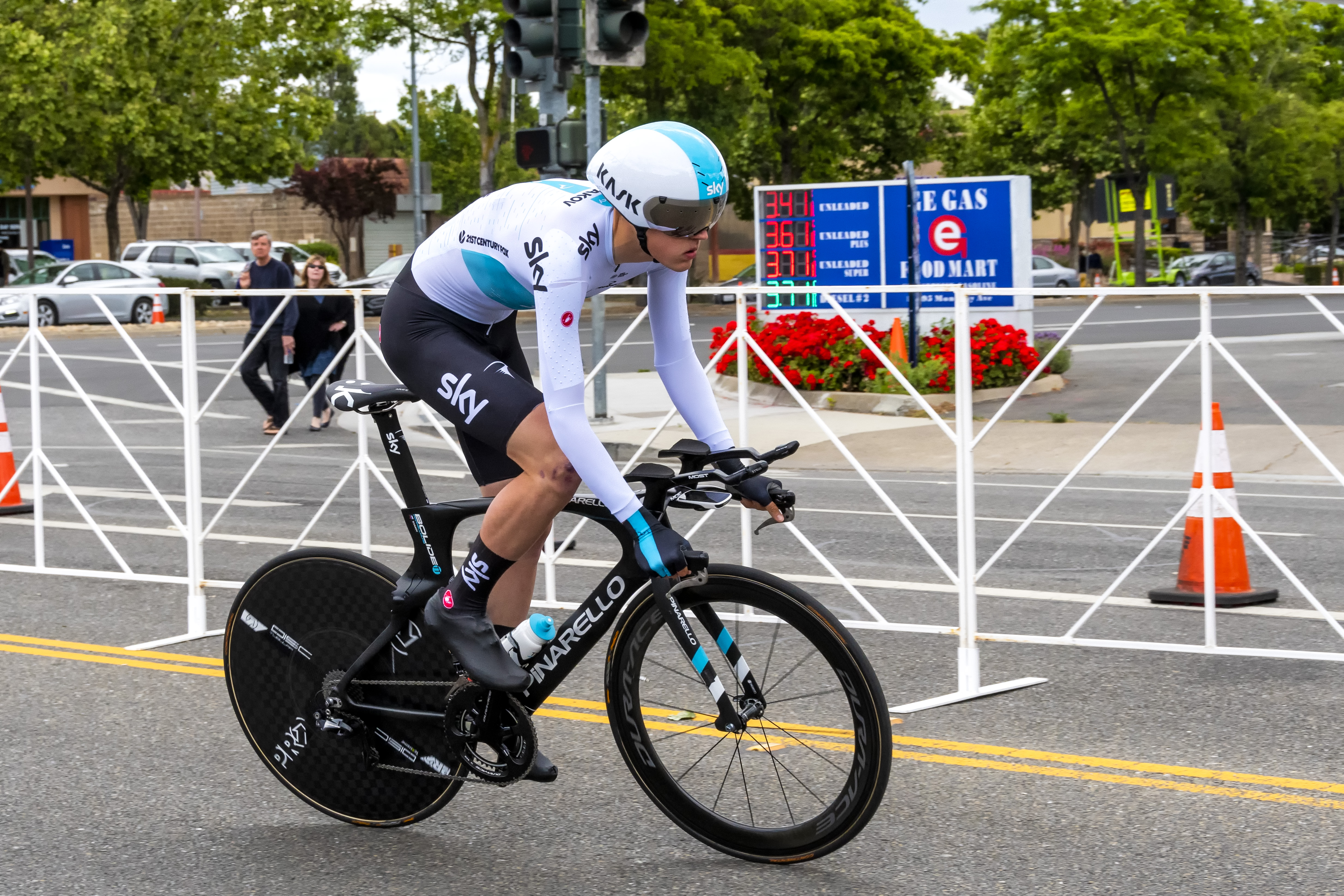
Sivakov at the 2018 Tour of California

In August 2017 it was announced that Sivakov would turn professional with Team Sky, joining the team on a three-year contract from 2018.

In April 2019, Sivakov won Stage 2 of the Tour of the Alps, his first professional victory. He held the race lead for the rest of the race, taking overall victory by 27 seconds ahead of teammate Tao Geoghegan Hart.

In the 2019 Giro d'Italia, Sivakov finished 9th overall.

Sivakov took overall victory at the 2019 Tour de Pologne after a second place on the first mountain stage and a finish among the peloton on the final stage. Sivakov took the leader's jersey after the last stage, after previous leader Jonas Vingegaard suffered larger losses. Sivakov finished ahead of Jai Hindley of Team Sunweb on the sixth stage and overtook the Australian by two seconds, thanks to time bonuses.

Sivakov also won the Vuelta Burgos in 2022, Giro della Toscana in 2023 and Vuelta a Andalucia Ruta Ciclista Del Sol in 2025.

== Major results ==
2014
1st Overall Ronde des Vallées

1st Stage 1

2nd Overall Grand Prix Rüebliland
2015
1st Time trial, National Junior Road Championships
1st Overall Oberösterreich Juniorenrundfahrt

1st Points classification
1st Stage 2

1st Tour of Flanders Juniors
3rd Overall Internationale Niedersachsen-Rundfahrt
2016
1st Stage 1 (TTT) Giro della Valle d'Aosta
1st Prologue (TTT) Tour de Berlin
2nd Liège–Bastogne–Liège Espoirs
2nd Overall Olympia's Tour

1st Young rider classification

2017
1st Overall Ronde de l'Isard

1st Young rider classification
1st Stages 2 & 4

1st Overall Giro della Valle d'Aosta

1st Stage 3

1st Overall Giro Ciclistico d'Italia

1st Young rider classification

Tour de l'Avenir

1st Mountains classification
1st Stage 9

1st Mountains classification, Tour de Normandie
2nd Overall Olympia's Tour
2018
2nd Time trial, National Road Championships
4th Overall Settimana Internazionale di Coppi e Bartali

1st Young rider classification
1st Stage 1b (TTT)

2019 (3 pro wins)
1st Overall Tour of the Alps

1st Young rider classification
1st Stage 2

1st Overall Tour de Pologne
4th Overall Tour of Britain
8th Overall Herald Sun Tour

1st Young rider classification

8th Overall Route d'Occitanie
9th Overall Giro d'Italia

Held after Stages 13–15

2020
1st Young rider classification, Tour Down Under
2nd Overall Route d'Occitanie
2nd Cadel Evans Great Ocean Road Race
2021
4th Overall Vuelta a Burgos
6th Overall Tour of the Alps
9th Road race, UEC European Road Championships
Vuelta a España

Held after Stage 7–8

2022 (1)
1st Overall Vuelta a Burgos
2nd Clásica de San Sebastián
9th Overall Volta a la Comunitat Valenciana
10th Overall Tour of the Alps
2023 (1)
1st Giro della Toscana
2nd Grand Prix Cycliste de Montréal
2nd Coppa Sabatini
3rd Memorial Marco Pantani
4th Overall Deutschland Tour
5th Overall Tour of Austria
5th Overall Étoile de Bessèges
7th Overall Tour of the Alps
9th Overall Paris–Nice
10th Overall Vuelta a Andalucía
2024 (1)
2nd Overall Giro d'Abruzzo

1st Stage 4

5th Overall Tour of Guangxi
6th Giro di Lombardia
6th Coppa Bernocchi
9th Overall Vuelta a España
2025 (1)
1st Overall Vuelta a Andalucía
2nd Team relay, UCI Road World Championships
2nd Grand Prix Cycliste de Québec
6th Trofeo Tessile & Moda
8th Road race, UEC European Road Championships
10th Overall Tour of Britain
2026
3rd Veneto Classic
Combativity award Stage 9 Vuelta a España

=== Grand Tour general classification results timeline ===
Grand Tour general classification results
Grand Tour	2018	2019	2020	2021	2022	2023	2024
Giro d'Italia	—	9	—	DNF	16	DNF	—
Tour de France	—	—	87	—	—	—	32
Vuelta a España	DNF	—	—	35	DNF	—	9
Major stage race general classification results
Race	2018	2019	2020	2021	2022	2023	2024
Paris–Nice	—	—	—	—	—	9	—
Tirreno–Adriatico	—	—	—	19	—	—	—
Volta a Catalunya	—	30	NH	—	DNF	—	85
Tour of the Basque Country	DNF	—	NH	—	—	—	—
Tour de Romandie	53	—	NH	—	—	—	18
Critérium du Dauphiné	—	—	11	—	—	—	DNF
Tour de Suisse	14	—	NH	46	—	—	—

Legend
—	Did not compete
DNF	Did not finish
IP	Race in Progress
