= Luca Vergallito =

Italian cyclist (born 1997)

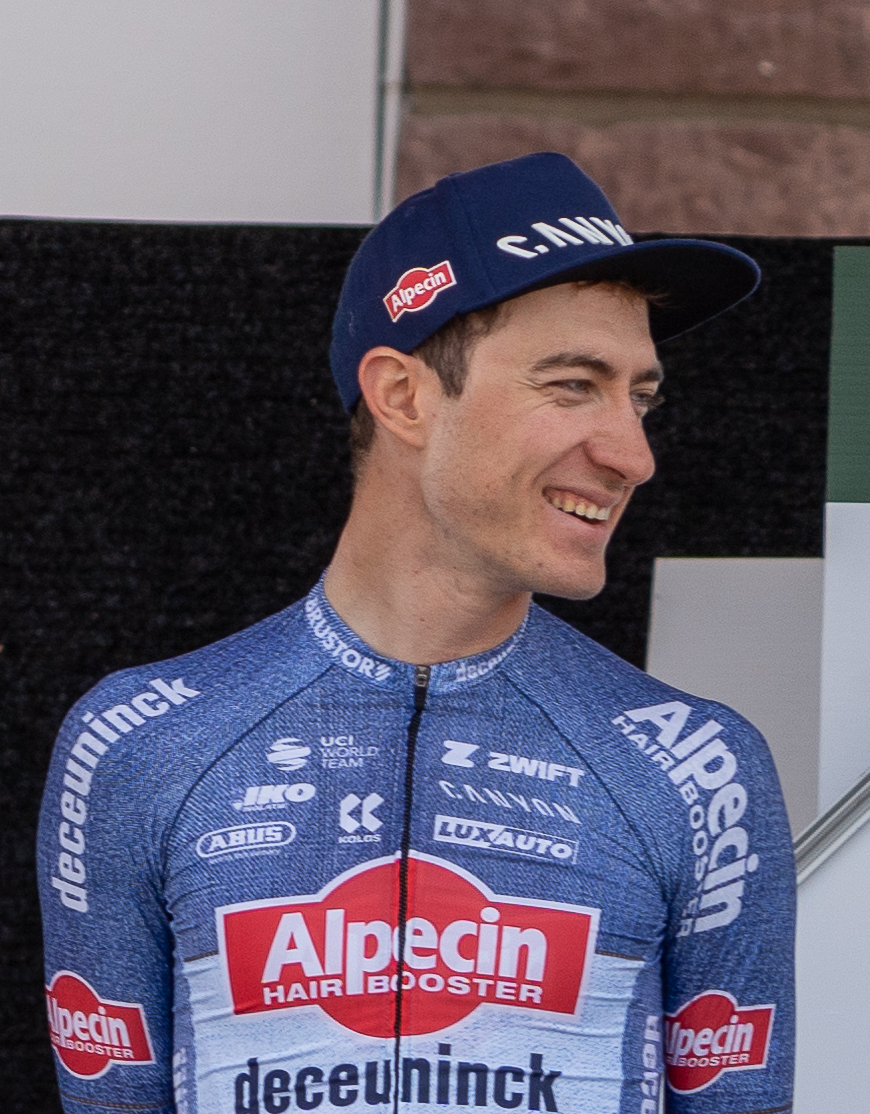
- Vergallito at the 2024 Tour of the Basque Country

Personal information
- Nickname: Il Bandito
- Born: 14 September 1997 (age 29) Milan, Italy
- Height: 1.9 m (6 ft 3 in)
- Weight: 67 kg (148 lb)

Cycling career
- Sport: Cycling
- Current team: Alpecin–Premier Tech
- Discipline: Road
- Role: Rider
- Rider type: Climber

Amateur teams
- 2014: Team Giorgi ASD
- 2016: Named Sport–Kemo
- 2017: Overall Cycling Team

Professional teams
- 2023: Alpecin–Deceuninck Development Team
- 2024–: Alpecin–Deceuninck

Luca Vergallito (born 14 September 1997), nicknamed Il Bandito is an Italian cyclist, who currently rides for UCI WorldTeam Alpecin–Premier Tech. He turned professional in 2022 after being awarded a contract from winning the 2022 Zwift Academy.

== Education and career ==
Vergallito graduated in 2020 with a degree in sports science at the University of Milan, and he is currently pursuing a master's degree in exercise physiology and training methods, also at the University of Milan.

Vergallito started as a track and field athlete, before transitioning to triathlon and then to road cycling, where he raced two years as an U-23 cyclist, before temporarily quitting racing to focus on his studies. He then went pro in 2022 after winning a contract from the Zwift Academy, currently riding for UCI WorldTeam Alpecin-Premier Tech.

== Major results ==
2023
1st Overall Oberösterreich Rundfahrt

1st Stage 3

1st Overall Province Cycling Tour

1st Stage 1

6th Flèche Ardennaise
8th Overall Tour of Austria
10th Overall Giro della Regione Friuli Venezia Giulia

1st Mountains classification
1st Stage 3

=== Grand Tour general classification results timeline ===
Grand Tour	2024	2025	2026
Giro d'Italia	—	—	91
Tour de France	—	—	—
Vuelta a España	105	DNF	—

Legend
—	Did not compete
DNF	Did not finish
