= 2021 Tour of the Alps =

2021 UCI Europe Tour 2021 UCI ProSeries

Race details
- Dates: 19–23 April 2021
- Stages: 5
- Distance: 713.6 km (443.4 mi)
- Winning time: 18h 36' 06"

Results
| Jersey awarded to the overall winner | Winner | Simon Yates (GBR) | (Team BikeExchange) |
| | Second | Pello Bilbao (ESP) | (Team Bahrain Victorious) |
| | Third | Aleksandr Vlasov (RUS) | (Astana–Premier Tech) |
| Jersey awarded to the mountains classification winner | Mountains | Alessandro De Marchi (ITA) | (Israel Start-Up Nation) |
| Jersey awarded to the young rider classification winner | Young rider | Jefferson Alexander Cepeda (ECU) | (Androni Giocattoli–Sidermec) |
| Jersey awarded to the sprints classification winner | Sprints | Felix Engelhardt (GER) | (Tirol KTM Cycling Team) |
| | Team | INEOS Grenadiers | |

The 2021 Tour of the Alps was the 44th edition of the Tour of the Alps road cycling stage race and the fifth edition since its renaming from the Giro del Trentino. It was held from 19 to 23 April 2021 in the Austrian state of Tyrol and in the Italian provinces of Trentino and South Tyrol, which all make up the Euroregion of Tyrol–South Tyrol–Trentino. The 2.Pro-category race was initially scheduled to be a part of the inaugural edition of the UCI ProSeries, but after the 2020 edition was cancelled due to the COVID-19 pandemic, it made its UCI ProSeries debut in 2021, while also still being a part of the 2021 UCI Europe Tour.

== Teams ==
Thirteen of the nineteen UCI WorldTeams, seven UCI ProTeams, and one UCI Continental team made up the twenty-one teams that participated in the race. UCI ProTeam Vini Zabù was originally invited to participate, but they imposed a self-suspension on racing after one of their riders received a positive anti-doping test. Teams were allowed to field up a maximum of seven riders each, but four teams (Androni Giocattoli–Sidermec, Caja Rural–Seguros RGA, Trek–Segafredo, and UAE Team Emirates) each decided to only field six, for a total of 143 riders. Of this number, there were 116 finishers.

UCI WorldTeams

- AG2R Citroën Team
- Astana–Premier Tech
- Bora–Hansgrohe
- EF Education–Nippo
- Groupama–FDJ
- INEOS Grenadiers
- Israel Start-Up Nation
- Team Bahrain Victorious
- Team BikeExchange
- Team DSM
- Team Qhubeka Assos
- Trek–Segafredo
- UAE Team Emirates

UCI ProTeams

- Androni Giocattoli–Sidermec
- Arkéa–Samsic
- Bardiani–CSF–Faizanè
- Caja Rural–Seguros RGA
- Eolo–Kometa
- Gazprom–RusVelo
- Uno-X Pro Cycling Team
- ~~Vini Zabù~~

UCI Continental Teams

- Tirol KTM Cycling Team

== Route ==
The five-day stage race started on 19 April and finished on 23 April, covering 713.6 km (443.4 mi) and around 13,650 m (44,780 ft) of elevation. The race began in Brixen in South Tyrol, Italy and traveled north to cross the border into Tyrol, Austria for the remainder of stage 1 and the entirety of stage 2. On stage 3, the race once again crossed the border to head back down south into South Tyrol. Stage 4 saw the race continue to head south into Trentino, where the race finished in Riva del Garda on stage 5.

Stage characteristics and winners
| Stage | Date | Route | Distance | Type | Winner |
|---|---|---|---|---|---|
| 1 | 19 April | Brixen/Bressanone (Italy) to Innsbruck (Austria) | 140.6 km (87.4 mi) | Hilly stage | Gianni Moscon (ITA) |
| 2 | 20 April | Innsbruck (Austria) to Feichten im Kaunertal (Austria) | 121.5 km (75.5 mi) | Mountain stage | Simon Yates (GBR) |
| 3 | 21 April | Imst (Austria) to Naturns/Naturno (Italy) | 162 km (101 mi) | Mountain stage | Gianni Moscon (ITA) |
| 4 | 22 April | Naturns/Naturno (Italy) to Valle del Chiese (Pieve di Bono) (Italy) | 168.6 km (104.8 mi) | Mountain stage | Pello Bilbao (ESP) |
| 5 | 23 April | Valle del Chiese (Idroland) (Italy) to Riva del Garda (Italy) | 120.9 km (75.1 mi) | Medium mountain stage | Felix Großschartner (AUT) |
| Total | | | 713.6 km (443.4 mi) | | |

== Stages ==
=== Stage 1 ===
19 April 2021 — Brixen/Bressanone to Innsbruck, 140.6 km (87.4 mi)

Stage 1 Result
| Rank | Rider | Team | Time |
|---|---|---|---|
| 1 | Gianni Moscon (ITA) | INEOS Grenadiers | 3h 29' 24" |
| 2 | Idar Andersen (NOR) | Uno-X Pro Cycling Team | + 0" |
| 3 | Alexandr Riabushenko (BLR) | UAE Team Emirates | + 0" |
| 4 | Fabio Felline (ITA) | Astana–Premier Tech | + 0" |
| 5 | Nick Schultz (AUS) | Team BikeExchange | + 0" |
| 6 | Enrico Battaglin (ITA) | Bardiani–CSF–Faizanè | + 0" |
| 7 | Gianluca Brambilla (ITA) | Trek–Segafredo | + 0" |
| 8 | Ruben Guerreiro (POR) | EF Education–Nippo | + 0" |
| 9 | Natnael Tesfatsion (ERI) | Androni Giocattoli–Sidermec | + 0" |
| 10 | Reinardt Janse van Rensburg (RSA) | Team Qhubeka Assos | + 0" |

General classification after Stage 1
| Rank | Rider | Team | Time |
|---|---|---|---|
| 1 | Gianni Moscon (ITA) | INEOS Grenadiers | 3h 29' 14" |
| 2 | Idar Andersen (NOR) | Uno-X Pro Cycling Team | + 4" |
| 3 | Alexandr Riabushenko (BLR) | UAE Team Emirates | + 6" |
| 4 | Fabio Felline (ITA) | Astana–Premier Tech | + 10" |
| 5 | Nick Schultz (AUS) | Team BikeExchange | + 10" |
| 6 | Enrico Battaglin (ITA) | Bardiani–CSF–Faizanè | + 10" |
| 7 | Gianluca Brambilla (ITA) | Trek–Segafredo | + 10" |
| 8 | Ruben Guerreiro (POR) | EF Education–Nippo | + 10" |
| 9 | Natnael Tesfatsion (ERI) | Androni Giocattoli–Sidermec | + 10" |
| 10 | Reinardt Janse van Rensburg (RSA) | Team Qhubeka Assos | + 10" |

=== Stage 2 ===
20 April 2021 — Innsbruck to Feichten im Kaunertal, 121.5 km (75.5 mi)

Stage 2 Result
| Rank | Rider | Team | Time |
|---|---|---|---|
| 1 | Simon Yates (GBR) | Team BikeExchange | 3h 17' 42" |
| 2 | Pavel Sivakov (RUS) | INEOS Grenadiers | + 41" |
| 3 | Dan Martin (IRL) | Israel Start-Up Nation | + 58" |
| 4 | Aleksandr Vlasov (RUS) | Astana–Premier Tech | + 58" |
| 5 | Jefferson Alexander Cepeda (ECU) | Androni Giocattoli–Sidermec | + 58" |
| 6 | Jai Hindley (AUS) | Team DSM | + 1' 17" |
| 7 | Hugh Carthy (GBR) | EF Education–Nippo | + 1' 17" |
| 8 | Nick Schultz (AUS) | Team BikeExchange | + 1' 42" |
| 9 | Romain Bardet (FRA) | Team DSM | + 1' 42" |
| 10 | Ruben Guerreiro (POR) | EF Education–Nippo | + 1' 42" |

General classification after Stage 2
| Rank | Rider | Team | Time |
|---|---|---|---|
| 1 | Simon Yates (GBR) | Team BikeExchange | 6h 46' 56" |
| 2 | Pavel Sivakov (RUS) | INEOS Grenadiers | + 45" |
| 3 | Dan Martin (IRL) | Israel Start-Up Nation | + 1' 04" |
| 4 | Aleksandr Vlasov (RUS) | Astana–Premier Tech | + 1' 08" |
| 5 | Jefferson Alexander Cepeda (ECU) | Androni Giocattoli–Sidermec | + 1' 08" |
| 6 | Jai Hindley (AUS) | Team DSM | + 1' 27" |
| 7 | Hugh Carthy (GBR) | EF Education–Nippo | + 1' 27" |
| 8 | Nick Schultz (AUS) | Team BikeExchange | + 1' 52" |
| 9 | Ruben Guerreiro (POR) | EF Education–Nippo | + 1' 52" |
| 10 | Pello Bilbao (ESP) | Team Bahrain Victorious | + 1' 52" |

=== Stage 3 ===
21 April 2021 — Imst to Naturns/Naturno, 162 km (101 mi)

Stage 3 Result
| Rank | Rider | Team | Time |
|---|---|---|---|
| 1 | Gianni Moscon (ITA) | INEOS Grenadiers | 4h 04' 25" |
| 2 | Felix Großschartner (AUT) | Bora–Hansgrohe | + 0" |
| 3 | Michael Storer (AUS) | Team DSM | + 1" |
| 4 | Matteo Fabbro (ITA) | Bora–Hansgrohe | + 1" |
| 5 | Alessandro De Marchi (ITA) | Israel Start-Up Nation | + 1" |
| 6 | Antonio Nibali (ITA) | Trek–Segafredo | + 1" |
| 7 | François Bidard (FRA) | AG2R Citroën Team | + 1" |
| 8 | Pello Bilbao (ESP) | Team Bahrain Victorious | + 1" |
| 9 | Luis León Sánchez (ESP) | Astana–Premier Tech | + 1" |
| 10 | Hermann Pernsteiner (AUT) | Team Bahrain Victorious | + 13" |

General classification after Stage 3
| Rank | Rider | Team | Time |
|---|---|---|---|
| 1 | Simon Yates (GBR) | Team BikeExchange | 10h 52' 10" |
| 2 | Pavel Sivakov (RUS) | INEOS Grenadiers | + 45" |
| 3 | Pello Bilbao (ESP) | Team Bahrain Victorious | + 1' 04" |
| 4 | Dan Martin (IRL) | Israel Start-Up Nation | + 1' 04" |
| 5 | Aleksandr Vlasov (RUS) | Astana–Premier Tech | + 1' 08" |
| 6 | Jefferson Alexander Cepeda (ECU) | Androni Giocattoli–Sidermec | + 1' 08" |
| 7 | Jai Hindley (AUS) | Team DSM | + 1' 27" |
| 8 | Hugh Carthy (GBR) | EF Education–Nippo | + 1' 27" |
| 9 | Ruben Guerreiro (POR) | EF Education–Nippo | + 1' 52" |
| 10 | Nick Schultz (AUS) | Team BikeExchange | + 1' 52" |

=== Stage 4 ===
22 April 2021 — Naturns/Naturno to Valle del Chiese (Pieve di Bono), 168.6 km (104.8 mi)

Stage 4 Result
| Rank | Rider | Team | Time |
|---|---|---|---|
| 1 | Pello Bilbao (ESP) | Team Bahrain Victorious | 4h 39' 42" |
| 2 | Aleksandr Vlasov (RUS) | Astana–Premier Tech | + 0" |
| 3 | Simon Yates (GBR) | Team BikeExchange | + 0" |
| 4 | Nairo Quintana (COL) | Arkéa–Samsic | + 58" |
| 5 | Jefferson Alexander Cepeda (ECU) | Androni Giocattoli–Sidermec | + 1' 06" |
| 6 | Hugh Carthy (GBR) | EF Education–Nippo | + 1' 06" |
| 7 | Ruben Guerreiro (POR) | EF Education–Nippo | + 1' 16" |
| 8 | Romain Bardet (FRA) | Team DSM | + 1' 16" |
| 9 | Gianluca Brambilla (ITA) | Trek–Segafredo | + 1' 16" |
| 10 | Matteo Fabbro (ITA) | Bora–Hansgrohe | + 1' 22" |

General classification after Stage 4
| Rank | Rider | Team | Time |
|---|---|---|---|
| 1 | Simon Yates (GBR) | Team BikeExchange | 15h 31' 48" |
| 2 | Pello Bilbao (ESP) | Team Bahrain Victorious | + 58" |
| 3 | Aleksandr Vlasov (RUS) | Astana–Premier Tech | + 1' 06" |
| 4 | Jefferson Alexander Cepeda (ECU) | Androni Giocattoli–Sidermec | + 2' 18" |
| 5 | Pavel Sivakov (RUS) | INEOS Grenadiers | + 2' 37" |
| 6 | Hugh Carthy (GBR) | EF Education–Nippo | + 2' 37" |
| 7 | Nairo Quintana (COL) | Arkéa–Samsic | + 2' 54" |
| 8 | Ruben Guerreiro (POR) | EF Education–Nippo | + 3' 12" |
| 9 | Romain Bardet (FRA) | Team DSM | + 3' 12" |
| 10 | Nick Schultz (AUS) | Team BikeExchange | + 3' 36" |

=== Stage 5 ===
23 April 2021 — Valle del Chiese (Idroland) to Riva del Garda, 120.9 km (75.1 mi)

Stage 5 Result
| Rank | Rider | Team | Time |
|---|---|---|---|
| 1 | Felix Großschartner (AUT) | Bora–Hansgrohe | 3h 03' 38" |
| 2 | Nicolas Roche (IRL) | Team DSM | + 34" |
| 3 | Alessandro De Marchi (ITA) | Israel Start-Up Nation | + 34" |
| 4 | Gianni Moscon (ITA) | INEOS Grenadiers | + 40" |
| 5 | Alejandro Osorio (COL) | Caja Rural–Seguros RGA | + 40" |
| 6 | Romain Bardet (FRA) | Team DSM | + 40" |
| 7 | Luis León Sánchez (ESP) | Astana–Premier Tech | + 40" |
| 8 | Ruben Guerreiro (POR) | EF Education–Nippo | + 40" |
| 9 | Mark Padun (UKR) | Team Bahrain Victorious | + 40" |
| 10 | Matteo Fabbro (ITA) | Bora–Hansgrohe | + 40" |

General classification after Stage 5
| Rank | Rider | Team | Time |
|---|---|---|---|
| 1 | Simon Yates (GBR) | Team BikeExchange | 18h 36' 06" |
| 2 | Pello Bilbao (ESP) | Team Bahrain Victorious | + 58" |
| 3 | Aleksandr Vlasov (RUS) | Astana–Premier Tech | + 1' 06" |
| 4 | Jefferson Alexander Cepeda (ECU) | Androni Giocattoli–Sidermec | + 2' 25" |
| 5 | Hugh Carthy (GBR) | EF Education–Nippo | + 2' 37" |
| 6 | Pavel Sivakov (RUS) | INEOS Grenadiers | + 2' 44" |
| 7 | Nairo Quintana (COL) | Arkéa–Samsic | + 2' 54" |
| 8 | Ruben Guerreiro (POR) | EF Education–Nippo | + 3' 12" |
| 9 | Romain Bardet (FRA) | Team DSM | + 3' 12" |
| 10 | Nick Schultz (AUS) | Team BikeExchange | + 3' 36" |

== Classification leadership table ==
In the 2021 Tour of the Alps, there were five classifications, of which four had jerseys awarded to the leaders and winners; the colors of each jersey were derived from the company that sponsored each jersey. The general classification (GC) ultimately decided which rider won the overall race, and was calculated by adding up each rider's finishing time on each stage and deducting any bonus seconds accrued. For each stage, the top three finishers got ten, six, and four bonus seconds, respectively, taken off their GC time. The rider with the fastest time after each stage and at the end of the race wore the yellow jersey, sponsored by Italian apple-producing consortium Melinda.

Mountains classification points
| Type | 1 | 2 | 3 | 4 | 5 |
|---|---|---|---|---|---|
| Points for Category | 10 | 8 | 6 | 4 | 2 |
| Points for Category | 6 | 4 | 2 | 0 | |
| Points for Category | 3 | 2 | 1 | 0 | |

The second classification was the mountains classification. Points were accumulated by being one of the first riders to summit certain climbs, which were marked as either third, second, and first-category climbs, in order of increasing difficulty. Each of the five stages had two designated climbs with points on offer; of these ten climbs, three were first-category, five were second-category, and two were third-category, for a maximum of 66 points that could be obtained by any one rider. The rider who accumulated the most mountains classification points after each stage and at the end of the race wore the light blue jersey, sponsored by Italian bank Gruppo Cassa Centrale.

The young rider classification was based on and calculated the same way as the general classification, although only under-23 riders, born on or after 1 January 1998, were eligible to contest this ranking. The highest placed under-23 rider in the GC after each stage and at the end of the race wore the white jersey, sponsored by the Austrian branch of the safety and workwear clothing manufacturer Würth Modyf.

The other points-based classification was the sprints classification. Each of the five stages featured one intermediate sprint, which offered six, four, and two points, respectively, to the first three riders to cross the sprint line, for a maximum of 30 points that could be obtained by any one rider. The rider who accumulated the most sprints classification points after each stage and at the end of the race wore the red jersey, sponsored by Italian sports news company PMG Sport.

The fifth and last classification was the team classification. For this classification, the times of the first three finishers for each team were added together, and the leading team after each stage and at the end of the race was the team with the lowest cumulative time. No special jerseys or jersey numbers were awarded to the leaders and winners of this classification.

Classification leadership by stage
| Stage | Winner | General classification | Mountains classification | Young rider classification | Sprints classification | Team classification |
|---|---|---|---|---|---|---|
| 1 | Gianni Moscon | Gianni Moscon | Alessandro De Marchi | Idar Andersen | Felix Engelhardt | Bardiani–CSF–Faizanè |
| 2 | Simon Yates | Simon Yates | Simon Yates | Jefferson Alexander Cepeda | Felix Engelhardt | Team BikeExchange |
| 3 | Gianni Moscon | Simon Yates | Alessandro De Marchi | Jefferson Alexander Cepeda | Felix Engelhardt | INEOS Grenadiers |
| 4 | Pello Bilbao | Simon Yates | Márton Dina | Jefferson Alexander Cepeda | Felix Engelhardt | INEOS Grenadiers |
| 5 | Felix Großschartner | Simon Yates | Alessandro De Marchi | Jefferson Alexander Cepeda | Felix Engelhardt | INEOS Grenadiers |
| Final | | Simon Yates | Alessandro De Marchi | Jefferson Alexander Cepeda | Felix Engelhardt | INEOS Grenadiers |

- On stage 3, Alessandro De Marchi, who was second in the mountains classification, wore the light blue jersey, because first-placed Simon Yates wore the green jersey as the leader of the general classification.

== Final classification standings ==
Legend
| Denotes the winner of the general classification | Denotes the winner of the young rider classification |
| Denotes the winner of the mountains classification | Denotes the winner of the sprints classification |

=== General classification ===
Final general classification (1–10)
| Rank | Rider | Team | Time |
|---|---|---|---|
| 1 | Simon Yates (GBR) | Team BikeExchange | 18h 36' 06" |
| 2 | Pello Bilbao (ESP) | Team Bahrain Victorious | + 58" |
| 3 | Aleksandr Vlasov (RUS) | Astana–Premier Tech | + 1' 06" |
| 4 | Jefferson Alexander Cepeda (ECU) | Androni Giocattoli–Sidermec | + 2' 25" |
| 5 | Hugh Carthy (GBR) | EF Education–Nippo | + 2' 37" |
| 6 | Pavel Sivakov (RUS) | INEOS Grenadiers | + 2' 44" |
| 7 | Nairo Quintana (COL) | Arkéa–Samsic | + 2' 54" |
| 8 | Ruben Guerreiro (POR) | EF Education–Nippo | + 3' 12" |
| 9 | Romain Bardet (FRA) | Team DSM | + 3' 12" |
| 10 | Nick Schultz (AUS) | Team BikeExchange | + 3' 36" |

=== Mountains classification ===
Final mountains classification (1–10)
| Rank | Rider | Team | Points |
|---|---|---|---|
| 1 | Alessandro De Marchi (ITA) | Israel Start-Up Nation | 25 |
| 2 | Márton Dina (HUN) | Eolo–Kometa | 16 |
| 3 | Simon Yates (GBR) | Team BikeExchange | 14 |
| 4 | Reuben Thompson (NZL) | Groupama–FDJ | 10 |
| 5 | Thibaut Pinot (FRA) | Groupama–FDJ | 10 |
| 6 | Aleksandr Vlasov (RUS) | Astana–Premier Tech | 8 |
| 7 | Pavel Sivakov (RUS) | INEOS Grenadiers | 8 |
| 8 | Chris Froome (GBR) | Israel Start-Up Nation | 8 |
| 9 | Georg Steinhauser (GER) | Tirol KTM Cycling Team | 6 |
| 10 | Nairo Quintana (COL) | Arkéa–Samsic | 6 |

=== Young rider classification ===
Final young rider classification (1–10)
| Rank | Rider | Team | Time |
|---|---|---|---|
| 1 | Jefferson Alexander Cepeda (ECU) | Androni Giocattoli–Sidermec | 18h 38' 31" |
| 2 | Alejandro Osorio (COL) | Caja Rural–Seguros RGA | + 2' 00" |
| 3 | Florian Lipowitz (GER) | Tirol KTM Cycling Team | + 4' 03" |
| 4 | Erik Fetter (HUN) | Eolo–Kometa | + 8' 03" |
| 5 | Attila Valter (HUN) | Groupama–FDJ | + 9' 13" |
| 6 | Vadim Pronskiy (KAZ) | Astana–Premier Tech | + 9' 36" |
| 7 | Mattias Skjelmose Jensen (DEN) | Trek–Segafredo | + 14' 07" |
| 8 | Andrés Ardila (COL) | UAE Team Emirates | + 14' 07" |
| 9 | Michel Ries (LUX) | Trek–Segafredo | + 14' 30" |
| 10 | Georg Steinhauser (GER) | Tirol KTM Cycling Team | + 15' 03" |

=== Sprints classification ===
Final sprints classification (1–10)
| Rank | Rider | Team | Points |
|---|---|---|---|
| 1 | Felix Engelhardt (GER) | Tirol KTM Cycling Team | 12 |
| 2 | Alessandro De Marchi (ITA) | Israel Start-Up Nation | 8 |
| 3 | Gianni Moscon (ITA) | INEOS Grenadiers | 6 |
| 4 | Luis León Sánchez (ESP) | Astana–Premier Tech | 6 |
| 5 | Márton Dina (HUN) | Eolo–Kometa | 6 |
| 6 | Tony Gallopin (FRA) | AG2R Citroën Team | 4 |
| 7 | Attila Valter (HUN) | Groupama–FDJ | 4 |
| 8 | Nicolas Roche (IRL) | Team DSM | 4 |
| 9 | Davide Bais (ITA) | Eolo–Kometa | 4 |
| 10 | Matteo Fabbro (ITA) | Bora–Hansgrohe | 2 |

=== Team classification ===
Final team classification (1–10)
| Rank | Team | Time |
|---|---|---|
| 1 | INEOS Grenadiers | 56h 01' 17" |
| 2 | Team DSM | + 1' 49" |
| 3 | Astana–Premier Tech | + 7' 26" |
| 4 | AG2R Citroën Team | + 9' 18" |
| 5 | Team BikeExchange | + 9' 21" |
| 6 | EF Education–Nippo | + 11' 51" |
| 7 | Bora–Hansgrohe | + 14' 56" |
| 8 | Israel Start-Up Nation | + 15' 19" |
| 9 | Trek–Segafredo | + 15' 52" |
| 10 | Androni Giocattoli–Sidermec | + 16' 49" |
