= 2023 Tour of Austria =

Austrian cycling race

2023 UCI Europe Tour

Race details
- Dates: 2–6 July 2023
- Stages: 5
- Distance: 807.7 km (501.9 mi)
- Winning time: 18h 54' 50"

Results
Jersey awarded to the overall winner	Winner	Jhonatan Narváez (ECU)	(Ineos Grenadiers)
	Second	Jason Osborne (GER)	(Alpecin–Deceuninck)
	Third	Jesús David Peña (COL)	(Team Jayco–AlUla)
Jersey awarded to the points classification winner	Points	Jhonatan Narváez (ECU)	(Ineos Grenadiers)
Jersey awarded to the mountains classification winner	Mountains	Patryk Stosz (POL)	(Voster ATS Team)
Jersey awarded to the youth classification winner	Youth	Jesús David Peña (COL)	(Team Jayco–AlUla)
	Team	Team Jayco–AlUla	

The 2023 Tour of Austria (German: Österreich-Rundfahrt 2023) is a road cycling stage race that took place between 2 and 6 July 2023 in Austria. The race was rated as a category 2.1 event on the 2023 UCI Europe Tour calendar, and was the 72nd edition of the Tour of Austria.

== Teams ==
Four of the 18 UCI WorldTeams, two UCI ProTeams and thirteen UCI Continental teams made up the 19 teams that participated in the race.

UCI WorldTeams

- Alpecin–Deceuninck
- Ineos Grenadiers
- Team Jayco–AlUla
- UAE Team Emirates

UCI ProTeams

- Bingoal WB
- Eolo–Kometa

UCI Continental Teams

- Team Felbermayr–Simplon Wels
- Hrinkow Advarics
- Team Vorarlberg
- Tirol KTM Cycling Team
- WSA KTM Graz p/b Leomo
- Adria Mobil
- P&S Benotti
- Elkov–Kasper
- Dukla Banská Bystrica
- Leopard TOGT Pro Cycling
- Team Lotto–Kern Haus
- Santic–Wibatech
- Voster ATS Team

== Route ==
Stage characteristics and winners
Stage	Date	Course	Distance	Type	Stage winner
1	2 July	Dornbirn to Dornbirn	147.6 km (91.7 mi)	Hilly stage	Pascal Ackermann (GER)
2	3 July	St Anton am Arlberg to Innsbruck	158.8 km (98.7 mi)	Hilly stage	Jhonatan Narváez (ECU)
3	4 July	Sillian to Alpendorf	148.5 km (92.3 mi)	Intermediate stage	Jhonatan Narváez (ECU)
4	5 July	Alpendorf to Steyr	197 km (122 mi)	Hilly stage	Matteo Sobrero (ITA)
5	6 July	Ybbs an der Donau to Sonntagberg	155.8 km (96.8 mi)	Intermediate stage	Jhonatan Narváez (ECU)
Total			807.7 km (501.9 mi)		

== Stages ==
=== Stage 1 ===
2 July 2023 – Dornbirn to Dornbirn, 147.6 km (91.7 mi)

Stage 1 Result
Rank	Rider	Team	Time
1	Pascal Ackermann (GER)	UAE Team Emirates	3h 23' 09"
2	Jhonatan Narváez (ECU)	Ineos Grenadiers	+ 0"
3	Kim Heiduk (GER)	Ineos Grenadiers	+ 0"
4	Gianni Vermeersch (BEL)	Alpecin–Deceuninck	+ 0"
5	Felix Engelhardt (GER)	Team Jayco–AlUla	+ 0"
6	Nick van der Lijke (NED)	Leopard TOGT Pro Cycling	+ 0"
7	Xandro Meurisse (BEL)	Alpecin–Deceuninck	+ 0"
8	Lukas Rüegg (SUI)	Team Vorarlberg	+ 0"
9	Tobias Bayer (AUT)	Alpecin–Deceuninck	+ 0"
10	Dominik Neuman (CZE)	Elkov–Kasper	+ 0"

General classification after Stage 1
Rank	Rider	Team	Time
1	Pascal Ackermann (GER)	UAE Team Emirates	3h 22' 59"
2	Jhonatan Narváez (ECU)	Ineos Grenadiers	+ 4"
3	Kim Heiduk (GER)	Ineos Grenadiers	+ 6"
4	Gianni Vermeersch (BEL)	Alpecin–Deceuninck	+ 10"
5	Felix Engelhardt (GER)	Team Jayco–AlUla	+ 10"
6	Nick van der Lijke (NED)	Leopard TOGT Pro Cycling	+ 10"
7	Xandro Meurisse (BEL)	Alpecin–Deceuninck	+ 10"
8	Lukas Rüegg (SUI)	Team Vorarlberg	+ 10"
9	Tobias Bayer (AUT)	Alpecin–Deceuninck	+ 10"
10	Dominik Neuman (CZE)	Elkov–Kasper	+ 10"

=== Stage 2 ===
3 July 2023 – St Anton am Arlberg to Innsbruck, 158.8 km (98.7 mi)

Stage 2 Result
Rank	Rider	Team	Time
1	Jhonatan Narváez (ECU)	Ineos Grenadiers	3h 28' 41"
2	Gianni Vermeersch (BEL)	Alpecin–Deceuninck	+ 0"
3	Javier Serrano (ESP)	Eolo–Kometa	+ 0"
4	Marco Tizza (ITA)	Bingoal WB	+ 0"
5	Felix Engelhardt (GER)	Team Jayco–AlUla	+ 0"
6	Dominik Neuman (CZE)	Elkov–Kasper	+ 0"
7	Louis Blouwe (BEL)	Bingoal WB	+ 0"
8	Mario Gamper (AUT)	Santic–Wibatech	+ 0"
9	Johan Meens (BEL)	Bingoal WB	+ 0"
10	Lukas Rüegg (SUI)	Team Vorarlberg	+ 0"

General classification after Stage 2
Rank	Rider	Team	Time
1	Jhonatan Narváez (ECU)	Ineos Grenadiers	6h 51' 31"
2	Pascal Ackermann (GER)	UAE Team Emirates	+ 9"
3	Gianni Vermeersch (BEL)	Alpecin–Deceuninck	+ 13"
4	Javier Serrano (ESP)	Eolo–Kometa	+ 15"
5	Kim Heiduk (GER)	Ineos Grenadiers	+ 15"
6	Matteo Sobrero (ITA)	Team Jayco–AlUla	+ 17"
7	Emanuel Zangerle (AUT)	Team Felbermayr–Simplon Wels	+ 18"
8	Felix Engelhardt (GER)	Team Jayco–AlUla	+ 19"
9	Dominik Neuman (CZE)	Elkov–Kasper	+ 19"
10	Lukas Rüegg (SUI)	Team Vorarlberg	+ 19"

=== Stage 3 ===
4 July 2023 – Sillian to Alpendorf, 148.5 km (92.3 mi)

Stage 3 Result
Rank	Rider	Team	Time
1	Jhonatan Narváez (ECU)	Ineos Grenadiers	3h 54' 26"
2	Welay Berhe (ETH)	Team Jayco–AlUla	+ 0"
3	Jesús David Peña (COL)	Team Jayco–AlUla	+ 3"
4	Jason Osborne (GER)	Alpecin–Deceuninck	+ 3"
5	George Bennett (NZL)	UAE Team Emirates	+ 3"
6	Pavel Sivakov (FRA)	Ineos Grenadiers	+ 6"
7	Alessandro Covi (ITA)	UAE Team Emirates	+ 6"
8	Felix Engelhardt (GER)	Team Jayco–AlUla	+ 6"
9	Martin Messner (AUT)	WSA KTM Graz p/b Leomo	+ 10"
10	Riccardo Zoidl (AUT)	Team Felbermayr–Simplon Wels	+ 10"

General classification after Stage 3
Rank	Rider	Team	Time
1	Jhonatan Narváez (ECU)	Ineos Grenadiers	10h 45' 47"
2	Jesús David Peña (COL)	Team Jayco–AlUla	+ 28"
3	George Bennett (NZL)	UAE Team Emirates	+ 32"
4	Jason Osborne (GER)	Alpecin–Deceuninck	+ 32"
5	Felix Engelhardt (GER)	Team Jayco–AlUla	+ 35"
6	Matteo Sobrero (ITA)	Team Jayco–AlUla	+ 35"
7	Alessandro Covi (ITA)	UAE Team Emirates	+ 35"
8	Pavel Sivakov (FRA)	Ineos Grenadiers	+ 35"
9	Davide Formolo (ITA)	UAE Team Emirates	+ 39"
10	Colin Stüssi (SUI)	Team Vorarlberg	+ 39"

=== Stage 4 ===
5 July 2023 – Alpendorf to Steyr, 197 km (122 mi)

Stage 4 Result
Rank	Rider	Team	Time
1	Matteo Sobrero (ITA)	Team Jayco–AlUla	4h 09' 19"
2	Felix Engelhardt (GER)	Team Jayco–AlUla	+ 0"
3	Michael Boroš (CZE)	Elkov–Kasper	+ 0"
4	Lennert Teugels (BEL)	Bingoal WB	+ 0"
5	Mathias Bregnhøj (DEN)	Leopard TOGT Pro Cycling	+ 0"
6	Davide Formolo (ITA)	UAE Team Emirates	+ 0"
7	Alessandro Covi (ITA)	UAE Team Emirates	+ 0"
8	Jhonatan Narváez (ECU)	Ineos Grenadiers	+ 0"
9	Simone Raccani (ITA)	Eolo–Kometa	+ 0"
10	Colin Stüssi (SUI)	Team Vorarlberg	+ 0"

General classification after Stage 4
Rank	Rider	Team	Time
1	Jhonatan Narváez (ECU)	Ineos Grenadiers	14h 55' 03"
2	Matteo Sobrero (ITA)	Team Jayco–AlUla	+ 28"
3	Jesús David Peña (COL)	Team Jayco–AlUla	+ 31"
4	Felix Engelhardt (GER)	Team Jayco–AlUla	+ 32"
5	George Bennett (NZL)	UAE Team Emirates	+ 33"
6	Jason Osborne (GER)	Alpecin–Deceuninck	+ 35"
7	Alessandro Covi (ITA)	UAE Team Emirates	+ 38"
8	Pavel Sivakov (FRA)	Ineos Grenadiers	+ 38"
9	Davide Formolo (ITA)	UAE Team Emirates	+ 42"
10	Colin Stüssi (SUI)	Team Vorarlberg	+ 42"

=== Stage 5 ===
6 July 2023 – Ybbs an der Donau to Sonntagberg, 155.8 km (96.8 mi)

Stage 5 Result
Rank	Rider	Team	Time
1	Jhonatan Narváez (ECU)	Ineos Grenadiers	3h 59' 57"
2	Welay Berhe (ETH)	Team Jayco–AlUla	+ 0"
3	Jason Osborne (GER)	Alpecin–Deceuninck	+ 0"
4	Jesús David Peña (COL)	Team Jayco–AlUla	+ 4"
5	Matteo Sobrero (ITA)	Team Jayco–AlUla	+ 22"
6	Pavel Sivakov (FRA)	Ineos Grenadiers	+ 22"
7	Luca Vergallito (ITA)	Alpecin–Deceuninck	+ 24"
8	Davide Formolo (ITA)	UAE Team Emirates	+ 34"
9	Floris De Tier (BEL)	Bingoal WB	+ 34"
10	George Bennett (NZL)	UAE Team Emirates	+ 34"

General classification after Stage 5
Rank	Rider	Team	Time
1	Jhonatan Narváez (ECU)	Ineos Grenadiers	18h 54' 50"
2	Jason Osborne (GER)	Alpecin–Deceuninck	+ 41"
3	Jesús David Peña (COL)	Team Jayco–AlUla	+ 45"
4	Matteo Sobrero (ITA)	Team Jayco–AlUla	+ 1' 00"
5	Pavel Sivakov (FRA)	Ineos Grenadiers	+ 1' 10"
6	Welay Berhe (ETH)	Team Jayco–AlUla	+ 1' 12"
7	George Bennett (NZL)	UAE Team Emirates	+ 1' 17"
8	Luca Vergallito (ITA)	Alpecin–Deceuninck	+ 1' 21"
9	Davide Formolo (ITA)	UAE Team Emirates	+ 1' 26"
10	Floris De Tier (BEL)	Bingoal WB	+ 1' 26"

== Classification leadership table ==
Classification leadership by stage
Stage	Winner	General classification	Points classification	Mountains classification	Young rider classification	Team classification
1	Pascal Ackermann	Pascal Ackermann	Pascal Ackermann	Stinus Kaempe	Kim Heiduk	Alpecin–Deceuninck
2	Jhonatan Narváez	Jhonatan Narváez	Jhonatan Narváez	Stinus Kaempe	Javier Serrano	Alpecin–Deceuninck
3	Jhonatan Narváez	Jhonatan Narváez	Jhonatan Narváez	Jonas Rapp	Jesús David Peña	Team Jayco–AlUla
4	Matteo Sobrero	Jhonatan Narváez	Jhonatan Narváez	Patryk Stosz	Jesús David Peña	Team Jayco–AlUla
5	Jhonatan Narváez	Jhonatan Narváez	Jhonatan Narváez	Patryk Stosz	Jesús David Peña	Team Jayco–AlUla
Final		Jhonatan Narváez	Jhonatan Narváez	Patryk Stosz	Jesús David Peña	Team Jayco–AlUla

== Classification standings ==
Legend
Denotes the leader of the general classification	Denotes the leader of the mountains classification
Denotes the leader of the points classification	Denotes the leader of the young rider classification

=== General classification ===
Final general classification (1–10)
Rank	Rider	Team	Time
1	Jhonatan Narváez (ECU)	Ineos Grenadiers	18h 54' 50"
2	Jason Osborne (GER)	Alpecin–Deceuninck	+ 41"
3	Jesús David Peña (COL)	Team Jayco–AlUla	+ 45"
4	Matteo Sobrero (ITA)	Team Jayco–AlUla	+ 1' 00"
5	Pavel Sivakov (FRA)	Ineos Grenadiers	+ 1' 10"
6	Welay Berhe (ETH)	Team Jayco–AlUla	+ 1' 12"
7	George Bennett (NZL)	UAE Team Emirates	+ 1' 17"
8	Luca Vergallito (ITA)	Alpecin–Deceuninck	+ 1' 21"
9	Davide Formolo (ITA)	UAE Team Emirates	+ 1' 26"
10	Floris De Tier (BEL)	Bingoal WB	+ 1' 26"

=== Points classification ===
Final points classification (1–10)
Rank	Rider	Team	Time
1	Jhonatan Narváez (ECU)	Ineos Grenadiers	69
2	Felix Engelhardt (GER)	Team Jayco–AlUla	30
3	Matteo Sobrero (ITA)	Team Jayco–AlUla	26
4	Welay Berhe (ETH)	Team Jayco–AlUla	24
5	Jason Osborne (GER)	Alpecin–Deceuninck	18
6	Jesús David Peña (COL)	Team Jayco–AlUla	18
7	Felix Ritzinger (AUT)	Team Felbermayr–Simplon Wels	14
8	Žiga Horvat (SLO)	Hrinkow Advarics	14
9	Adam Ťoupalík (CZE)	Elkov–Kasper	12
10	Pavel Sivakov (FRA)	Ineos Grenadiers	12

=== Mountains classification ===
Final mountains classification (1–10)
Rank	Rider	Team	Time
1	Patryk Stosz (POL)	Voster ATS Team	21
2	Jonas Rapp (GER)	Hrinkow Advarics	20
3	Maximilian Kabas (AUT)	WSA KTM Graz p/b Leomo	16
4	Lukas Pöstlberger (AUT)	Team Jayco–AlUla	13
5	Stinus Kaempe (AUT)	WSA KTM Graz p/b Leomo	11
6	Adam Ťoupalík (CZE)	Elkov–Kasper	11
7	Žiga Horvat (SLO)	Hrinkow Advarics	11
8	Pavel Sivakov (FRA)	Ineos Grenadiers	9
9	Nick van der Lijke (NED)	Leopard TOGT Pro Cycling	9
10	Samuele Rivi (ITA)	Eolo–Kometa	9

=== Young rider classification ===
Final young rider classification (1–10)
Rank	Rider	Team	Time
1	Jesús David Peña (COL)	Team Jayco–AlUla	18h 55' 35"
2	Welay Berhe (ETH)	Team Jayco–AlUla	+ 27"
3	Felix Engelhardt (GER)	Team Jayco–AlUla	+ 59"
4	Rudy Porter (AUS)	Team Jayco–AlUla	+ 1' 06"
5	Martin Messner (AUT)	WSA KTM Graz p/b Leomo	+ 1' 11"
6	Simone Raccani (ITA)	Eolo–Kometa	+ 1' 36"
7	Jannis Peter (GER)	P&S Benotti	+ 3' 38"
8	Filip Řeha (CZE)	Elkov–Kasper	+ 12' 55"
9	Axel Laurance (FRA)	Alpecin–Deceuninck	+ 13' 40"
10	Kim Heiduk (GER)	Ineos Grenadiers	+ 15' 38"

=== Team classification ===
Final team classification (1–10)
Rank	Team	Time
1	Team Jayco–AlUla	56h 47' 11"
2	Alpecin–Deceuninck	+ 1' 56"
3	Ineos Grenadiers	+ 4' 29"
4	UAE Team Emirates	+ 5' 59"
5	Bingoal WB	+ 11' 30"
6	Leopard TOGT Pro Cycling	+ 19' 38"
7	Hrinkow Advarics	+ 22' 22"
8	Team Felbermayr–Simplon Wels	+ 25' 17"
9	Elkov–Kasper	+ 25' 34"
10	Eolo–Kometa	+ 33' 31"
