= 2023 Vuelta a Castilla y León =

Spanish cycling race

2023 UCI Europe Tour

Race details
- Dates: 26–27 May 2023
- Stages: 2
- Distance: 355.1 km (220.6 mi)
- Winning time: 8h 26' 48"

Results
Jersey awarded to the overall winner	Winner	Eduardo Sepúlveda (ARG)	(Lotto–Dstny)
	Second	Felix Engelhardt (GER)	(Team Jayco–AlUla)
	Third	Alex Molenaar (NED)	(Electro Hiper Europa)
Jersey awarded to the points classification winner	Points	Felix Engelhardt (GER)	(Team Jayco–AlUla)
Jersey awarded to the mountains classification winner	Mountains	Jetse Bol (NED)	(Burgos BH)
	Team	EF Education–EasyPost	

The 2023 Vuelta a Castilla y León (English: 2023 Tour of Castile and León) is a road cycling stage race that took place between 26 and 27 July 2023 in the Spanish autonomous community of Castile and León. The race was rated as a category 2.1 event on the 2023 UCI Europe Tour calendar, and is the 37th edition of the Vuelta a Castilla y León.

== Teams ==
6 of the 18 UCI WorldTeams, ten UCI ProTeams and three UCI Continental teams made up the 19 teams that participated in the race.

UCI WorldTeams

- Arkéa–Samsic
- Astana Qazaqstan Team
- EF Education–EasyPost
- Team Jayco–AlUla
- Movistar Team
- UAE Team Emirates

UCI ProTeams

- Burgos BH
- Caja Rural–Seguros RGA
- Eolo–Kometa
- Equipo Kern Pharma
- Euskaltel–Euskadi
- Human Powered Health
- Israel–Premier Tech
- Lotto–Dstny
- Q36.5 Pro Cycling Team
- Team TotalEnergies

UCI Continental Teams

- Electro Hiper Europa
- Tavfer–Ovos Matinados–Mortágua
- NSJBI Victoria Sports

== Route ==
Stage characteristics and winners
Stage	Date	Course	Distance	Type	Stage winner
1	26 July	Soria to Soria	168.9 km (104.9 mi)	Hilly stage	Felix Engelhardt (GER)
2	27 July	Coca to Segovia	186.2 km (115.7 mi)	Hilly stage	Eduardo Sepúlveda (ARG)
Total			355.1 km (220.6 mi)		

== Stages ==
=== Stage 1 ===
26 July 2023 – Soria to Soria, 168.9 km (104.9 mi)

Stage 1 result
Rank	Rider	Team	Time
1	Felix Engelhardt (GER)	Team Jayco–AlUla	4h 01' 09"
2	Alessandro Fedeli (ITA)	Q36.5 Pro Cycling Team	+ 0"
3	Alex Molenaar (NED)	Electro Hiper Europa	+ 0"
4	Iván García Cortina (ESP)	Movistar Team	+ 0"
5	Simone Velasco (ITA)	Astana Qazaqstan Team	+ 8"
6	Eduardo Sepúlveda (ARG)	Lotto–Dstny	+ 8"
7	Welay Berhe (ETH)	Team Jayco–AlUla	+ 8"
8	Alessandro Covi (ITA)	UAE Team Emirates	+ 8"
9	Cristián Rodríguez (ESP)	Arkéa–Samsic	+ 8"
10	Jakob Fuglsang (DEN)	Israel–Premier Tech	+ 8"

General classification after Stage 1
Rank	Rider	Team	Time
1	Felix Engelhardt (GER)	Team Jayco–AlUla	4h 00' 59"
2	Alessandro Fedeli (ITA)	Q36.5 Pro Cycling Team	+ 4"
3	Alex Molenaar (NED)	Electro Hiper Europa	+ 6"
4	Iván García Cortina (ESP)	Movistar Team	+ 10"
5	Simone Velasco (ITA)	Astana Qazaqstan Team	+ 18"
6	Eduardo Sepúlveda (ARG)	Lotto–Dstny	+ 18"
7	Welay Berhe (ETH)	Team Jayco–AlUla	+ 18"
8	Alessandro Covi (ITA)	UAE Team Emirates	+ 18"
9	Cristián Rodríguez (ESP)	Arkéa–Samsic	+ 18"
10	Jakob Fuglsang (DEN)	Israel–Premier Tech	+ 18"

=== Stage 2 ===
27 July 2023 – Coca to Segovia, 182.6 km (113.5 mi)

Stage 2 result
Rank	Rider	Team	Time
1	Eduardo Sepúlveda (ARG)	Lotto–Dstny	4h 25' 41"
2	Pablo Castrillo (ESP)	Equipo Kern Pharma	+ 0"
3	Felix Engelhardt (GER)	Team Jayco–AlUla	+ 26"
4	Simone Velasco (ITA)	Astana Qazaqstan Team	+ 26"
5	Ryan Gibbons (RSA)	UAE Team Emirates	+ 26"
6	Jérémy Cabot (FRA)	Team TotalEnergies	+ 26"
7	Nickolas Zukowsky (CAN)	Q36.5 Pro Cycling Team	+ 26"
8	Filippo Conca (ITA)	Q36.5 Pro Cycling Team	+ 26"
9	Raúl García Pierna (ESP)	Equipo Kern Pharma	+ 26"
10	Alejandro Franco (ESP)	Burgos BH	+ 26"

General classification after Stage 2
Rank	Rider	Team	Time
1	Eduardo Sepúlveda (ARG)	Lotto–Dstny	8h 26' 48"
2	Felix Engelhardt (GER)	Team Jayco–AlUla	+ 14"
3	Alex Molenaar (NED)	Electro Hiper Europa	+ 24"
4	Harry Sweeny (AUS)	Lotto–Dstny	+ 35"
5	Simone Velasco (ITA)	Astana Qazaqstan Team	+ 36"
6	Raúl García Pierna (ESP)	Equipo Kern Pharma	+ 36"
7	Georg Steinhauser (GER)	EF Education–EasyPost	+ 36"
8	Jakob Fuglsang (DEN)	Israel–Premier Tech	+ 36"
9	Welay Berhe (ETH)	Team Jayco–AlUla	+ 36"
10	Nickolas Zukowsky (CAN)	Q36.5 Pro Cycling Team	+ 36"

== Classification leadership table ==
Classification leadership by stage
Stage	Winner	General classification	Points classification	Mountains classification	Team classification
1	Felix Engelhardt	Felix Engelhardt	August Jensen	Jetse Bol	Team Jayco–AlUla
2	Eduardo Sepúlveda	Eduardo Sepúlveda	Felix Engelhardt	Jetse Bol	EF Education–EasyPost
Final		Eduardo Sepúlveda	Felix Engelhardt	Jetse Bol	EF Education–EasyPost
