= Nick Schultz (cyclist) =

Australian cyclist

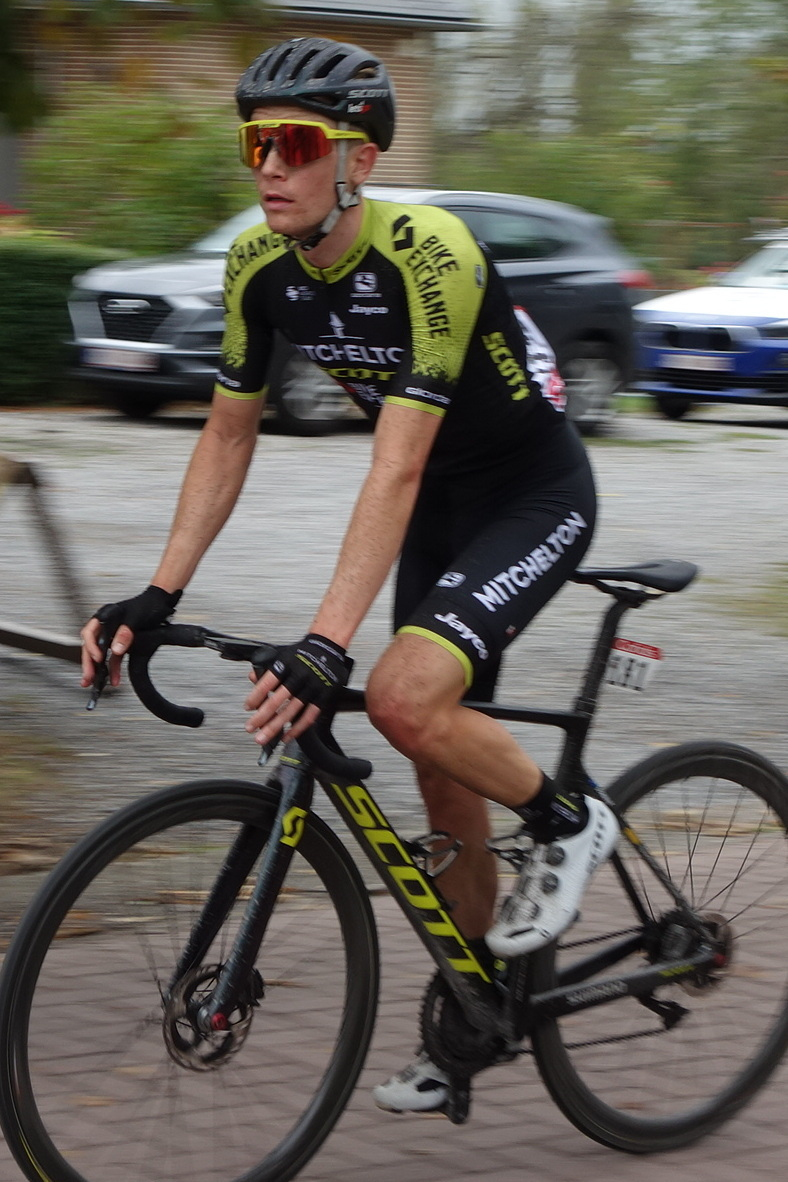
- Schultz in 2020

Personal information
- Full name: Nicholas Schultz
- Born: 13 September 1994 (age 32) Brisbane, Queensland, Australia
- Height: 1.8 m (5 ft 11 in)
- Weight: 68 kg (150 lb)

Cycling career
- Sport: Cycling
- Current team: NSN Cycling Team
- Discipline: Road
- Role: Rider
- Rider type: Climber

Amateur teams
- 2013–2015: CR4C Roanne
- 2014: Etixx (stagiaire)
- 2016: Orica–BikeExchange (stagiaire)

Professional teams
- 2016: SEG Racing Academy
- 2017–2018: Caja Rural–Seguros RGA
- 2019–2022: Mitchelton–Scott
- 2023–: Israel–Premier Tech

Nicholas Schultz (born 13 September 1994) is an Australian professional road racing cyclist, who currently rides for UCI ProTeam NSN Cycling Team.

== Major results ==
2011
1st Time trial, Oceania Junior Road Championships
2nd Trofeo Emilio Paganessi
7th Trofeo comune di Vertova Memorial Pietro Merelli
2012
3rd Road race, National Junior Road Championships
2015
5th Road race, National Under-23 Road Championships
7th Overall Tour de Gironde
2016
1st Stage 7 Tour de l'Avenir
2nd Overall Oberösterreich Rundfahrt

1st Young rider classification

7th Overall Ronde de l'Isard
10th Overall Tour de Bretagne

1st Stage 7

10th Overall Ronde de l'Oise
2017
6th Klasika Primavera
7th Overall Tour of Norway
2018
3rd GP Miguel Induráin
7th Klasika Primavera
2019 (1 pro win)
2nd Overall Herald Sun Tour

1st Stage 4

3rd Overall Settimana Internazionale di Coppi e Bartali

1st Stage 1b (TTT)

2021 (1)
3rd Overall Settimana Internazionale di Coppi e Bartali
4th Overall Czech Cycling Tour

1st Stage 2

10th Overall Tour of the Alps
2022
2nd Stage 10 2022 Tour de France
2023
10th Gran Piemonte
2024 (1)
1st Stage 1 Volta a Catalunya
9th Milano–Torino

=== Grand Tour general classification results timeline ===
| Grand Tour | 2017 | 2018 | 2019 | 2020 | 2021 | 2022 | 2023 | 2024 | 2025 |
|---|---|---|---|---|---|---|---|---|---|
| Giro d'Italia | — | — | — | — | DNF | — | — | DNF | 106 |
| Tour de France | — | — | — | — | — | 23 | 39 | — | — |
| Vuelta a España | 111 | 75 | 63 | 25 | 49 | — | — | — | — |

Legend
| — | Did not compete |
| DNF | Did not finish |
