= Matteo Sobrero =

Italian cyclist (born 1997)

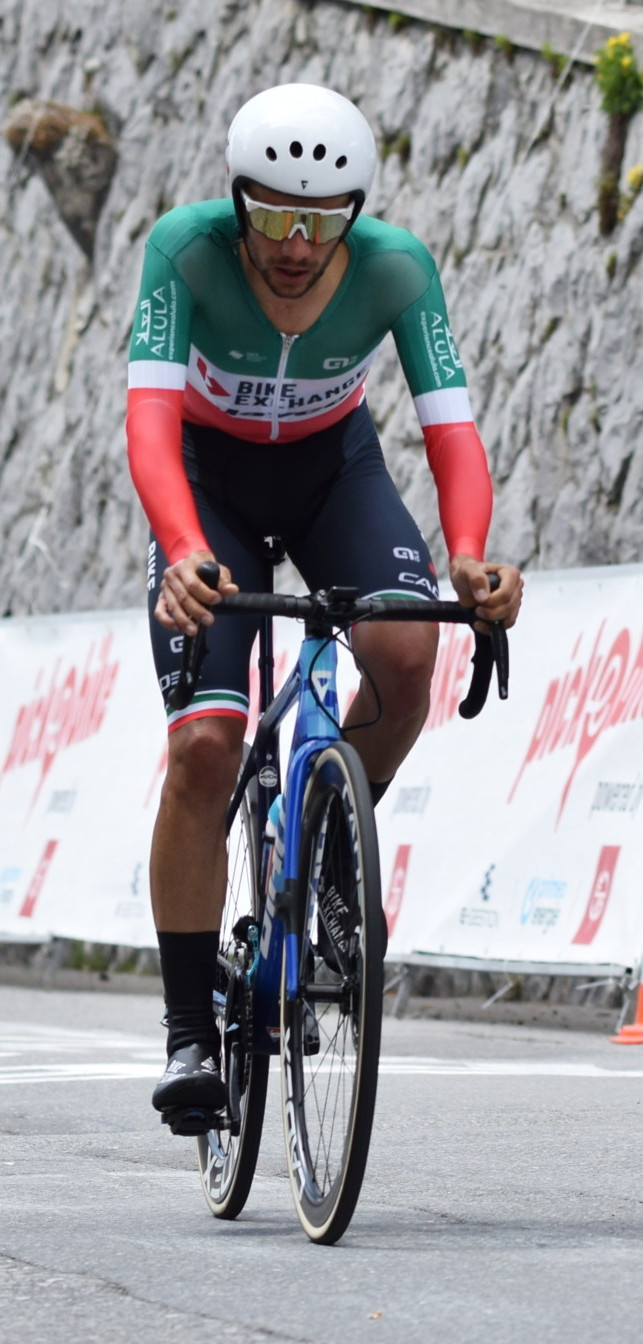
- Sobrero at 2022 Tour de Romandie

Personal information
- Full name: Matteo Sobrero
- Born: 14 May 1997 (age 29) Alba, Italy
- Height: 1.77 m (5 ft 10 in)
- Weight: 63 kg (139 lb)

Cycling career
- Sport: Cycling
- Current team: Lidl–Trek
- Discipline: Road
- Role: Rider
- Rider type: Time trialist

Amateur teams
- 2016: Viris Maserati–Sisal–Matchpoint
- 2017: Team Colpack

Professional teams
- 2018–2019: Dimension Data for Qhubeka
- 2018: Team Dimension Data (stagiaire)
- 2020: NTT Pro Cycling
- 2021: Astana–Premier Tech
- 2022–2023: Team BikeExchange–Jayco
- 2024–2025: Bora–Hansgrohe
- 2026-: Lidl–Trek

Major wins
- Grand Tours Giro d'Italia 1 individual stage (2022) One-day races and Classics National Time Trial Championships (2021)
Medal record
Men's road bicycle racing
Representing Italy
World Championships
Silver medal – second place	2022 Wollongong	Mixed team relay
Bronze medal – third place	2021 Flanders	Mixed team relay
European Championships
Gold medal – first place	2021 Trentino	Mixed team relay
Silver medal – second place	2023 Drenthe	Mixed team relay

Matteo Sobrero (born 14 May 1997) is an Italian cyclist, who currently rides for UCI WorldTeam Lidl–Trek. He was named in the startlist for the 2020 Giro d'Italia. Sobrero won a time trial stage at the 2022 Giro d’Italia.

== Major results ==
2015
2nd Trofeo Buffoni
3rd Trofeo Citta di Loano
2017
2nd Overall Vuelta al Bidasoa
4th Trofeo Città di San Vendemiano
2018
1st Coppa della Pace
2nd Time trial, National Under-23 Road Championships
2nd Gran Premio Industrie del Marmo
3rd Giro del Belvedere
5th G.P. Palio del Recioto
6th Trofeo Edil C
6th Trofeo Alcide Degasperi
9th Time trial, UCI Under-23 Road World Championships
2019
1st Time trial, National Under-23 Road Championships
1st G.P. Palio del Recioto
3rd Trofeo Laigueglia
3rd Giro del Belvedere
6th GP Capodarco
2020
5th Time trial, National Road Championships
2021 (1 pro win)
1st Team relay, UEC European Road Championships
1st Time trial, National Road Championships
3rd Team relay, UCI Road World Championships
3rd Overall Tour of Slovenia
2022 (1)
Giro d'Italia

1st Stage 21 (ITT)
Held after Stages 2–3

2nd Team relay, UCI Road World Championships
3rd Chrono des Nations
4th Overall Tour de Pologne
4th Time trial, National Road Championships
2023 (1)
2nd Team relay, UEC European Road Championships
3rd Time trial, National Road Championships
4th Overall Tour of Austria

1st Stage 4

Vuelta a España

Held after Stage 2

2024
4th Overall AlUla Tour
2025
3rd Overall Tour de Pologne
4th Time trial, National Road Championships
2026
1st Team relay, UCI Road World Championships
8th Overall Tour de Pologne
9th Overall Tour Down Under

=== Grand Tour general classification results timeline ===
Grand Tour	2020	2021	2022	2023	2024	2025
Giro d'Italia	76	61	70	—	—	—
Tour de France	—	—	—	—	60	—
Vuelta a España	—	—	—	86	—	122

Legend
—	Did not compete
DNF	Did not finish
