= Felix Engelhardt =

German cyclist (born 2000)

- Engelhardt in 2026

Personal information
- Born: 19 August 2000 (age 26) Ulm, Germany
- Height: 1.80 m (5 ft 11 in)
- Weight: 68 kg (150 lb)

Cycling career
- Sport: Cycling
- Current team: Team Jayco–AlUla
- Discipline: Road
- Role: Rider

Professional teams
- 2019–2022: Tirol KTM Cycling Team
- 2023–: Team Jayco–AlUla

Major wins
- One-day races and Classics National Road Race Championships (2026)
Medal record
Representing Germany
Men's road bicycle racing
European Championships
Gold medal – first place	2022 Anadia	Under-23 road race

Felix Engelhardt (born 19 August 2000) is a German professional racing cyclist, who currently rides for UCI WorldTeam Team Jayco–AlUla.

== Career ==
At the 2021 Tour of the Alps Engelhardt won the red Sprints jersey for winning the most intermediate sprint points he did this by attacking and being in the breakaway during multiple stages. In July 2022 during the 2022 European Road Championships Engelhardt rode the Under-23 Road race and attacked with 3 other riders on the final lap, they managed to stay away. Engelhardt contested the sprint and became the European champion. On 8 August 2022 it was announced that Engelhardt would join Team BikeExchange–Jayco on a two-year contract from 2023.

== Major results ==
2017
3rd Time trial, National Junior Road Championships
4th Overall Internationale Cottbuser Junioren-Etappenfahrt
2018
3rd Overall Oberösterreich Juniorenrundfahrt
5th Overall GP Général Patton
7th Grand Prix Bob Jungels
10th Overall Tour du Pays de Vaud
2021
1st Young rider classification, Oberösterreich Rundfahrt
1st Sprints classification, Tour of the Alps
2nd GP Kranj
10th Trofeo Matteotti
2022
1st Road race, UEC European Under-23 Road Championships
1st Stage 5 (TTT) Tour de l'Avenir
2nd GP Goriška & Vipava Valley
3rd Trofeo Città di Meldola
6th Overall Istrian Spring Trophy
6th Overall Giro Ciclistico d'Italia
10th Trofeo Banca Popolare di Vicenza
2023 (2 pro wins)
1st Per sempre Alfredo
2nd Overall Vuelta a Castilla y León

1st Points classification
1st Stage 1

2nd Japan Cup
4th Giro della Provincia di Reggio Calabria
8th Grand Prix of Aargau Canton
2024 (1)
3rd Overall Okolo Slovenska

1st Stages 1 (TTT) & 5

2025
2nd Road race, National Road Championships
4th Overall Tour of Austria
4th Overall Okolo Slovenska
4th GP Industria & Artigianato di Larciano
7th GP Gippingen
8th Overall Arctic Race of Norway
2026 (1)
1st Road race, National Road Championships
4th Overall Arctic Race of Norway
Combativity award Stage 2 Tour de France

=== Grand Tour general classification results timeline ===
Grand Tour	2023	2024	2025	2026
Giro d'Italia	—	—	82	DNF
Tour de France	—	—	—	
Vuelta a España	70	103	—	

Legend
—	Did not compete
DNF	Did not finish
