= 2023 Cadel Evans Great Ocean Road Race (women's race) =

2023 UCI Women's World Tour, race 2 of 27
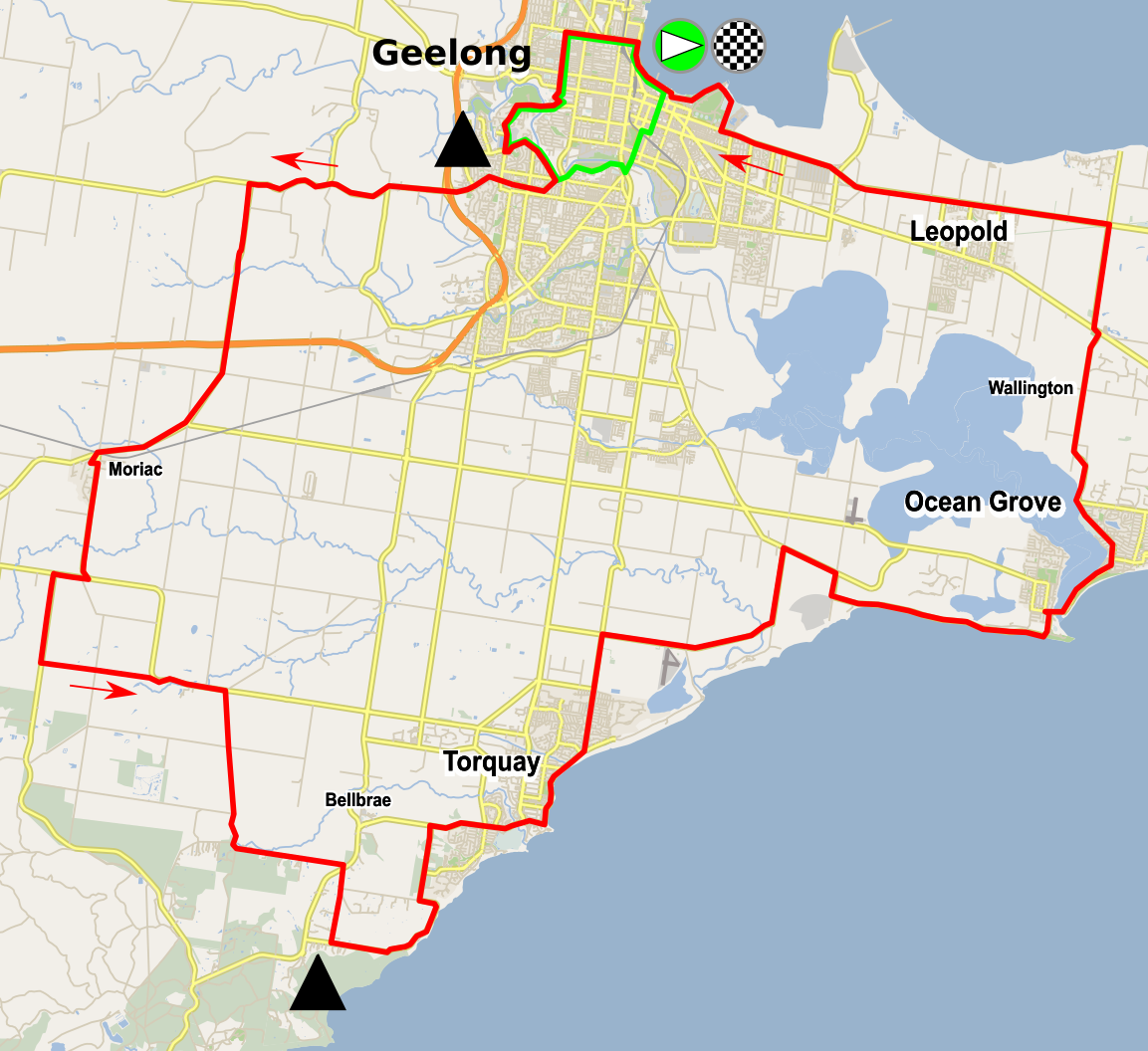
- Route map

Race details
- Dates: 28 January 2023
- Stages: 1
- Distance: 143 km (89 mi)
- Winning time: 3h 52' 47"

Results
	Winner	Loes Adegeest (NED)	(FDJ–Suez)
	Second	Amanda Spratt (AUS)	(Trek–Segafredo)
	Third	Nina Buijsman (NED)	(Human Powered Health)

The 2023 Cadel Evans Great Ocean Road Race - Elite Women was an Australian road cycling one-day race that took place on 28 January 2023.

It was the 7th edition of the Cadel Evans Great Ocean Road Race and the 2nd event of the 2023 UCI Women's World Tour. It was won by Dutch rider Loes Adegeest of FDJ Suez in a sprint finish.

== Teams ==
Twelve teams took part in the event, including six UCI Women's WorldTeams, and three teams from Australia.

UCI Women's WorldTeams

- EF Education–Tibco–SVB
- FDJ–Suez
- Israel Premier Tech Roland
- Team Jayco–AlUla
- Human Powered Health
- Trek–Segafredo

UCI Women's Continental Teams

- Team Coop–Hitec Products
- Zaaf Cycling Team
- ARA Skip Capital
- Team BridgeLane
- St. Michel–Mavic–Auber93

National Teams

- Australia

== Route ==
The race started and finished in Geelong, Victoria using a 143 kilometres (89 mi) course. Starting from Geelong, the course travelled through the Bellarine Peninsula and Surf Coast, before returning to Geelong for two loops of a circuit around the city. This circuit featured the 830m Challambra climb with an average gradient of 8.9%, as used in the 2010 UCI Road World Championships.

== Result ==
The race was won by Dutch rider Loes Adegeest of FDJ Suez in a sprint finish, beating Amanda Spratt of Trek–Segafredo. It was Adegeest's first win at the Women's World Tour, after she won the UCI Cycling Esports World Championship in 2022. Nina Buijsman of Human Powered Health won a sprint of the chasing pack, taking third place.

Amanda Spratt of Trek–Segafredo took the leaders jersey of the UCI Women's World Tour, owing to her second places at both this event and at the Women's Tour Down Under.

Final general classification
Rank	Rider	Team	Time
1	Loes Adegeest (NED)	FDJ–Suez	3h 52' 47"
2	Amanda Spratt (AUS)	Trek–Segafredo	+ 0"
3	Nina Buijsman (NED)	Human Powered Health	+ 4"
4	Josie Nelson (GBR)	Team Coop–Hitec Products	+ 4"
5	Danielle De Francesco (AUS)	Zaaf Cycling Team	+ 4"
6	Henrietta Christie (NZL)	Human Powered Health	+ 4"
7	Ruby Roseman-Gannon (AUS)	Team Jayco–AlUla	+ 4"
8	Georgia Williams (NZL)	EF Education–Tibco–SVB	+ 4"
9	Krista Doebel-Hickok (USA)	EF Education–Tibco–SVB	+ 4"
10	Simone Boilard (CAN)	St. Michel–Mavic–Auber93	+ 4"
