= 2023 Women's Tour Down Under =

2023 UCI Women's World Tour, race 1 of 27

Race details
- Dates: 15–17 January 2023
- Stages: 3
- Distance: 293.6 km (182.4 mi)
- Winning time: 8h 03' 29"

Results
Jersey awarded to the overall winner	Winner	Grace Brown (AUS)	(FDJ–Suez)
	Second	Amanda Spratt (AUS)	(Trek–Segafredo)
	Third	Georgia Williams (NZL)	(Team Jayco–AlUla)
Jersey awarded to the mountains classification winner	Mountains	Amanda Spratt (AUS)	(Trek–Segafredo)
Jersey awarded to the young rider classification winner	Young rider	Henrietta Christie (NZL)	(Human Powered Health)
Jersey awarded to the sprints classification winner	Sprints	Grace Brown (AUS)	(FDJ–Suez)
	Team	EF Education–Tibco–SVB	

The 2023 Santos Women's Tour Down Under was a women's cycle stage race held in and around Adelaide, South Australia from 15 to 17 January 2023.

It was the sixth edition of Women's Tour Down Under, after the 2021 and 2022 editions were cancelled due to the COVID-19 pandemic. The race was the first event of the 2023 UCI Women's World Tour, with it joining the World Tour calendar for the first time. It was won by Australian rider Grace Brown of FDJ-Suez.

== Teams ==
Six UCI Women's WorldTeams, five UCI Women's Continental Teams and two national teams made up the 13 teams participating in the race.

UCI Women's WorldTeams

- EF Education–Tibco–SVB
- FDJ–Suez
- Israel Premier Tech Roland
- Team Jayco–AlUla
- Human Powered Health
- Trek–Segafredo

UCI Women's Continental Teams

- Team Coop–Hitec Products
- Zaaf Cycling Team
- ARA Skip Capital
- Team BridgeLane
- St. Michel–Mavic–Auber93

National Teams

- Australia
- New Zealand

== Route ==
List of stages
Stage	Date	Course	Distance	Type	Winner	Team
1	15 January	Glenelg to Aldinga	110.4 km (68.6 mi)	Flat stage	Daria Pikulik (POL)	Human Powered Health
2	16 January	Birdwood to Campbelltown	90 km (56 mi)	Hilly stage	Alex Manly (AUS)	Team Jayco–AlUla
3	17 January	Adelaide to Campbelltown	93.2 km (57.9 mi)	Hilly stage	Grace Brown (AUS)	FDJ–Suez
Total			293.6 km (182.4 mi)			

== Stages ==
=== Stage 1 ===
15 January — Glenelg to Aldinga, 110.4 km (68.6 mi)

Stage 1 Result
Rank	Rider	Team	Time
1	Daria Pikulik (POL)	Human Powered Health	3h 03' 01"
2	Clara Copponi (FRA)	FDJ–Suez	+ 0"
3	Georgia Baker (AUS)	Team Jayco–AlUla	+ 0"
4	Maggie Coles-Lyster (CAN)	Zaaf Cycling Team	+ 0"
5	Amanda Spratt (AUS)	Trek–Segafredo	+ 0"
6	Ally Wollaston (NZL)	New Zealand	+ 0"
7	Kaia Schmid (USA)	Human Powered Health	+ 0"
8	Ilaria Sanguineti (ITA)	Trek–Segafredo	+ 0"
9	Lucinda Stewart (AUS)	ARA Skip Capital	+ 0"
10	Brodie Chapman (AUS)	Trek–Segafredo	+ 0"

General classification after Stage 1
Rank	Rider	Team	Time
1	Daria Pikulik (POL)	Human Powered Health	3h 02' 51"
2	Clara Copponi (FRA)	FDJ–Suez	+ 4"
3	Georgia Baker (AUS)	Team Jayco–AlUla	+ 6"
4	Grace Brown (AUS)	FDJ–Suez	+ 7"
5	Alexandra Manly (AUS)	Team Jayco–AlUla	+ 8"
6	Ruby Roseman-Gannon (AUS)	Team Jayco–AlUla	+ 9"
7	Maggie Coles-Lyster (CAN)	Zaaf Cycling Team	+ 10"
8	Amanda Spratt (AUS)	Trek–Segafredo	+ 10"
9	Ally Wollaston (NZL)	New Zealand	+ 10"
10	Kaia Schmid (USA)	Human Powered Health	+ 10"

=== Stage 2 ===
16 January — Birdwood to Campbelltown, 90 km (56 mi)

Stage 2 Result
Rank	Rider	Team	Time
1	Alexandra Manly (AUS)	Team Jayco–AlUla	2h 23' 33"
2	Georgia Williams (NZL)	EF Education–Tibco–SVB	+ 0"
3	Nina Buijsman (NED)	Human Powered Health	+ 0"
4	Danielle De Francesco (AUS)	Zaaf Cycling Team	+ 0"
5	Grace Brown (AUS)	FDJ–Suez	+ 0"
6	Nicole Frain (AUS)	Australia	+ 0"
7	Eugénie Duval (FRA)	FDJ–Suez	+ 0"
8	Abi Smith (GBR)	EF Education–Tibco–SVB	+ 0"
9	Nikola Nosková (CZE)	Zaaf Cycling Team	+ 0"
10	Amanda Spratt (AUS)	Trek–Segafredo	+ 0"

General classification after Stage 2
Rank	Rider	Team	Time
1	Alexandra Manly (AUS)	Team Jayco–AlUla	5h 26' 20"
2	Georgia Williams (NZL)	EF Education–Tibco–SVB	+ 8"
3	Grace Brown (AUS)	FDJ–Suez	+ 8"
4	Ruby Roseman-Gannon (AUS)	Team Jayco–AlUla	+ 13"
5	Amanda Spratt (AUS)	Trek–Segafredo	+ 14"
6	Nicole Frain (AUS)	Australia	+ 14"
7	Loes Adegeest (NED)	FDJ–Suez	+ 14"
8	Kristabel Doebel-Hickok (USA)	EF Education–Tibco–SVB	+ 14"
9	Nina Buijsman (NED)	Human Powered Health	+ 16"
10	Danielle De Francesco (AUS)	Zaaf Cycling Team	+ 20"

=== Stage 3 ===
17 January — Adelaide to Campbelltown, 93.2 km (57.9 mi)

Stage 3 Result
Rank	Rider	Team	Time
1	Grace Brown (AUS)	FDJ–Suez	2h 37' 11"
2	Amanda Spratt (AUS)	Trek–Segafredo	+ 0"
3	Georgia Williams (NZL)	EF Education–Tibco–SVB	+ 13"
4	Danielle De Francesco (AUS)	Zaaf Cycling Team	+ 13"
5	Ruby Roseman-Gannon (AUS)	Team Jayco–AlUla	+ 13"
6	Rachel Neylan (AUS)	Australia	+ 13"
7	Henrietta Christie (NZL)	Human Powered Health	+ 13"
8	Claire Steels (GBR)	Israel Premier Tech Roland	+ 13"
9	Kristabel Doebel-Hickok (USA)	EF Education–Tibco–SVB	+ 13"
10	Ella Wyllie (NZL)	New Zealand	+ 13"

General classification after Stage 3
Rank	Rider	Team	Time
1	Grace Brown (AUS)	FDJ–Suez	8h 03' 29"
2	Amanda Spratt (AUS)	Trek–Segafredo	+ 10"
3	Georgia Williams (NZL)	EF Education–Tibco–SVB	+ 19"
4	Ruby Roseman-Gannon (AUS)	Team Jayco–AlUla	+ 28"
5	Kristabel Doebel-Hickok (USA)	EF Education–Tibco–SVB	+ 29"
6	Danielle De Francesco (AUS)	Zaaf Cycling Team	+ 35"
7	Henrietta Christie (NZL)	Human Powered Health	+ 35"
8	Ella Wyllie (NZL)	New Zealand	+ 35"
9	Rachel Neylan (AUS)	Australia	+ 35"
10	Abi Smith (GBR)	EF Education–Tibco–SVB	+ 38"

== Classification leadership table ==
Stage	Winner	General classification	Mountains classification	Sprint classification	Young rider classification	Team classification
1	Daria Pikulik	Daria Pikulik	Gladys Verhulst	Daria Pikulik	Ally Wollaston	Trek–Segafredo
2	Alex Manly	Alex Manly	Amanda Spratt	Alex Manly	Henrietta Christie	Human Powered Health
3	Grace Brown	Grace Brown	Amanda Spratt	Grace Brown	Henrietta Christie	EF Education–Tibco–SVB
Final		Grace Brown	Amanda Spratt	Grace Brown	Henrietta Christie	EF Education–Tibco–SVB

== Classification standings ==
=== General classification ===
Final general classification (1–10)
Rank	Rider	Team	Time
1	Grace Brown (AUS)	FDJ–Suez	8h 03' 29"
2	Amanda Spratt (AUS)	Trek–Segafredo	+ 10"
3	Georgia Williams (NZL)	EF Education–Tibco–SVB	+ 19"
4	Ruby Roseman-Gannon (AUS)	Team Jayco–AlUla	+ 28"
5	Kristabel Doebel-Hickok (USA)	EF Education–Tibco–SVB	+ 29"
6	Danielle De Francesco (AUS)	Zaaf Cycling Team	+ 35"
7	Henrietta Christie (NZL)	Human Powered Health	+ 35"
8	Ella Wyllie (NZL)	New Zealand	+ 35"
9	Rachel Neylan (AUS)	Australia	+ 35"
10	Abi Smith (GBR)	EF Education–Tibco–SVB	+ 38"

=== Sprints classification ===
Final sprints classification (1–10)
Rank	Rider	Team	Points
1	Grace Brown (AUS)	FDJ–Suez	43
2	Amanda Spratt (AUS)	Trek–Segafredo	41
3	Georgia Williams (NZL)	EF Education–Tibco–SVB	41
4	Alexandra Manly (AUS)	Team Jayco–AlUla	35
5	Danielle De Francesco (AUS)	Zaaf Cycling Team	32
6	Daria Pikulik (POL)	Human Powered Health	31
7	Clara Copponi (FRA)	FDJ–Suez	25
8	Nina Buijsman (NED)	Human Powered Health	24
9	Georgia Baker (AUS)	Team Jayco–AlUla	22
10	Nicole Frain (AUS)	Australia	19

=== Mountains classification ===
Final mountains classification (1–10)
Rank	Rider	Team	Points
1	Amanda Spratt (AUS)	Trek–Segafredo	20
2	Grace Brown (AUS)	FDJ–Suez	12
3	Gladys Verhulst-Wild (FRA)	FDJ–Suez	10
4	Claire Steels (GBR)	Israel Premier Tech Roland	7
5	Georgia Williams (NZL)	EF Education–Tibco–SVB	4
6	Ella Wyllie (NZL)	New Zealand	4
7	Rachel Neylan (AUS)	Australia	3
8	Lauretta Hanson (AUS)	Trek–Segafredo	3
9	Henrietta Christie (NZL)	Human Powered Health	2
10	Ruby Roseman-Gannon (AUS)	Team Jayco–AlUla	1

=== Young rider classification ===
Final young rider classification (1–10)
Rank	Rider	Team	Time
1	Henrietta Christie (NZL)	Human Powered Health	8h 04' 04"
2	Ella Wyllie (NZL)	New Zealand	+ 0"
3	Abi Smith (GBR)	EF Education–Tibco–SVB	+ 3"
4	Kaia Schmid (USA)	Human Powered Health	+ 3' 22"
5	Ally Wollaston (NZL)	New Zealand	+ 3' 22"
6	Mia Hayden (AUS)	Team BridgeLane	+ 3' 24"
7	Josie Nelson (GBR)	Team Coop–Hitec Products	+ 5' 28"
8	Camille Fahy (FRA)	St. Michel–Mavic–Auber93	+ 7' 17"
9	Isabelle Carnes (AUS)	ARA Skip Capital	+ 7' 47"
10	Mari Hole Mohr (NOR)	Team Coop–Hitec Products	+ 9' 25"

=== Team classification ===
Final team classification (1–10)
Rank	Team	Time
1	(United States) EF Education–Tibco–SVB	24h 11' 57"
2	(France) FDJ–Suez	+ 1' 04"
3	(Australia) Team Jayco–AlUla	+ 2' 58"
4	(Spain) Zaaf Cycling Team	+ 3' 43"
5	(United States) Human Powered Health	+ 3' 53"
6	(United States) Trek–Segafredo	+ 10' 41"
7	New Zealand	+ 10' 48"
8	Australia	+ 11' 30"
9	(France) St. Michel–Mavic–Auber93	+ 12' 32"
10	(Australia) ARA Skip Capital	+ 13' 35"
