= 2023 UCI Cycling Esports World Championships =

Cycling world championships

- Venue: Zwift
- Date: 18 February 2023
- Events: 2

The 2023 UCI Cycling Esports World Championships was the third edition of the UCI Cycling Esports World Championships, the annual world championships for esport road bicycle racing. It was held on 18 February 2023 on the platform Zwift on a specially designed, Scotland inspired course.

Loes Adegeest defended her 2022 world title in the women's race by winning the final sprint of three riders. The men's race was won by Bjørn Andreassen. He jumped ahead at the very start of the last race and managed to keep a gap until the finish.

== Elimination format ==
The format of the 2023 championships was changed into a three-race elimination series. Qualifying races were held in November 2022 in order to select 100 riders for each race. The February championships were divided into three 25 minute races with short breaks in between them. The first part The Punch started with the whole 100 rider peloton. The first 30 riders competed in the second part The Climb and raced for the 10 places in the finale elimination criterium called The Podium. At every half of the course one rider was eliminated until 3 riders remained and sprinted for the medals at the finish line.

== Results ==
=== Men's Race ===
Rank	Rider	Country
Gold medal	Bjørn Andreassen	Denmark
Silver medal	Jason Osborne	Germany
Bronze medal	Marc Mäding	Germany
4	Anders Foldager	Denmark
5	Kjell Power	Belgium
6	Freddy Ovett	Australia
7	Haavard Gjeldnes	Norway
8	James Barnes	South Africa
9	Oskar Hvid	Denmark
10	Zach Nehr	United States

=== Women's race ===
Rank	Rider	Country
Gold medal	Loes Adegeest	Netherlands
Silver medal	Zoe Langham	Great Britain
Bronze medal	Jacqueline Godbe	United States
4	Sandrinne Etienne	France
5	Arielle Verhaaren	United States
6	Mika Söderström	Sweden
7	Kathrin Fuhrer	Switzerland
8	Liz Van Houweling	United States
9	Kristen Kulchinsky	United States
10	Lou Bates	Great Britain
