= Ovett =

Ovett is an English surname of unknown origin which is found mainly in Sussex.

Notable people with the surname include:

- Freddy Ovett (born 1994), British-born Australian cyclist
- Nick Ovett (born 1967), British luger
- Steve Ovett (born 1955), British runner

== See also ==
- Oviatt, a spelling variant
