= 2022 UCI Cycling Esports World Championships =

Cycling world championships

- Venue: Zwift, New York
- Date: 26 February 2022
- Events: 2

The 2022 UCI Cycling Esports World Championships was the second edition of the UCI Cycling Esports World Championships, the annual world championships for esport road bicycle racing. It was held on 26 February 2022 on the platform Zwift. Regional qualifiers took place 27–28 November 2021.

Along with professional riders, invited by their respective national cycling organisations to compete in the championships, Zwift held a number of qualification events. The first round Continental Open event series was open to all eligible riders in the Zwift community. The second round of Continental Qualifiers then determined those community riders that won a place in the UCI Cycling Esports World Championships in February 2022.

The men's race was won by 2020 Zwift Academy winner Jay Vine, while the women's race was won by Loes Adegeest.

== Qualifiers ==
Date	Platform	Location	Event	Distance
13 November 2021	Zwift	Watopia	Continental Open event series	28 km (17 mi)
14 November 2021	Zwift	London	Continental Open event series	30 km (19 mi)
20 November 2021	Zwift	Watopia	Continental Open event series	28 km (17 mi)
21 November 2021	Zwift	London	Continental Open event series	30 km (19 mi)
27 November 2021	Zwift		Women's Oceania Qualifiers to UCI 2022 Cycling Esports World Championships	
27 November 2021	Zwift		Women's Asian Qualifiers to UCI 2022 Cycling Esports World Championships	
27 November 2021	Zwift		Women's European Qualifiers to UCI 2022 Cycling Esports World Championships	
27 November 2021	Zwift		Women's African Qualifiers to UCI 2022 Cycling Esports World Championships	
27 November 2021	Zwift		Women's Pan American Qualifiers to UCI 2022 Cycling Esports World Championships	
28 November 2021	Zwift		Men's Oceania Qualifiers to UCI 2022 Cycling Esports World Championships	
28 November 2021	Zwift		Men's Asian Qualifiers to UCI 2022 Cycling Esports World Championships	
28 November 2021	Zwift		Men's European Qualifiers to UCI 2022 Cycling Esports World Championships	
28 November 2021	Zwift		Men's African Qualifiers to UCI 2022 Cycling Esports World Championships	
28 November 2021	Zwift		Men's Pan American Qualifiers to UCI 2022 Cycling Esports World Championships	

== Schedule ==
Date	Platform	Location	Event	Distance
26 February 2022	Zwift	New York	Men's road race	54.9 km (34.1 mi)
26 February 2022	Zwift	New York	Women's road race	54.9 km (34.1 mi)

== Results ==
=== Men's race ===
Result (1–10)
Rank	Rider	Team	Time
Gold medal	Jay Vine (AUS)	Australia	1h 15' 41"
Silver medal	Freddy Ovett (AUS)	Australia	+ 0.85"
Bronze medal	Jason Osborne (GER)	Germany	+ 1.45"
4	Ben Hill (AUS)	Australia	+ 1.95"
5	Lionel Vujasin (BEL)	Belgium	+ 1.95"
6	Oskar Hvid (DEN)	Denmark	+ 2.15"
7	Rainer Kepplinger (AUT)	Austria	+ 3.83"
8	Thomas Thrall (CAN)	Canada	+ 4.29"
9	Niki Hug (SUI)	Switzerland	+ 7.71"
10	Håvard Gjeldnes (NOR)	Norway	+ 8.00"

=== Women's race ===
Result (1–10)
Rank	Rider	Team	Time
Gold medal	Loes Adegeest (NED)	Netherlands	1h 23' 19"
Silver medal	Cecilia Hansen (SWE)	Sweden	+ 1.40"
Bronze medal	Zoe Langham (GBR)	Great Britain	+ 1.48"
4	Ashleigh Moolman Pasio (RSA)	South Africa	+ 10.21"
5	Liz Van Houweling (USA)	United States	+ 13.94"
6	Mary Wilkinson (GBR)	Great Britain	+ 16.26"
7	Emma Belforth (SWE)	Sweden	+ 16.27"
8	Courtney Nelson (USA)	United States	+ 16.61"
9	Jacquie Godbe (USA)	United States	+ 17.13"
10	Caroline Bohé (DEN)	Denmark	+ 17.30"
