= 2022 Danmark Rundt =

2022 UCI Europe Tour 2022 UCI ProSeries

Race details
- Dates: 16–20 August 2022
- Stages: 5
- Distance: 767.3 km (476.8 mi)
- Winning time: 17h 01' 20"

Results
Jersey awarded to the overall winner	Winner	Christophe Laporte (FRA)	(Team Jumbo–Visma)
	Second	Magnus Sheffield (USA)	(Ineos Grenadiers)
	Third	Mattias Skjelmose Jensen (DEN)	(Trek–Segafredo)
Jersey awarded to the points classification winner	Points	Christophe Laporte (FRA)	(Team Jumbo–Visma)
Jersey awarded to the mountains classification winner	Mountains	Rasmus Bøgh Wallin (DEN)	(Restaurant Suri–Carl Ras)
Jersey awarded to the youth classification winner	Youth	Magnus Sheffield (USA)	(Ineos Grenadiers)
Jersey awarded to the combativity classification winner	Combativity	Rasmus Bøgh Wallin (DEN)	(Restaurant Suri–Carl Ras)
	Team	Trek–Segafredo	

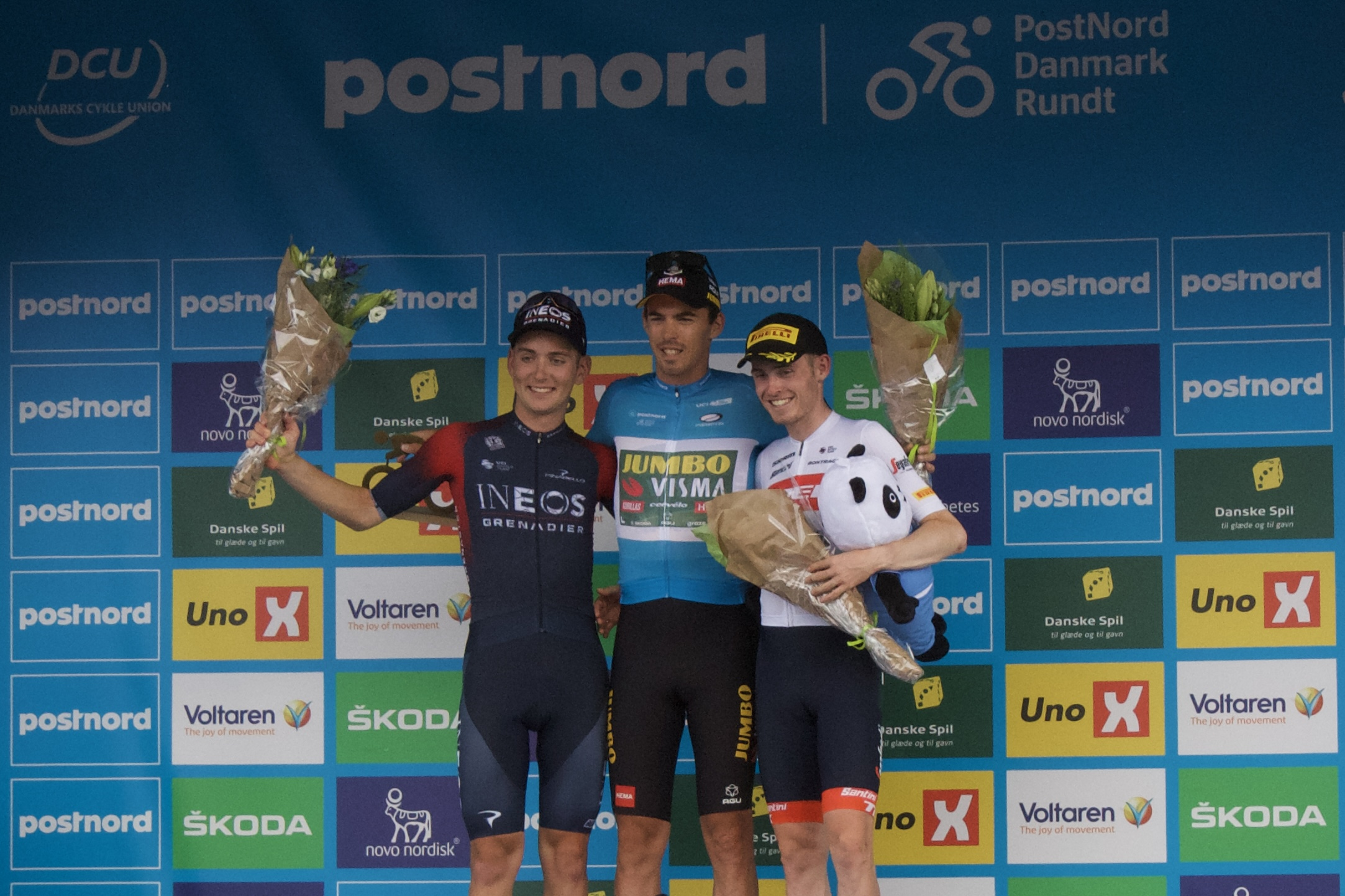
Final podium

The 2022 Danmark Rundt (officially PostNord Danmark Rundt 2022 for sponsorship reasons) was a men's road bicycle race which was held from 16 to 20 August 2022. It was the 31st edition of Danmark Rundt, which was rated as a 2.Pro event on the 2022 UCI Europe Tour and the 2022 UCI ProSeries calendars.

== Teams ==
Seven UCI WorldTeams, seven UCI ProTeams, six UCI Continental teams and the Danish national team (competing as Team Postnord Danmark) made up the twenty-one teams that participated in the race.

UCI WorldTeams

- EF Education–EasyPost
- Ineos Grenadiers
- Israel–Premier Tech
- Quick-Step Alpha Vinyl Team
- Team DSM
- Team Jumbo–Visma
- Trek–Segafredo

UCI ProTeams

- Alpecin–Deceuninck
- Bardiani–CSF–Faizanè
- Bingoal Pauwels Sauces WB
- Human Powered Health
- Sport Vlaanderen–Baloise
- Team Novo Nordisk
- Uno-X Pro Cycling Team

UCI Continental Teams

- BHS–PL Beton Bornholm
- HRE Mazowsze Serce Polski
- Restaurant Suri–Carl Ras
- Riwal Cycling Team
- Team ColoQuick
- Team Coop

National Teams

- Team PostNord Danmark

== Schedule ==
Stage characteristics and winners
Stage	Date	Route	Distance	Type	Stage winner
1	16 August	Allerød to Køge	222.6 km (138.3 mi)	Flat stage	Olav Kooij (NED)
2	17 August	Assens	12.2 km (7.6 mi)	Individual time trial	Magnus Sheffield (USA)
3	18 August	Otterup to Herning	239.3 km (148.7 mi)	Hilly stage	Olav Kooij (NED)
4	19 August	Skive to Skive	167.3 km (104.0 mi)	Flat stage	Jasper Philipsen (BEL)
5	20 August	Give to Vejle	125.9 km (78.2 mi)	Hilly stage	Christophe Laporte (FRA)
Total			767.3 km (476.8 mi)		

== Stages ==
=== Stage 1 ===
16 August 2022 – Allerød to Køge, 222.6 km (138.3 mi)

Stage 1 Result
Rank	Rider	Team	Time
1	Olav Kooij (NED)	Team Jumbo–Visma	4h 59' 20"
2	Jasper Philipsen (BEL)	Alpecin–Deceuninck	+ 0"
3	Timothy Dupont (BEL)	Bingoal Pauwels Sauces WB	+ 0"
4	Magnus Cort (DEN)	EF Education–EasyPost	+ 0"
5	Arvid de Kleijn (NED)	Human Powered Health	+ 0"
6	Jasper Stuyven (BEL)	Trek–Segafredo	+ 0"
7	Andrea Peron (ITA)	Team Novo Nordisk	+ 0"
8	Ethan Vernon (GBR)	Quick-Step Alpha Vinyl Team	+ 0"
9	Luca Colnaghi (ITA)	Bardiani–CSF–Faizanè	+ 0"
10	Jenno Berckmoes (BEL)	Sport Vlaanderen–Baloise	+ 0"

General classification after Stage 1
Rank	Rider	Team	Time
1	Olav Kooij (NED)	Team Jumbo–Visma	4h 59' 10"
2	Jasper Philipsen (BEL)	Alpecin–Deceuninck	+ 4"
3	Sebastian Nielsen (DEN)	Restaurant Suri–Carl Ras	+ 4"
4	Timothy Dupont (BEL)	Bingoal Pauwels Sauces WB	+ 6"
5	Eirik Lunder (NOR)	Team Coop	+ 6"
6	Adrian Banaszek (POL)	HRE Mazowsze Serce Polski	+ 7"
7	Nicklas Amdi Pedersen (DEN)	Team PostNord Danmark	+ 8"
8	Rasmus Bøgh Wallin (DEN)	Restaurant Suri–Carl Ras	+ 9"
9	Magnus Cort (DEN)	EF Education–EasyPost	+ 10"
10	Arvid de Kleijn (NED)	Human Powered Health	+ 10"

=== Stage 2 ===
17 August 2022 – Assens, 12.2 km (7.6 mi) (ITT)

Stage 2 Result
Rank	Rider	Team	Time
1	Magnus Sheffield (USA)	Ineos Grenadiers	13' 35"
2	Mattias Skjelmose Jensen (DEN)	Trek–Segafredo	+ 3"
3	Christophe Laporte (FRA)	Team Jumbo–Visma	+ 6"
4	Geraint Thomas (GBR)	Ineos Grenadiers	+ 15"
5	Søren Kragh Andersen (DEN)	Team DSM	+ 15"
6	Magnus Cort (DEN)	EF Education–EasyPost	+ 20"
7	Johan Price-Pejtersen (DEN)	Team PostNord Danmark	+ 22"
8	Josef Černý (CZE)	Quick-Step Alpha Vinyl Team	+ 24"
9	Jasper Stuyven (BEL)	Trek–Segafredo	+ 24"
10	Lasse Norman Hansen (DEN)	Uno-X Pro Cycling Team	+ 25"

General classification after Stage 2
Rank	Rider	Team	Time
1	Magnus Sheffield (USA)	Ineos Grenadiers	5h 12' 55"
2	Mattias Skjelmose Jensen (DEN)	Trek–Segafredo	+ 3"
3	Christophe Laporte (FRA)	Team Jumbo–Visma	+ 6"
4	Geraint Thomas (GBR)	Ineos Grenadiers	+ 15"
5	Søren Kragh Andersen (DEN)	Team DSM	+ 15"
6	Magnus Cort (DEN)	EF Education–EasyPost	+ 20"
7	Josef Černý (CZE)	Quick-Step Alpha Vinyl Team	+ 24"
8	Jasper Stuyven (BEL)	Trek–Segafredo	+ 24"
9	Lasse Norman Hansen (DEN)	Uno-X Pro Cycling Team	+ 25"
10	Casper Pedersen (DEN)	Team DSM	+ 29"

=== Stage 3 ===
18 August 2022 – Otterup to Herning, 239.3 km (148.7 mi)

Stage 3 Result
Rank	Rider	Team	Time
1	Olav Kooij (NED)	Team Jumbo–Visma	5h 18' 45"
2	Christophe Laporte (FRA)	Team Jumbo–Visma	+ 0"
3	Magnus Cort (DEN)	EF Education–EasyPost	+ 0"
4	Jhonnatan Narvaez (ECU)	Ineos Grenadiers	+ 0"
5	Jasper Stuyven (BEL)	Trek–Segafredo	+ 0"
6	Jasper Philipsen (BEL)	Alpecin–Deceuninck	+ 0"
7	Timothy Dupont (BEL)	Bingoal Pauwels Sauces WB	+ 0"
8	Arvid De Kleijn (NED)	Human Powered Health	+ 0"
9	Andreas Stokbro (DEN)	Team Coop	+ 0"
10	Stanisław Aniołkowski (POL)	Bingoal Pauwels Sauces WB	+ 0"

General classification after Stage 3
Rank	Rider	Team	Time
1	Magnus Sheffield (USA)	Ineos Grenadiers	10h 31' 40"
2	Christophe Laporte (FRA)	Team Jumbo–Visma	+ 0"
3	Mattias Skjelmose Jensen (DEN)	Trek–Segafredo	+ 3"
4	Geraint Thomas (GBR)	Ineos Grenadiers	+ 15"
5	Søren Kragh Andersen (DEN)	Team DSM	+ 15"
6	Magnus Cort (DEN)	EF Education–EasyPost	+ 16"
7	Josef Černý (CZE)	Quick-Step Alpha Vinyl Team	+ 24"
8	Jasper Stuyven (BEL)	Trek–Segafredo	+ 24"
9	Lasse Norman Hansen (DEN)	Uno-X Pro Cycling Team	+ 25"
10	Casper Pedersen (DEN)	Team DSM	+ 29"

=== Stage 4 ===
19 August 2022 – Skive to Skive, 167.3 km (104.0 mi)

Stage 4 Result
Rank	Rider	Team	Time
1	Jasper Philipsen (BEL)	Alpecin–Deceuninck	3h 35' 54"
2	Sasha Weemaes (BEL)	Sport Vlaanderen–Baloise	+ 0"
3	Ethan Vernon (GBR)	Quick-Step Alpha Vinyl Team	+ 0"
4	Jasper Stuyven (BEL)	Trek–Segafredo	+ 0"
5	Nicklas Amdi Pedersen (DEN)	Team PostNord Danmark	+ 0"
6	Taj Jones (AUS)	Israel–Premier Tech	+ 0"
7	Erlend Blikra (NOR)	Uno-X Pro Cycling Team	+ 0"
8	Vito Braet (BEL)	Sport Vlaanderen–Baloise	+ 0"
9	Stanisław Aniołkowski (POL)	Bingoal Pauwels Sauces WB	+ 0"
10	Christophe Laporte (FRA)	Team Jumbo–Visma	+ 0"

General classification after Stage 4
Rank	Rider	Team	Time
1	Magnus Sheffield (USA)	Ineos Grenadiers	14h 07' 34"
2	Christophe Laporte (FRA)	Team Jumbo–Visma	+ 0"
3	Mattias Skjelmose Jensen (DEN)	Trek–Segafredo	+ 3"
4	Geraint Thomas (GBR)	Ineos Grenadiers	+ 15"
5	Søren Kragh Andersen (DEN)	Team DSM	+ 15"
6	Magnus Cort (DEN)	EF Education–EasyPost	+ 16"
7	Jasper Philipsen (BEL)	Alpecin–Deceuninck	+ 21"
8	Josef Černý (CZE)	Quick-Step Alpha Vinyl Team	+ 24"
9	Jasper Stuyven (BEL)	Trek–Segafredo	+ 24"
10	Lasse Norman Hansen (DEN)	Uno-X Pro Cycling Team	+ 25"

=== Stage 5 ===
20 August 2022 – Give to Vejle, 125.9 km (78.2 mi)

Stage 5 Result
Rank	Rider	Team	Time
1	Christophe Laporte (FRA)	Team Jumbo–Visma	2h 53' 56"
2	Magnus Sheffield (USA)	Ineos Grenadiers	+ 0"
3	Mattias Skjelmose Jensen (DEN)	Trek–Segafredo	+ 0"
4	Jhonatan Narváez (ECU)	Ineos Grenadiers	+ 0"
5	Mauro Schmid (SUI)	Quick-Step Alpha Vinyl Team	+ 0"
6	Søren Kragh Andersen (DEN)	Team DSM	+ 0"
7	Mick van Dijke (NED)	Team Jumbo–Visma	+ 4"
8	Magnus Cort (DEN)	EF Education–EasyPost	+ 4"
9	Anthon Charmig (DEN)	Uno-X Pro Cycling Team	+ 4"
10	Alexander Kamp (DEN)	Trek–Segafredo	+ 4"

General classification after Stage 5
Rank	Rider	Team	Time
1	Christophe Laporte (FRA)	Team Jumbo–Visma	17h 01' 20"
2	Magnus Sheffield (USA)	Ineos Grenadiers	+ 4"
3	Mattias Skjelmose Jensen (DEN)	Trek–Segafredo	+ 9"
4	Søren Kragh Andersen (DEN)	Team DSM	+ 25"
5	Magnus Cort (DEN)	EF Education–EasyPost	+ 30"
6	Mauro Schmid (SUI)	Quick-Step Alpha Vinyl Team	+ 42"
7	Mick van Dijke (NED)	Team Jumbo–Visma	+ 44"
8	Stefano Oldani (ITA)	Alpecin–Deceuninck	+ 48"
9	Jasper Stuyven (BEL)	Trek–Segafredo	+ 52"
10	Anthon Charmig (DEN)	Uno-X Pro Cycling Team	+ 56"

== Classification leadership table ==
Classification leadership by stage
Stage	Winner	General classification	Points classification	Mountains classification	Young rider classification	Active rider classification	Team classification
1	Olav Kooij	Olav Kooij	Olav Kooij	Rasmus Bøgh Wallin	Olav Kooij	Nicklas Amdi Pedersen	Team Jumbo–Visma
2	Magnus Sheffield	Magnus Sheffield	Magnus Sheffield	Rasmus Bøgh Wallin	Magnus Sheffield	Nicklas Amdi Pedersen	Team Jumbo–Visma
3	Olav Kooij	Magnus Sheffield	Olav Kooij	Rasmus Bøgh Wallin	Magnus Sheffield	Oliver Knudsen	Team Jumbo–Visma
4	Jasper Philipsen	Magnus Sheffield	Jasper Philipsen	Rasmus Bøgh Wallin	Magnus Sheffield	Rasmus Bøgh Wallin	Team Jumbo–Visma
5	Christophe Laporte	Christophe Laporte	Christophe Laporte	Rasmus Bøgh Wallin	Magnus Sheffield	Rasmus Bøgh Wallin	Trek–Segafredo
Final		Christophe Laporte	Christophe Laporte	Rasmus Bøgh Wallin	Magnus Sheffield	Rasmus Bøgh Wallin	Trek–Segafredo

== Classification standings ==
Legend
Denotes the winner of the general classification	Denotes the winner of the young rider classification
Denotes the winner of the points classification	Denotes the winner of the active rider classification
Denotes the winner of the mountains classification	

=== General classification ===
Final general classification (1–10)
Rank	Rider	Team	Time
1	Christophe Laporte (FRA)	Team Jumbo–Visma	17h 01' 20"
2	Magnus Sheffield (USA)	Ineos Grenadiers	+ 4"
3	Mattias Skjelmose Jensen (DEN)	Trek–Segafredo	+ 9"
4	Søren Kragh Andersen (DEN)	Team DSM	+ 25"
5	Magnus Cort (DEN)	EF Education–EasyPost	+ 30"
6	Mauro Schmid (SUI)	Quick-Step Alpha Vinyl Team	+ 42"
7	Mick van Dijke (NED)	Team Jumbo–Visma	+ 44"
8	Stefano Oldani (ITA)	Alpecin–Deceuninck	+ 48"
9	Jasper Stuyven (BEL)	Trek–Segafredo	+ 52"
10	Anthon Charmig (DEN)	Uno-X Pro Cycling Team	+ 56"

=== Points classification ===
Final points classification (1–10)
Rank	Rider	Team	Points
1	Christophe Laporte (FRA)	Team Jumbo–Visma	40
2	Olav Kooij (NED)	Team Jumbo–Visma	36
3	Jasper Philipsen (BEL)	Alpecin–Deceuninck	34
4	Magnus Cort (DEN)	EF Education–EasyPost	31
5	Magnus Sheffield (USA)	Ineos Grenadiers	30
6	Jasper Stuyven (BEL)	Trek–Segafredo	28
7	Mattias Skjelmose Jensen (DEN)	Trek–Segafredo	22
8	Jhonatan Narváez (ECU)	Ineos Grenadiers	20
9	Søren Kragh Andersen (DEN)	Team DSM	16
10	Sebastian Nielsen (DEN)	Restaurant Suri–Carl Ras	10

=== Mountains classification ===
Final mountains classification (1–10)
Rank	Rider	Team	Points
1	Rasmus Bøgh Wallin (DEN)	Restaurant Suri–Carl Ras	64
2	Anders Foldager (DEN)	Team PostNord Danmark	36
3	Nickolas Zukowsky (CAN)	Human Powered Health	24
4	Mathias Bregnhøj (DEN)	Riwal Cycling Team	16
5	Magnus Henneberg (DEN)	Team PostNord Danmark	16
6	Frederik Irgens Jensen (DEN)	BHS–PL Beton Bornholm	12
7	Gilles De Wilde (BEL)	Sport Vlaanderen–Baloise	12
8	Nicklas Amdi Pedersen (DEN)	Team PostNord Danmark	12
9	Jeppe Aaskov Pallesen (DEN)	Team ColoQuick	8
10	Tim Declercq (BEL)	Quick-Step Alpha Vinyl Team	8

=== Young rider classification ===
Final young rider classification (1–10)
Rank	Rider	Team	Time
1	Magnus Sheffield (USA)	Ineos Grenadiers	17h 01' 24"
2	Mattias Skjelmose Jensen (DEN)	Trek–Segafredo	+ 5"
3	Mick van Dijke (NED)	Team Jumbo–Visma	+ 40"
4	Jenno Berckmoes (BEL)	Sport Vlaanderen–Baloise	+ 1' 14"
5	Frederik Wandahl (BEL)	Team PostNord Danmark	+ 1' 30"
6	Tobias Lund Andresen (DEN)	Team DSM	+ 1' 43"
7	Corbin Strong (NZL)	Israel–Premier Tech	+ 2' 13"
8	Olav Kooij (NED)	Team Jumbo–Visma	+ 7' 56"
9	Joshua Gudnitz (DEN)	Team ColoQuick	+ 10' 43"
10	Kasper Andersen (DEN)	Team PostNord Danmark	+ 12' 11"

=== Active rider classification ===
Final active rider classification (1–9)
Rank	Rider	Team	Points
1	Rasmus Bøgh Wallin (DEN)	Restaurant Suri–Carl Ras	20
2	Oliver Knudsen (DEN)	Restaurant Suri–Carl Ras	12
3	Mathias Bregnhøj (DEN)	Riwal Cycling Team	12
4	Nicklas Amdi Pedersen (DEN)	Team PostNord Danmark	12
5	Mads Baadgaard Rahbek (DEN)	BHS–PL Beton Bornholm	8
6	Anders Foldager (DEN)	Team PostNord Danmark	8
7	Tim Declercq (BEL)	Quick-Step Alpha Vinyl Team	4
8	Mads Østergaard Kristensen (DEN)	Team ColoQuick	4
9	Jeppe Aaskov Pallesen (DEN)	Team ColoQuick	4

=== Team classification ===
Final team classification (1–10)
Rank	Team	Time
1	Trek–Segafredo	56h 01' 10"
2	Team Jumbo–Visma	+ 16"
3	Ineos Grenadiers	+ 33"
4	Quick-Step Alpha Vinyl Team	+ 34"
5	Alpecin–Deceuninck	+ 2' 14"
6	Sport Vlaanderen–Baloise	+ 2' 54"
7	Uno-X Pro Cycling Team	+ 4' 41"
8	EF Education–EasyPost	+ 5' 12"
9	Riwal Cycling Team	+ 6' 05"
10	BHS–PL Beton Bornholm	+ 6' 43"
