= 2020 UCI Cycling Esports World Championships =

Cycling world championships

- Venue: Zwift, Watopia
- Date: 9 December 2020
- Events: 2

The 2020 UCI Cycling Esports World Championships was the first edition of the UCI Cycling Esports World Championships, the annual world championships for esport road bicycle racing. It was held on 9 December 2020 on the platform Zwift.

The men's race was won by Jason Osborne, an Olympic rower for Germany, while the women's race was won by Ashleigh Moolman Pasio, a South African professional road cyclist. Both winners received $9,600 in prize money.

== Schedule ==
| Date | Platform | Location | Event | Distance |
|---|---|---|---|---|
| 9 December | Zwift | Watopia | Men's road race | 50 kilometres (31 mi) |
| 9 December | Zwift | Watopia | Women's road race | 50 kilometres (31 mi) |

== Results ==
=== Men's race ===
Result (1–10)
| Rank | Rider | Team | Time |
|---|---|---|---|
| Gold medal | Jason Osborne (GER) | Germany | 1h 05' 15" |
| Silver medal | Anders Foldager (DEN) | Denmark | + 1.74" |
| Bronze medal | Nicklas Pedersen (DEN) | Denmark | + 2.09" |
| 4 | Ollie Jones (NZL) | New Zealand | + 2.53" |
| 5 | Ben Hill (AUS) | Australia | + 2.55" |
| 6 | Lionel Vujasin (BEL) | Belgium | + 2.73" |
| 7 | Matteo Dal-Cin (CAN) | Canada | + 2.88" |
| 8 | Freddy Ovett (AUS) | Australia | + 3.05" |
| 9 | Ryan Larson (USA) | United States | + 3.10" |
| 10 | Jonas Iversby Hvideberg (NOR) | Norway | + 3.11" |

=== Women's race ===
Result (1–10)
| Rank | Rider | Team | Time |
|---|---|---|---|
| Gold medal | Ashleigh Moolman Pasio (RSA) | South Africa | 1h 13' 27" |
| Silver medal | Sarah Gigante (AUS) | Australia | + 0.064" |
| Bronze medal | Cecilia Hansen (SWE) | Sweden | + 1.24" |
| 4 | Lauren Stephens (USA) | United States | + 1.26" |
| 5 | Jacquie Godbe (USA) | United States | + 1.39" |
| 6 | Annika Langvad (DEN) | Denmark | + 1.42" |
| 7 | Lauren Matsen Ko (USA) | United States | + 1.53" |
| 8 | Emma Belforth (SWE) | Sweden | + 1.66" |
| 9 | Kristin Kulchinsky (USA) | United States | + 5.22" |
| 10 | Bre Vine (AUS) | Australia | + 6.11" |
