= Kasper Borremans =

Finnish cyclist (born 2006)

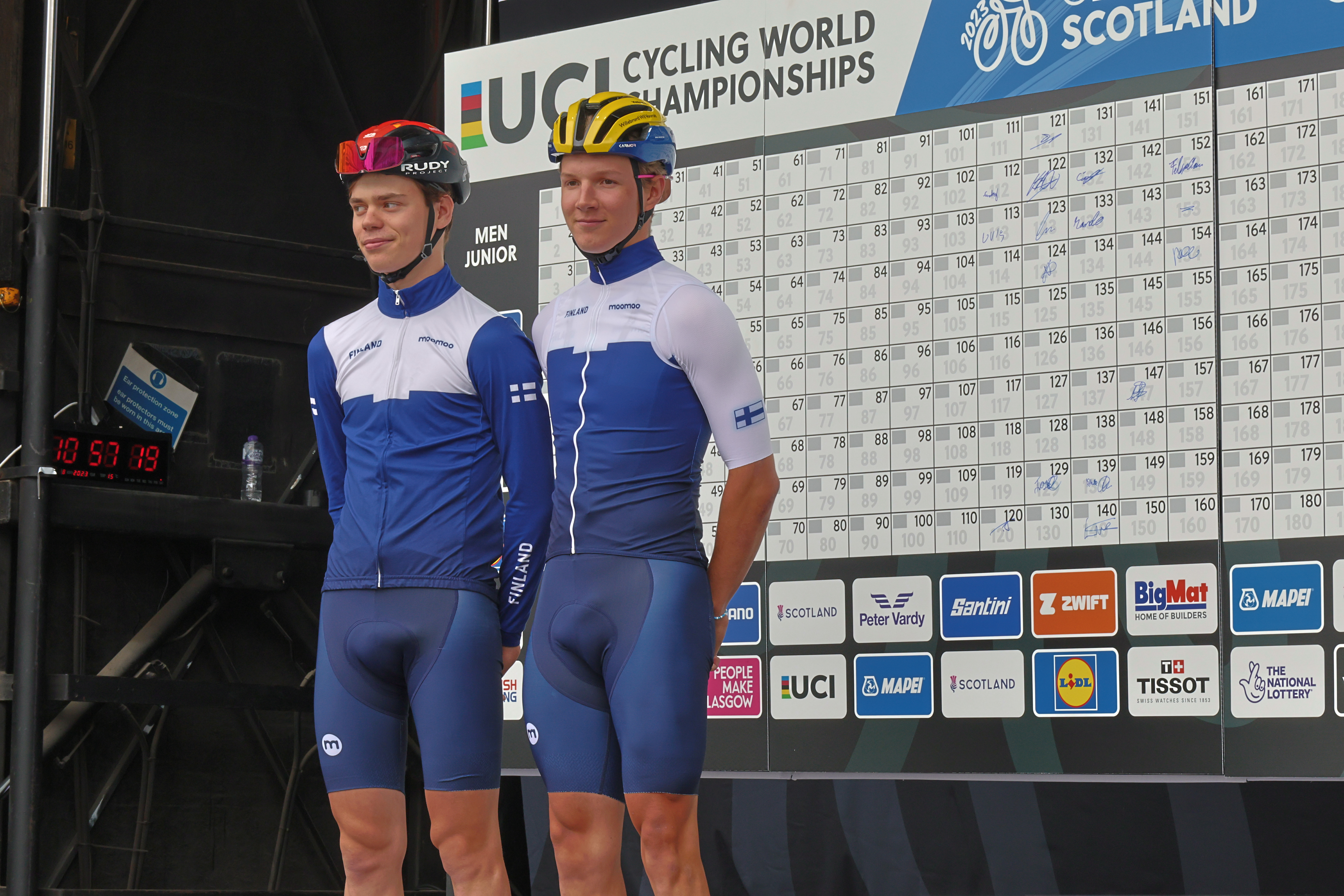
- Borremans (left) at the 2023 UCI Road World Championships

Personal information
- Born: 23 August 2006 (age 20) Hyvinkää, Finland

Cycling career
- Sport: Cycling
- Current team: Bahrain Victorious Development Team
- Disciplines: Road; Cyclo-cross
- Role: Rider
- Rider type: Climber

Amateur team
- 2023–2024: Cannibal B Victorious

Professional team
- 2025–: Bahrain Victorious Development Team
Medal record
Men's cycling esports
Representing Finland
World Championships
Gold medal – first place	2024 MyWhoosh	Men's race

Kasper Borremans (born 21 August 2006) is a Finnish professional road racing cyclist who rides for UCI Continental team Bahrain Victorious Development Team. In 2024, he finished third in the men's UCI Cycling Esports World Championships.

== Early life ==
From Hyvinkää, in 2022, he was chosen to represent Finland at the European Youth Olympic Festival in Banská Bystrica, Slovakia.

== Career ==
He rode for the Cannibal B Victorious international road team in 2023 and 2024. In 2023, he finished third in the E3 Saxo Classic Juniors in Flanders. He won the U19 category of the Finnish road cycling championship in the combined start and time trial in 2024.

In October 2024, he finished third in the men's UCI Cycling Esports World Championships in Abu Dhabi.

Ahead of the 2025 season, he signed a four-year contract with UCI WorldTeam Team Bahrain Victorious, with the plan that he would initially spend two years with their development side, the UCI Continental team Bahrain Victorious Development Team. In August 2026, he won montage stage at the Tour de l'Avenir.

== Personal life ==
Borremans has a background in cross-country skiing whilst growing up in Finland. He has a Finnish mother and a Belgian father. When he is racing on the continent he stays with his paternal grandparents in Sint-Pieters-Leeuw in Flemish Brabant.

== Major results ==
=== Road ===
2023
National Junior Road Championships

1st Time trial
4th Road race

2nd Tour du Condroz
2nd Mémorial Antoine Demoitié
3rd Overall Tour de DMZ

1st Stage 3
1st Mountains classification

3rd Overall La Philippe Gilbert Juniors

1st Young rider classification

3rd E3 Saxo Bank Classic Juniors
3rd Klimkoers Herbeumont Juniors
9th Overall Watersley Junior Challenge
2024
National Junior Road Championships

1st Road race
1st Time trial

1st Mountains classification, Course de la Paix Juniors
1st Klimkoers Herbeumont Juniors
2nd Overall Aubel–Thimister–Stavelot

1st Stage 2b

3rd UCI Esports World Championships
3rd Overall La Philippe Gilbert Juniors
4th GP Général Patton
4th Grand Prix de Luxembourg
10th Overall Trofeo Comune di Pieve del Grappa
2025
2nd Overall Tour of Małopolska

1st Young rider classification

8th Overall Visit South Aegean Islands
8th GP Capodarco
10th Overall Sibiu Cycling Tour
2026
1st Stage 6 Tour de l'Avenir
3rd Overall Oberösterreich Rundfahrt
3rd GP Capodarco
3rd Flèche Ardennaise
6th Gran Premio Sportivi di Poggiana
7th Overall Giro della Valle d'Aosta

1st Mountains classification

9th Giro del Belvedere
9th À travers les Hautes Fagnes

=== Cyclo-cross ===
2023–2024
1st National Junior Championships
Junior X²O Badkamers Trophy

3rd Melden
