= Magnus Sheffield =

American cyclist (born 2002)

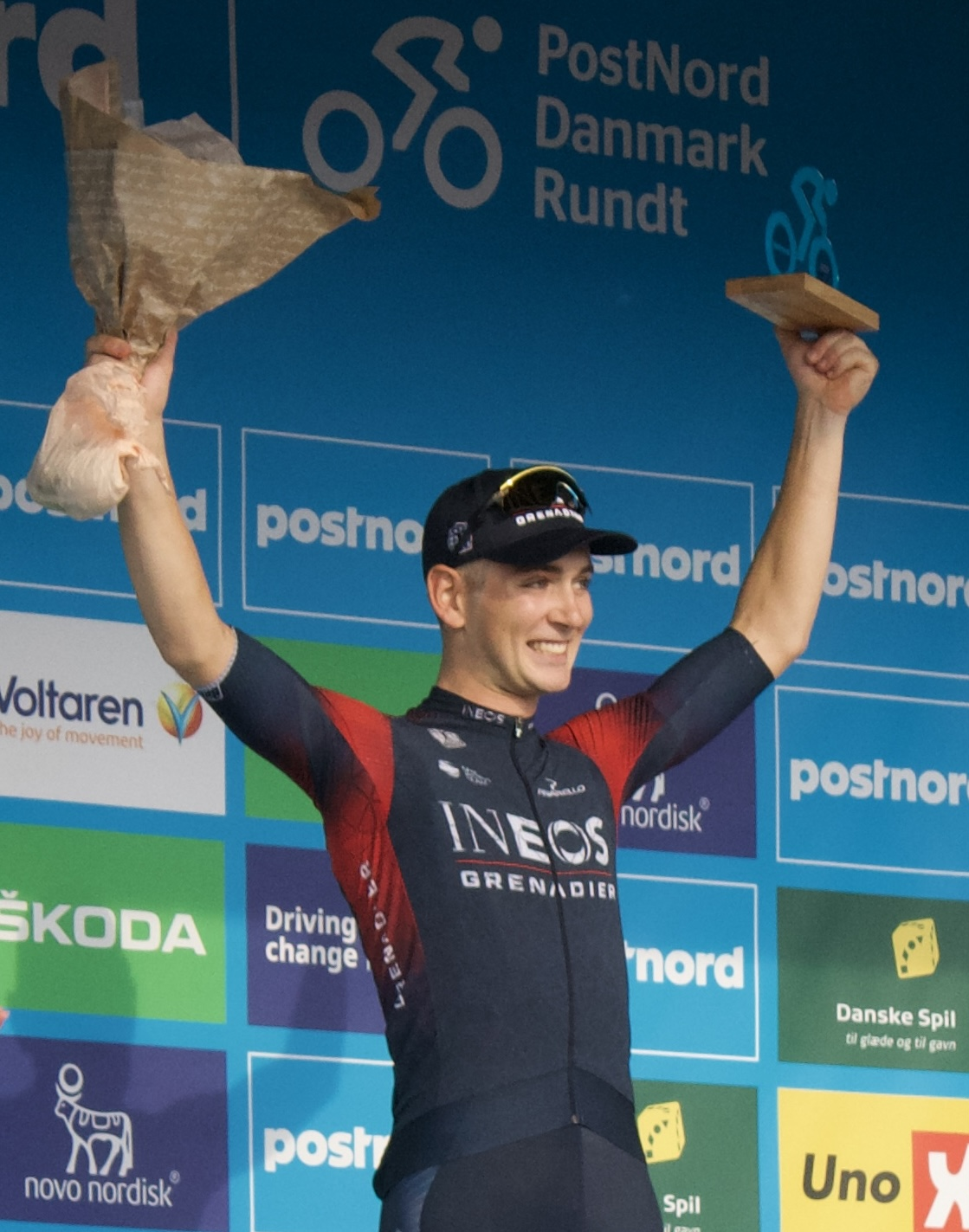
- Sheffield after stage 2 of the 2022 Danmark Rundt

Personal information
- Full name: Magnus Bratli Sheffield
- Born: April 19, 2002 (age 24) Pittsford, New York, U.S.
- Height: 6 ft 1 in (185 cm)
- Weight: 163 lb (74 kg)

Cycling career
- Sport: Cycling
- Current team: Netcompany–Ineos
- Discipline: Road
- Role: Rider
- Rider type: All-rounder; Time trialist

Amateur team
- 2018–2020: Hot Tubes Cycling

Professional teams
- 2021: Rally Cycling
- 2022–: INEOS Grenadiers

Major wins
- One-day races and Classics Brabantse Pijl (2022)
Medal record
Men's road bicycle racing
Representing United States
World Championships
| Bronze medal – third place | 2019 Yorkshire | Junior road race |

Magnus Bratli Sheffield (born April 19, 2002) is an American-Norwegian cyclist who rides for UCI WorldTeam Netcompany–Ineos.

Magnus Sheffield left Rally Cycling in August 2021 for unknown reasons ahead of his 2022 season with Ineos.

In April 2022 Sheffield won Brabantse Pijl, one of the Flanders Classics races. He finished +0:37 ahead of French riders Warren Barguil and Benoît Cosnefroy, becoming the first American to win this race and the first American to win any one of these classics since Tyler Farrar over a decade earlier.

== Major results ==
=== Road ===
2019
2nd Overall Keizer der Juniores

1st Young rider classification
1st Stages 1 & 2b

3rd Road race, UCI World Junior Championships
3rd Overall Grand Prix Rüebliland

1st Young rider classification

8th Overall Driedaagse van Axel

1st Young rider classification

2020
1st Overall Valley of the Sun Stage Race

1st Stage 1

2021
10th Time trial, UCI World Under-23 Championships
2022 (3 pro wins)
1st Brabantse Pijl
1st Stage 3 Vuelta a Andalucía
National Championships

2nd Time trial
3rd Road race

2nd Overall Danmark Rundt

1st Young rider classification
1st Stage 2 (ITT)

6th Overall Tour of Norway
10th Overall Tour of Britain
2023
2nd Overall Tour of Norway
4th Overall Tour Down Under

1st Young rider classification

4th Overall Tour of Britain

1st Young rider classification

4th Overall CRO Race

1st Young rider classification

2024
3rd Overall Tour of Austria

1st Young rider classification

5th Overall Tour de Pologne
6th Tour of Flanders
2025 (1)
4th Overall Paris–Nice

1st Stage 8

5th Overall CRO Race
6th Trofeo Laigueglia
7th Overall Tour Down Under
7th Cadel Evans Great Ocean Road Race
10th Overall Settimana Internazionale di Coppi e Bartali
2026
6th Overall Volta a la Comunitat Valenciana
9th Overall Tirreno–Adriatico

==== General classification results timeline ====
Grand Tour general classification results
| Grand Tour | 2022 | 2023 | 2024 | 2025 | 2026 |
| Giro d'Italia | — | — | 59 | — | |
| Tour de France | — | — | — | — | |
| Vuelta a España | — | — | — | 65 | |
Major stage race general classification results
| Race | 2022 | 2023 | 2024 | 2025 | 2026 |
| Paris–Nice | — | — | — | 4 | — |
| Tirreno–Adriatico | — | 28 | 16 | — | 9 |
| Volta a Catalunya | — | — | — | — | — |
| Tour of the Basque Country | — | — | — | — | — |
| Tour de Romandie | 48 | — | 55 | — | |
| Critérium du Dauphiné | — | — | — | 71 | |
| Tour de Suisse | — | DNF | — | — | |

==== Classics results timeline ====
| Monument | 2022 | 2023 | 2024 | 2025 |
|---|---|---|---|---|
| Milan–San Remo | — | 24 | — | — |
| Tour of Flanders | 69 | 28 | 6 | 20 |
| Paris–Roubaix | OTL | 92 | — | — |
| Liège–Bastogne–Liège | — | 38 | — | 41 |
| Giro di Lombardia | — | 111 | — | — |
| Classic | 2022 | 2023 | 2024 | 2025 |
| Great Ocean Road Race | — | — | — | 7 |
| Omloop Het Nieuwsblad | 108 | 22 | — | — |
| Kuurne–Brussels–Kuurne | 29 | 24 | — | — |
| Strade Bianche | — | 56 | 18 | — |
| Dwars door Vlaanderen | 15 | 52 | 119 | 25 |
| Brabantse Pijl | 1 | — | — | — |
| Amstel Gold Race | 125 | 46 | — | 51 |

Legend
| — | Did not compete |
| DNF | Did not finish |

=== Cyclo-cross ===
2018–2019
1st Pan American Junior Championships
3rd National Junior Championships
2019–2020
3rd National Junior Championships
