= 2023 Per sempre Alfredo =

2023 UCI Europe Tour

Race details
- Dates: 19 March 2023
- Stages: 1
- Distance: 190.42 km (118.3 mi)
- Winning time: 4h 31' 03"

Results
	Winner	Felix Engelhardt (GER)	(Team Jayco–AlUla)
	Second	Mark Stewart (GBR)	(Bolton Equities Black Spoke)
	Third	Anders Foldager (DEN)	(Biesse–Carrera–Premac)

The 2023 Per sempre Alfredo was the 3rd edition of the Per sempre Alfredo road cycling one day race, which was held on 19 March 2023, starting in the city of Florence and finishing in Alfredo Martini's home town of Sesto Fiorentino.

The race was won in a sprint by Felix Engelhardt (Team Jayco–AIS) ahead of Mark Stewart (Bolton Equities Black Spoke) and Anders Foldager Biesse–Carrera–Premac.

== Teams ==
Three UCI WorldTeams, six UCI ProTeams, ten UCI Continental teams, made up the nineteen teams that participated in the race. Twelve teams entered seven riders, five teams entered six riders and two teams (Team Jayco–AlUla and Team Colpack–Ballan) entered five riders each, for a total of 124 riders, of which 65 finished.

UCI WorldTeams

- Ineos Grenadiers
- EF Education–EasyPost
- Team Jayco–AlUla

UCI ProTeams

- Wagner Bazin WB
- Bolton Equities Black Spoke
- Team Polti VisitMalta
- VF Group–Bardiani–CSF–Faizanè
- Q36.5 Pro Cycling Team
- Team Solution Tech–Vini Fantini

UCI Continental Teams

- Beltrami TSA–Tre Colli
- Biesse–Carrera–Premac
- D'Amico–UM Tools
- Gallina Ecotek Lucchini
- General Store–Essegibi–Fratelli Curia
- GW Erco Shimano
- MG.K vis Colors for Peace
- Team Colpack–Ballan–CSB
- Team Technipes #inEmiliaRomagna
- Work Service–Vitalcare–Dynatek

== Result ==
Result
Rank	Rider	Team	Time
1	Felix Engelhardt (GER)	Team Jayco–AlUla	4h 31' 03"
2	Mark Stewart (GBR)	Bolton Equities Black Spoke	+ 0"
3	Anders Foldager (DEN)	Biesse–Carrera–Premac	+ 0"
4	Filippo Fiorelli (ITA)	VF Group–Bardiani–CSF–Faizanè	+ 0"
5	Sergio Meris (ITA)	MBH Bank Ballan CSB	+ 0"
6	Rémy Mertz (BEL)	Wagner Bazin WB	+ 0"
7	Kim Heiduk (GER)	Ineos Grenadiers	+ 0"
8	Walter Calzoni (ITA)	Q36.5 Pro Cycling Team	+ 0"
9	Álex Martín (ESP)	Team Polti VisitMalta	+ 0"
10	Lennert Teugels (BEL)	Wagner Bazin WB	+ 0"
