= Sergio Meris =

Italian cyclist

Personal information
- Born: 10 March 2001 (age 25) Bergamo, Italy
- Height: 1.80 m (5 ft 11 in)

Cycling career
- Sport: Cycling
- Current team: Unibet Rose Rockets
- Discipline: Road
- Role: Rider

Amateur team
- 2018–2019: Team LVF

Professional teams
- 2021–2024: Team Colpack–Ballan
- 2025–: Unibet Tietema Rockets

Sergio Meris (born 10 March 2001) is an Italian road cyclist, who rides for UCI ProTeam Unibet Rose Rockets.

== Major results ==
2019
1st Trofeo Emilio Paganessi
7th Gran Premio dell'Arno
8th Trofeo Buffoni
2022
1st Giro del Casentino
5th Trofeo Alcide Degasperi
7th Trofeo Città di San Vendemiano
7th Trofeo Città di Meldola
8th Giro del Medio Brenta
2023
1st Stage 4 Giro della Valle d'Aosta
2nd Trofeo Alcide Degasperi
4th Trofeo Piva
5th Per sempre Alfredo
9th Trofeo Città di San Vendemiano
10th Overall Tour de Bretagne
10th Giro del Belvedere
10th G.P. Palio del Recioto
2024
1st Giro del Medio Brenta
4th Coppa Città di San Daniele
5th Gran Premio Santa Rita
8th Poreč Trophy
