= Oviatt =

Oviatt is an English surname, probably a variant of Ovett, a name of unknown origin which is found mainly in Sussex. Notable people with the surname include:

- Candace Oviatt, American ecologist
- Miles M. Oviatt (1840–1880), American Civl War Medal of Honor recipient
- Orson Minott Oviatt (1799–1869), American general and postmaster
- Sharon Oviatt, Canadian computer scientist

== See also ==
- Oviatt Cole, Ohio State Auditor from 1863 to 1864
