= Jay Vine =

Australian cyclist (born 1995)

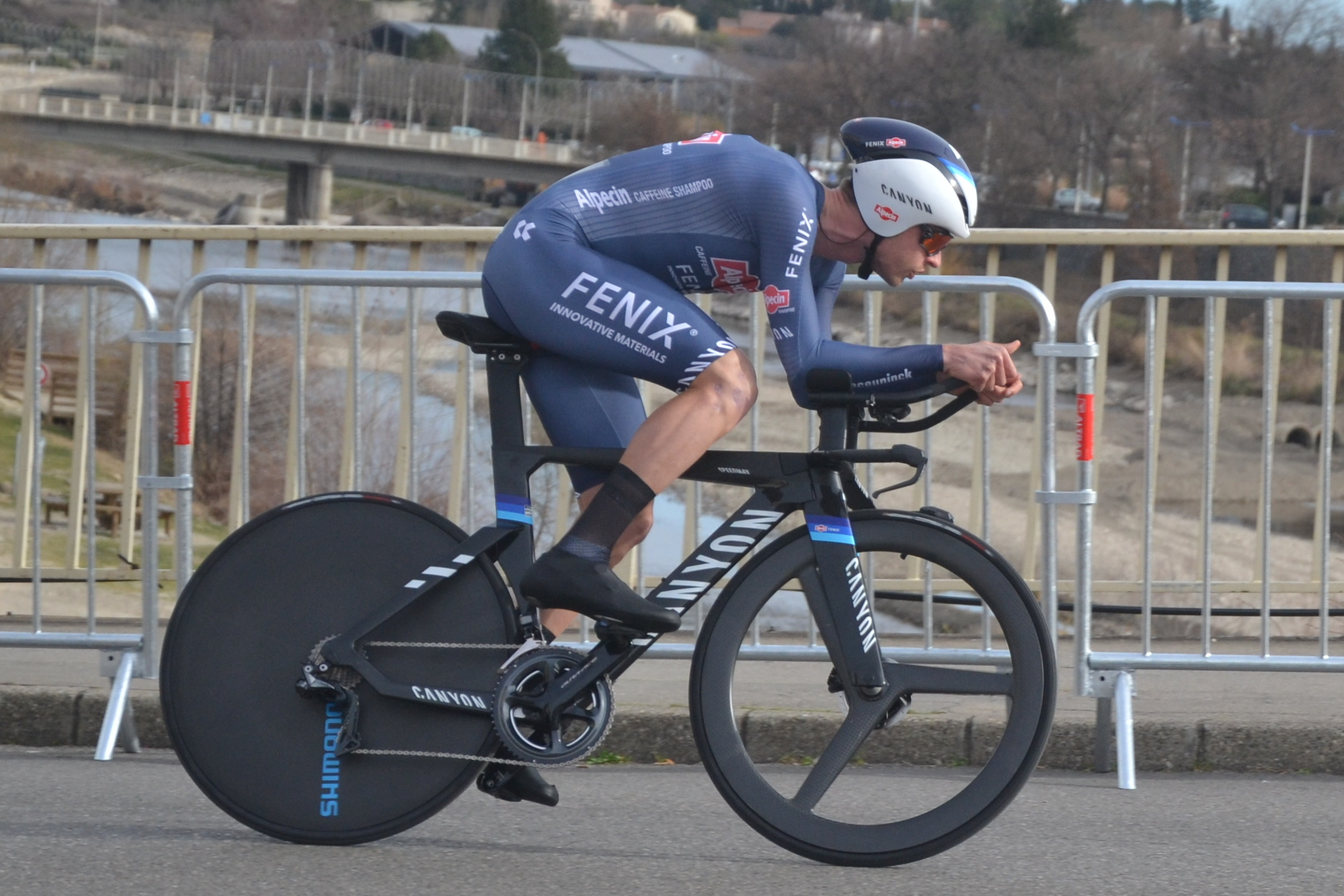
- Vine at the 2022 Étoile de Bessèges

Personal information
- Full name: Jay Vine
- Born: 16 November 1995 (age 30) Townsville, Queensland, Australia
- Height: 1.84 m (6 ft 0 in)
- Weight: 69 kg (152 lb)

Cycling career
- Sport: Cycling
- Current team: UAE Team Emirates XRG
- Discipline: Road
- Role: Rider
- Rider type: Climber, Time trialist

Professional teams
- 2019–2020: Nero Bianchi
- 2021–2022: Alpecin–Fenix
- 2023–: UAE Team Emirates

Major wins
- Grand Tours Vuelta a España Mountains classification (2024, 2025) 4 individual stages (2022, 2025) 1 TTT stage (2025) Stage races Tour Down Under (2023, 2026) One-day races and Classics National Time Trial Championships (2023, 2026)
Medal record
Representing Australia
Men's road bicycle racing
World Championships
Gold medal – first place	2024 Zurich	Mixed team relay
Gold medal – first place	2025 Kigali	Mixed team relay
Silver medal – second place	2025 Kigali	Elite time trial
Men's Cycling Esports
World Championships
Gold medal – first place	2022 New York	Men's race

Jay Vine (born 16 November 1995) is an Australian professional racing cyclist who currently rides for UCI WorldTeam UAE Team Emirates XRG.

== Career ==
In December 2020, Vine was initially announced to be joining UCI Continental team ARA Pro Racing Sunshine Coast for the 2021 season. However, as a result of winning the 2020 Zwift Academy program, he earned a professional contract with Belgian UCI ProTeam Alpecin–Fenix.

Vine made his Grand Tour debut in the 2021 Vuelta a España, ultimately placing 73rd. He also featured in several breakaways, the most notable of which were on stages 12 and 14. On stage 12, he was the last remaining rider of a late breakaway attempt and was caught inside the final kilometre. Two stages later, with 35 kilometres (22 mi) left, Vine dropped back to his team car, and as he was collecting something, he drifted into the side of the car and crashed. He suffered moderate road rash but was able to recover and place third on the summit finish to Pico Villuercas. As a result of his performances during the Vuelta, Alpecin–Fenix extended his contract by two years.

On 26 February 2022, Vine won the men's race at the 2022 UCI Cycling Esports World Championships.

In August 2022, Vine rode his second Grand Tour at the Vuelta. On stage six, which finished atop the climb of Pico Jano, Vine attacked from the GC group at around 10 kilometres (6 mi) from the finish. After catching and passing Mark Padun, the remaining lone breakaway rider, Vine held off the GC contenders to win the stage, taking his first win as a professional. He finished 15 and 16 seconds ahead of Remco Evenepoel and Enric Mas, respectively. Two days later, on the race's second mountaintop finish, Vine got into the break that contested the stage win. On the final climb of Collau Fancuaya, Vine dropped his breakaway companions to take his second stage win of the race, taking the lead in the mountains classification in the process. He crashed out of the race on stage 18 while wearing the polka dot jersey.

In April 2024, Vine fractured a cervical and two thoracic vertebrae in a crash during the Tour of the Basque Country. It was feared that he might never walk again, but he was back racing four months later in the 2024 Vuelta a España where he won the mountains classification for the first time. He went on to represent Australia at the 2024 UCI Road World Championships in Zurich, winning a gold medal in the mixed team relay along with fellow Canberran Michael Matthews. He was named men's athlete of the year in the 2024 Canberra Sports Awards.

On 28 August 2025, Vine won the 6th stage of the 2025 Vuelta a España, thus moving into the lead in the race's mountains classification (the polka dot jersey). He was named men's athlete of the year in the 2025 Canberra Sports Awards.

In January 2026, Vine won the General Classification of the 2026 Tour Down Under, despite a crash on the final stage following a kangaroo hopping into the peloton, in which Vine broke his wrist.

== Personal life ==
Vine and his wife Bre, fellow cyclist/full time manager support, live in Andorra. On 14 August 2024, just before his start at the 2024 Vuelta a España, they welcomed their first son.

== Major results ==
2019
1st Overall Tour of the Tropics

1st Stage 3

3rd Overall New Zealand Cycle Classic
7th Road race, Oceania Road Championships
2020
1st Stage 1 Australian National Road Series
2nd Peaks Challenge Falls Creek
5th Overall Herald Sun Tour
2021
2nd Overall Tour of Turkey
2022 (2 pro wins)
1st UCI Esports World Championships
Vuelta a España

1st Stages 6 & 8
Held after Stages 8–17

1st Mountains classification, Étoile de Bessèges
2nd Overall Tour of Turkey
2nd Overall Tour of Norway
2023 (3)
1st Time trial, National Road Championships
1st Overall Tour Down Under
Tour of Turkey

1st Mountains classification
1st Stage 7

8th Overall Vuelta a Burgos
2024 (1)
UCI Road World Championships

1st Team relay
5th Time trial

Vuelta a España

1st Mountains classification
Combativity award Stage 15

1st Stage 4 (ITT) Vuelta a Burgos
1st Stage 3 (TTT) Paris–Nice
2025 (5)
UCI Road World Championships

1st Team relay
2nd Time trial

Vuelta a España

1st Mountains classification
1st Stages 5 (TTT), 6 & 10
Combativity award Stage 6

Settimana Internazionale di Coppi e Bartali

1st Points classification
1st Stages 3 & 5

2nd Time trial, National Road Championships
2nd Chrono des Nations
3rd Overall Tour de Romandie

1st Points classification
1st Stage 3

3rd Trofeo Tessile & Moda
9th Giro di Lombardia
2026 (3)
1st Time trial, National Road Championships
1st Overall Tour Down Under

1st Stage 2

=== Grand Tour general classification results timeline ===
Grand Tour	2021	2022	2023	2024	2025	2026
Giro d'Italia	—	—	34	—	DNF	DNF
Tour de France	—	—	—	—	—	
Vuelta a España	73	DNF	DNF	57	30	

Legend
—	Did not compete
DNF	Did not finish
