= Jason Osborne (sportsman) =

German rower (born 1994)

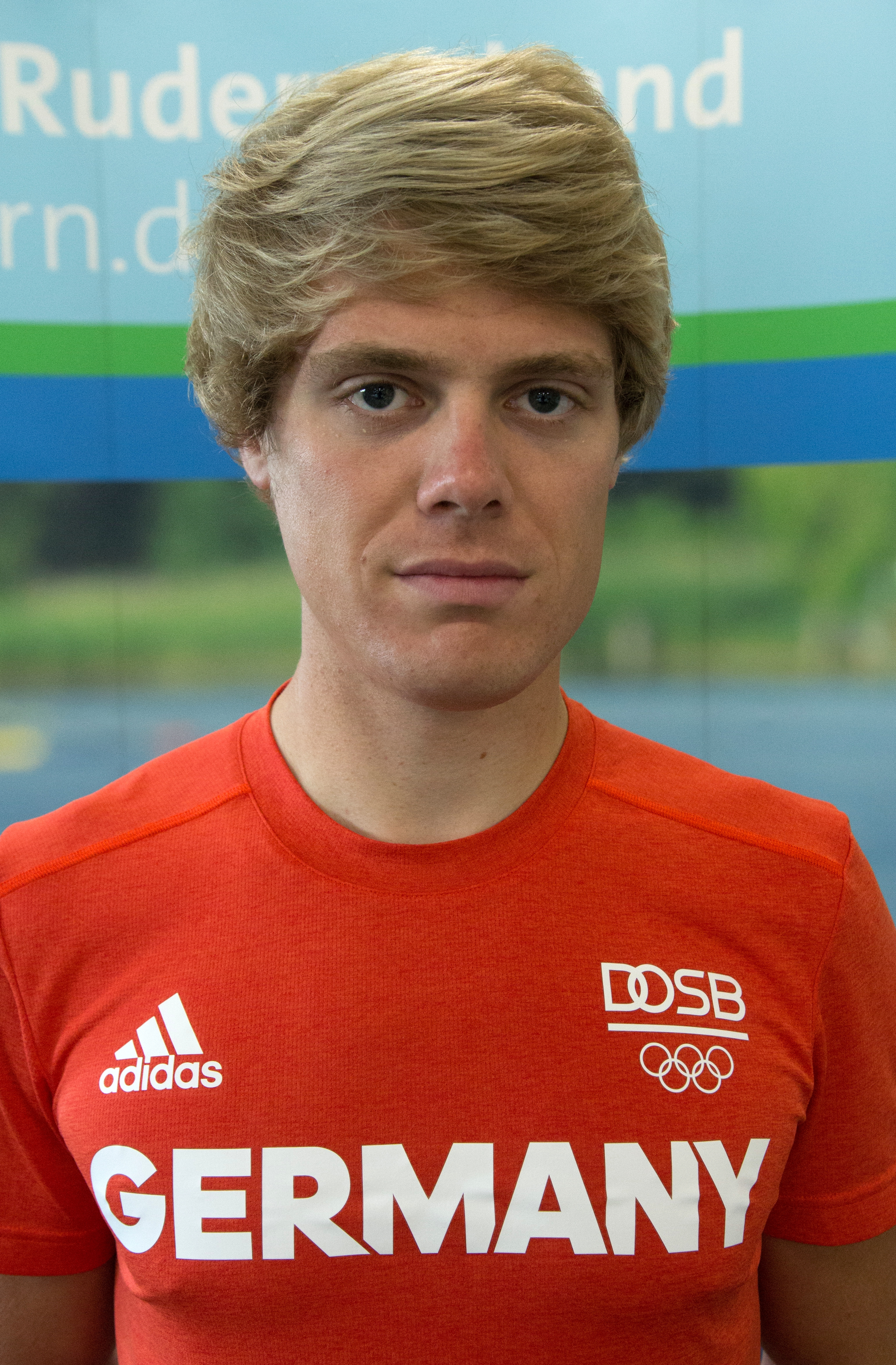
- Osborne in 2017

Personal information
- Nationality: German
- Born: 20 March 1994 (age 32) Mönchengladbach, Germany
- Height: 1.78 m (5 ft 10 in)
- Weight: 70 kg (154 lb)
- Cycling career
- Sport: Cycling
- Current team: Retired
- Discipline: Road
- Role: Rider

Professional teams
- 2021: Deceuninck–Quick-Step (stagiaire)
- 2022: Alpecin–Fenix Development Team
- 2023–2024: Alpecin–Deceuninck

Sport
- Country: Germany
- Sport: Rowing, road cycling
- Events: Lightweight single sculls, Lightweight double sculls, Lightweight quad sculls
- Club: Mainzer Ruder-Verein 1878 e.V.
Medal record
Men's rowing
Representing Germany
Olympic Games
| Silver medal – second place | 2020 Tokyo | Lwt double sculls |
World Championships
| Gold medal – first place | 2018 Plovdiv | Lwt single sculls |
| Silver medal – second place | 2013 Chungju | Lwt quad sculls |
| Bronze medal – third place | 2019 Ottensheim | Lwt double sculls |
European Championships
| Gold medal – first place | 2019 Lucerne | Lwt double sculls |
| Silver medal – second place | 2016 Brandenburg | Lwt double sculls |
Men's Cycling Esports
Representing Germany
World Championships
| Gold medal – first place | 2020 Watopia | Men's race |
| Gold medal – first place | 2024 MyWhoosh | Men's race |
| Silver medal – second place | 2023 Glasgow | Men's race |
| Bronze medal – third place | 2022 New York | Men's race |

Jason Osborne (born 20 March 1994) is a German former rower and former professional road cyclist, who rode for UCI WorldTeam Alpecin–Deceuninck. He won silver as part of the German team in the lightweight men's quadruple sculls at the 2013 World Rowing Championships in Chungju, Korea. He has also won medals in a number of competitions in the World Rowing Cup and European Championships. He competed in the men's lightweight double sculls event at the 2016 Summer Olympics.

On 9 December 2020, he won the first edition of the UCI Cycling Esports World Championships, organised on the online cycling platform Zwift. After this result, he was signed as a stagiaire for UCI WorldTeam Deceuninck–Quick-Step. The following season he joined UCI Continental team Alpecin–Fenix Development Team in June 2022, before being promoted to Alpecin–Deceuninck for the 2023 season.

== Major cycling results ==
2020
1st UCI Esports World Championships
2022
1st Overall Province Cycling Tour

1st Points classification
1st Stage 4

1st Overall Ronde van Vlaams-Brabant

1st Stage 3

3rd UCI Esports World Championships
2023
2nd Overall Tour of Austria

2024
1st UCI Esports World Championships

2025
1st UCI Esports World Championships

=== Grand Tour general classification results timeline ===
| Grand Tour | 2023 |
|---|---|
| Giro d'Italia | — |
| Tour de France | — |
| Vuelta a España | 131 |

Legend
| — | Did not compete |
| DNF | Did not finish |
