= 2023 Tour Down Under =

Cycling race

2023 Men's Tour Down Under
2023 UCI World Tour, race 1 of 35

Race details
- Dates: 17–22 January 2023
- Stages: 6
- Distance: 672.7 km (418.0 mi)
- Winning time: 16h 07' 41"

Results
Jersey awarded to the overall winner	Winner	Jay Vine (AUS)	(UAE Team Emirates)
	Second	Simon Yates (GBR)	(Team Jayco–AlUla)
	Third	Pello Bilbao (ESP)	(Team Bahrain Victorious)
Jersey awarded to the mountains classification winner	Mountains	Mikkel Frølich Honoré (DEN)	(EF Education–EasyPost)
Jersey awarded to the young rider classification winner	Young rider	Magnus Sheffield (USA)	(INEOS Grenadiers)
Jersey awarded to the sprints classification winner	Sprints	Michael Matthews (AUS)	(Team Jayco–AlUla)
	Team	(United Arab Emirates) UAE Team Emirates	

The 2023 Men's Tour Down Under was a road cycling stage race that took place between 17 and 22 January 2023 in and around Adelaide, South Australia. It was the 23rd edition of the Tour Down Under and the first race of the 2023 UCI World Tour. It was the first edition of the Tour Down Under to be held since 2020, as the 2021 and 2022 editions were cancelled owing to the COVID-19 pandemic.

The race was won by Australian rider Jay Vine of UAE Team Emirates.

== Teams ==
All eighteen UCI WorldTeams participated, with up to seven riders in each team.

UCI WorldTeams

- AG2R Citroën Team
- Alpecin–Deceuninck
- Arkéa–Samsic
- Astana Qazaqstan Team
- Bora–Hansgrohe
- Cofidis
- EF Education–EasyPost
- Groupama–FDJ
- INEOS Grenadiers
- Intermarché–Circus–Wanty
- Movistar Team
- Soudal–Quick-Step
- Team Bahrain Victorious
- Team DSM
- Team Jayco–AlUla
- Team Jumbo–Visma
- Trek–Segafredo
- UAE Team Emirates

UCI ProTeams

- Israel–Premier Tech

National Teams

- UniSA–Australia

== Route ==
Stage characteristics and winners
Stage	Date	Route	Distance	Type	Winner
P	17 January	Adelaide	5.5 km (3 mi)	Individual time trial	Alberto Bettiol (ITA)
1	18 January	Tanunda to Tanunda	149.9 km (93 mi)	Hilly stage	Phil Bauhaus (GER)
2	19 January	Brighton to Victor Harbor	154.8 km (96.2 mi)	Hilly stage	Rohan Dennis (AUS)
3	20 January	Norwood to Campbelltown	116.8 km (72.6 mi)	Flat stage	Pello Bilbao (ESP)
4	21 January	Port Willunga to Willunga Township	133.2 km (82.8 mi)	Flat stage	Bryan Coquard (FRA)
5	22 January	Unley to Mount Lofty	112.5 km (69.9 mi)	Hilly stage	Simon Yates (GBR)
Total			672.7 km (418.0 mi)		

== Stages ==
=== Prologue ===
17 January 2023 — Adelaide, 5.5 km (3 mi)

Prologue Result
Rank	Rider	Team	Time
1	Alberto Bettiol (ITA)	EF Education–EasyPost	6' 19"
2	Magnus Sheffield (USA)	INEOS Grenadiers	+ 8"
3	Julius Johansen (DEN)	Intermarché–Circus–Wanty	+ 10"
4	Kaden Groves (AUS)	Alpecin–Deceuninck	+ 11"
5	Samuel Gaze (NZL)	Alpecin–Deceuninck	+ 11"
6	Hugo Page (FRA)	Intermarché–Circus–Wanty	+ 12"
7	Marius Mayrhofer (GER)	Team DSM	+ 13"
8	Jannik Steimle (GER)	Soudal–Quick-Step	+ 13"
9	Jay Vine (AUS)	UAE Team Emirates	+ 14"
10	Michael Matthews (AUS)	Team Jayco–AlUla	+ 14"

General classification after Prologue
Rank	Rider	Team	Time
1	Alberto Bettiol (ITA)	EF Education–EasyPost	6' 19"
2	Magnus Sheffield (USA)	INEOS Grenadiers	+ 8"
3	Julius Johansen (DEN)	Intermarché–Circus–Wanty	+ 10"
4	Kaden Groves (AUS)	Alpecin–Deceuninck	+ 11"
5	Samuel Gaze (NZL)	Alpecin–Deceuninck	+ 11"
6	Hugo Page (FRA)	Intermarché–Circus–Wanty	+ 12"
7	Marius Mayrhofer (GER)	Team DSM	+ 13"
8	Jannik Steimle (GER)	Soudal–Quick-Step	+ 13"
9	Jay Vine (AUS)	UAE Team Emirates	+ 14"
10	Michael Matthews (AUS)	Team Jayco–AlUla	+ 14"

=== Stage 1 ===
18 January 2023 — Tanunda to Tanunda, 149.9 km (93 mi)

Stage 1 Result
Rank	Rider	Team	Time
1	Phil Bauhaus (GER)	Team Bahrain Victorious	3h 37' 35"
2	Caleb Ewan (AUS)	UniSA–Australia	+ 0"
3	Michael Matthews (AUS)	Team Jayco–AlUla	+ 0"
4	Alessandro Covi (ITA)	UAE Team Emirates	+ 0"
5	Paul Penhoët (FRA)	Groupama–FDJ	+ 0"
6	Emils Liepins (LAT)	Trek–Segafredo	+ 0"
7	Hugo Page (FRA)	Intermarché–Circus–Wanty	+ 0"
8	Hugo Hofstetter (FRA)	Arkéa–Samsic	+ 0"
9	Taj Jones (AUS)	Israel–Premier Tech	+ 0"
10	Gerben Thijssen (BEL)	Intermarché–Circus–Wanty	+ 0"

General classification after Stage 1
Rank	Rider	Team	Time
1	Alberto Bettiol (ITA)	EF Education–EasyPost	3h 43' 54"
2	Michael Matthews (AUS)	Team Jayco–AlUla	+ 6"
3	Magnus Sheffield (USA)	INEOS Grenadiers	+ 8"
4	Julius Johansen (DEN)	Intermarché–Circus–Wanty	+ 10"
5	Kaden Groves (AUS)	Alpecin–Deceuninck	+ 11"
6	Samuel Gaze (NZL)	Alpecin–Deceuninck	+ 11"
7	Hugo Page (FRA)	Intermarché–Circus–Wanty	+ 12"
8	Marius Mayrhofer (GER)	Team DSM	+ 13"
9	Corbin Strong (NZL)	Israel–Premier Tech	+ 13"
10	Jannik Steimle (GER)	Soudal–Quick-Step	+ 13"

=== Stage 2 ===
19 January 2023 — Brighton to Victor Harbor, 154.8 km (96.2 mi)

Stage 2 Result
Rank	Rider	Team	Time
1	Rohan Dennis (AUS)	Team Jumbo–Visma	4h 00' 40"
2	Jay Vine (AUS)	UAE Team Emirates	+ 2"
3	Mauro Schmid (SUI)	Soudal–Quick-Step	+ 2"
4	Simon Yates (GBR)	Team Jayco–AlUla	+ 2"
5	Jai Hindley (AUS)	Bora–Hansgrohe	+ 5"
6	Caleb Ewan (AUS)	UniSA–Australia	+ 11"
7	Emils Liepins (LAT)	Trek–Segafredo	+ 11"
8	Corbin Strong (NZL)	Israel–Premier Tech	+ 11"
9	Kaden Groves (AUS)	Alpecin–Deceuninck	+ 11"
10	Paul Penhoët (FRA)	Groupama–FDJ	+ 11"

General classification after Stage 2
Rank	Rider	Team	Time
1	Rohan Dennis (AUS)	Team Jumbo–Visma	7h 44' 41"
2	Jay Vine (AUS)	UAE Team Emirates	+ 3"
3	Magnus Sheffield (USA)	INEOS Grenadiers	+ 12"
4	Mauro Schmid (SUI)	Soudal–Quick-Step	+ 13"
5	Corbin Strong (NZL)	Israel–Premier Tech	+ 14"
6	Hugo Page (FRA)	Intermarché–Circus–Wanty	+ 14"
7	Kaden Groves (AUS)	Alpecin–Deceuninck	+ 15"
8	Marius Mayrhofer (GER)	Team DSM	+ 17"
9	Nikias Arndt (GER)	Team Bahrain Victorious	+ 19"
10	Miles Scotson (FRA)	Groupama–FDJ	+ 20"

=== Stage 3 ===
20 January 2023 — Norwood to Campbelltown, 116.8 km (72.6 mi)

Stage 3 Result
Rank	Rider	Team	Time
1	Pello Bilbao (ESP)	Team Bahrain Victorious	2h 48' 10"
2	Simon Yates (GBR)	Team Jayco–AlUla	+ 0"
3	Jay Vine (AUS)	UAE Team Emirates	+ 0"
4	Michael Matthews (AUS)	Team Jayco–AlUla	+ 28"
5	Sven Erik Bystrøm (NOR)	Intermarché–Circus–Wanty	+ 28"
6	Natnael Tesfatsion (ERI)	Trek–Segafredo	+ 28"
7	Antonio Tiberi (ITA)	Trek–Segafredo	+ 28"
8	Milan Vader (NED)	Team Jumbo–Visma	+ 28"
9	Ben O'Connor (AUS)	AG2R Citroën Team	+ 28"
10	Ethan Hayter (GBR)	INEOS Grenadiers	+ 28"

General classification after Stage 3
Rank	Rider	Team	Time
1	Jay Vine (AUS)	UAE Team Emirates	10h 32' 50"
2	Pello Bilbao (ESP)	Team Bahrain Victorious	+ 15"
3	Simon Yates (GBR)	Team Jayco–AlUla	+ 16"
4	Magnus Sheffield (USA)	INEOS Grenadiers	+ 45"
5	Mauro Schmid (SUI)	Soudal–Quick-Step	+ 46"
6	Ethan Hayter (GBR)	INEOS Grenadiers	+ 50"
7	Sven Erik Bystrøm (NOR)	Intermarché–Circus–Wanty	+ 54"
8	Antonio Tiberi (ITA)	Trek–Segafredo	+ 58"
9	Ben O'Connor (AUS)	AG2R Citroën Team	+ 1' 00"
10	Gorka Izagirre (ESP)	Movistar Team	+ 1' 01"

=== Stage 4 ===
21 January 2023 — Port Willunga to Willunga Township, 133.2 km (82.8 mi)

Stage 4 Result
Rank	Rider	Team	Time
1	Bryan Coquard (FRA)	Cofidis	2h 53' 41"
2	Alberto Bettiol (ITA)	EF Education–EasyPost	+ 0"
3	Hugo Page (FRA)	Intermarché–Circus–Wanty	+ 0"
4	Paul Penhoët (FRA)	Groupama–FDJ	+ 0"
5	Corbin Strong (NZL)	Israel–Premier Tech	+ 0"
6	Michael Matthews (AUS)	Team Jayco–AlUla	+ 0"
7	Dorian Godon (FRA)	AG2R Citroën Team	+ 0"
8	Marius Mayrhofer (GER)	Team DSM	+ 0"
9	Kim Heiduk (GER)	INEOS Grenadiers	+ 0"
10	Caleb Ewan (AUS)	UniSA–Australia	+ 0"

General classification after Stage 4
Rank	Rider	Team	Time
1	Jay Vine (AUS)	UAE Team Emirates	13h 26' 31"
2	Simon Yates (GBR)	Team Jayco–AlUla	+ 15"
3	Pello Bilbao (ESP)	Team Bahrain Victorious	+ 15"
4	Magnus Sheffield (USA)	INEOS Grenadiers	+ 45"
5	Mauro Schmid (SUI)	Soudal–Quick-Step	+ 46"
6	Ethan Hayter (GBR)	INEOS Grenadiers	+ 50"
7	Sven Erik Bystrøm (NOR)	Intermarché–Circus–Wanty	+ 54"
8	Hugo Page (FRA)	Intermarché–Circus–Wanty	+ 56"
9	Antonio Tiberi (ITA)	Trek–Segafredo	+ 58"
10	Ben O'Connor (AUS)	AG2R Citroën Team	+ 1' 00"

=== Stage 5 ===
22 January 2023 — Unley to Mount Lofty, 112.5 km (69.9 mi)

Stage 5 Result
Rank	Rider	Team	Time
1	Simon Yates (GBR)	Team Jayco–AlUla	2h 41' 16"
2	Jay Vine (AUS)	UAE Team Emirates	+ 0"
3	Ben O'Connor (AUS)	AG2R Citroën Team	+ 2"
4	Antonio Tiberi (ITA)	Trek–Segafredo	+ 3"
5	Sven Erik Bystrøm (NOR)	Intermarché–Circus–Wanty	+ 6"
6	Jai Hindley (AUS)	Bora–Hansgrohe	+ 6"
7	Pello Bilbao (ESP)	Team Bahrain Victorious	+ 6"
8	Giovanni Aleotti (ITA)	Bora–Hansgrohe	+ 6"
9	Magnus Sheffield (USA)	INEOS Grenadiers	+ 6"
10	Mauro Schmid (SUI)	Soudal–Quick-Step	+ 6"

General classification after Stage 5
Rank	Rider	Team	Time
1	Jay Vine (AUS)	UAE Team Emirates	16h 07' 41"
2	Simon Yates (GBR)	Team Jayco–AlUla	+ 11"
3	Pello Bilbao (ESP)	Team Bahrain Victorious	+ 27"
4	Magnus Sheffield (USA)	INEOS Grenadiers	+ 57"
5	Mauro Schmid (SUI)	Soudal–Quick-Step	+ 58"
6	Ben O'Connor (AUS)	AG2R Citroën Team	+ 1' 04"
7	Sven Erik Bystrøm (NOR)	Intermarché–Circus–Wanty	+ 1' 06"
8	Antonio Tiberi (ITA)	Trek–Segafredo	+ 1' 07"
9	Gorka Izagirre (ESP)	Movistar Team	+ 1' 13"
10	Bryan Coquard (FRA)	Cofidis	+ 1' 13"

== Classification leadership table ==
Classification leadership by stage
Stage	Winner	General classification	Mountains classification	Sprints classification	Young rider classification	Most competitive rider(s)	Team classification
P	Alberto Bettiol	Alberto Bettiol	Not awarded	Not awarded	Magnus Sheffield	Not awarded	Alpecin–Deceuninck
1	Phil Bauhaus	Alberto Bettiol	Luke Plapp	Phil Bauhaus	Magnus Sheffield	Nans Peters	Intermarché–Circus–Wanty
2	Rohan Dennis	Rohan Dennis	Jay Vine	Caleb Ewan	Magnus Sheffield	Manuele Boaro	Alpecin–Deceuninck
3	Pello Bilbao	Jay Vine	Jay Vine	Michael Matthews	Magnus Sheffield	Mikkel Frølich Honoré	UAE Team Emirates
4	Bryan Coquard	Jay Vine	Mikkel Frølich Honoré	Michael Matthews	Magnus Sheffield	Daryl Impey	UAE Team Emirates
5	Simon Yates	Jay Vine	Mikkel Frølich Honoré	Michael Matthews	Magnus Sheffield	Mattia Cattaneo	UAE Team Emirates
Final		Jay Vine	Mikkel Frølich Honoré	Michael Matthews	Magnus Sheffield	Not awarded	UAE Team Emirates

== Classification standings ==
Legend
Denotes the winner of the general classification	Denotes the winner of the mountains classification
Denotes the winner of the sprints classification	Denotes the winner of the young rider classification
Denotes the winner of the combativity award	

=== General classification ===
Final general classification (1–10)
Rank	Rider	Team	Time
1	Jay Vine (AUS)	UAE Team Emirates	16h 07' 41"
2	Simon Yates (GBR)	Team Jayco–AlUla	+ 11"
3	Pello Bilbao (ESP)	Team Bahrain Victorious	+ 27"
4	Magnus Sheffield (USA)	INEOS Grenadiers	+ 57"
5	Mauro Schmid (SUI)	Soudal–Quick-Step	+ 58"
6	Ben O'Connor (AUS)	AG2R Citroën Team	+ 1' 04"
7	Sven Erik Bystrøm (NOR)	Intermarché–Circus–Wanty	+ 1' 06"
8	Antonio Tiberi (ITA)	Trek–Segafredo	+ 1' 07"
9	Gorka Izagirre (ESP)	Movistar Team	+ 1' 13"
10	Bryan Coquard (FRA)	Cofidis	+ 1' 13"

=== Mountains classification ===
Final mountains classification (1–10)
Rank	Rider	Team	Points
1	Mikkel Frølich Honoré (DEN)	EF Education–EasyPost	21
2	Jay Vine (AUS)	UAE Team Emirates	20
3	Simon Yates (GBR)	Team Jayco–AlUla	18
4	Fabio Felline (ITA)	Astana Qazaqstan Team	11
5	Kim Heiduk (GER)	INEOS Grenadiers	10
6	Johan Jacobs (SUI)	Movistar Team	10
7	Luke Plapp (AUS)	INEOS Grenadiers	10
8	Alessandro Covi (ITA)	UAE Team Emirates	8
9	Matthew Dinham (AUS)	Team DSM	8
10	Dmitriy Gruzdev (KAZ)	Astana Qazaqstan Team	7

=== Sprints classification ===
Final sprints classification (1–10)
Rank	Rider	Team	Points
1	Michael Matthews (AUS)	Team Jayco–AlUla	61
2	Simon Yates (GBR)	Team Jayco–AlUla	57
3	Jay Vine (AUS)	UAE Team Emirates	57
4	Caleb Ewan (AUS)	UniSA–Australia	47
5	Paul Penhoët (FRA)	Groupama–FDJ	43
6	Hugo Page (FRA)	Intermarché–Circus–Wanty	40
7	Bryan Coquard (FRA)	Cofidis	37
8	Corbin Strong (NZL)	Israel–Premier Tech	34
9	Rohan Dennis (AUS)	Team Jumbo–Visma	30
10	Phil Bauhaus (GER)	Team Bahrain Victorious	30

=== Young rider classification ===
Final young rider classification (1–10)
Rank	Rider	Team	Time
1	Magnus Sheffield (USA)	INEOS Grenadiers	16h 08' 38"
2	Antonio Tiberi (ITA)	Trek–Segafredo	+ 10"
3	Hugo Page (FRA)	Intermarché–Circus–Wanty	+ 54"
4	Reuben Thompson (NZL)	Groupama–FDJ	+ 1' 32"
5	Alex Baudin (FRA)	AG2R Citroën Team	+ 1' 54"
6	Paul Penhoët (FRA)	Groupama–FDJ	+ 3' 24"
7	Iván Romeo (ESP)	Movistar Team	+ 6' 55"
8	Leo Hayter (GBR)	INEOS Grenadiers	+ 10' 14"
9	Alessandro Verre (ITA)	Arkéa–Samsic	+ 18' 59"
10	Finn Fisher-Black (NZL)	UAE Team Emirates	+ 24' 25"

=== Teams classification ===
Final team classification (1–10)
Rank	Team	Time
1	(United Arab Emirates) UAE Team Emirates	48h 25' 34"
2	(United States) Trek–Segafredo	+ 1' 24"
3	(France) Groupama–FDJ	+ 1' 41"
4	(France) AG2R Citroën Team	+ 3' 09"
5	(Belgium) Soudal–Quick-Step	+ 5' 02"
6	(Belgium) Intermarché–Circus–Wanty	+ 5' 30"
7	Israel–Premier Tech	+ 6' 27"
8	(United Kingdom) INEOS Grenadiers	+ 7' 06"
9	(Germany) Bora–Hansgrohe	+ 8' 21"
10	Team Bahrain Victorious	+ 8' 58"
