= UCI Cycling Esports World Championships =

Annual road bicycle racing competition

- Status: Active
- Genre: Online cycling
- Inaugurated: 2020
- Organiser: UCI

The UCI Cycling Esports World Championships is a world championships for online bicycle road racing organized by the Union Cycliste Internationale (UCI).

== History ==
The first edition was held on 9 December 2020, featuring a men's and women's event over a virtual 50 kilometer route with 483 meters of simulated elevation gain on the Zwift platform. The event featured strict anti-cheating protocols as well as 11 power ups that competitors could use during the race.

The 2022 UCI Cycling Esports World Championships took place on February 26, 2022, once again on Zwift. WTRL hosted several open Continental pre-qualifiers during November 2021 where the best were invited to join the invite only Continental Qualifiers.

From the 2024 edition, the UCI has decided to hold the championships on the MyWhoosh platform and organize the finals on-site in Abu Dhabi, UAE.

== Hosts ==
Year	Platform	World	Place
2020	Zwift	Watopia	virtual
2021	Event not held		
2022	Zwift	New York	virtual
2023	Zwift	Scotland	virtual
2024	MyWhoosh		(United Arab Emirates) Abu Dhabi
2025	MyWhoosh		(United Arab Emirates) Abu Dhabi
2026	MyWhoosh		(United Arab Emirates) Abu Dhabi

== Winners ==
=== Men ===
Championships	Gold	Silver	Bronze
2020	Jason Osborne (GER)	Anders Foldager (DEN)	Nicklas Amdi Pedersen (DEN)
2021	Event not held		
2022	Jay Vine (AUS)	Freddy Ovett (AUS)	Jason Osborne (GER)
2023	Bjørn Andreassen (DEN)	Jason Osborne (GER)	Marc Mäding (GER)
2024	Jason Osborne (GER)	Lionel Vujasin (BEL)	Kasper Borremans (FIN)
2025	Jason Osborne (GER)	Michał Kamiński (POL)	Lennert Teugels (BEL)

=== Women ===
Championships	Gold	Silver	Bronze
2020	Ashleigh Moolman-Pasio (RSA)	Sarah Gigante (AUS)	Cecilia Hansen (SWE)
2021	Event not held		
2022	Loes Adegeest (NED)	Cecilia Hansen (SWE)	Zoe Langham (GBR)
2023	Loes Adegeest (NED)	Zoe Langham (GBR)	Jacqueline Godbe (USA)
2024	Mary Kate McCarthy (NZL)	Gabriela Guerra (BRA)	Kathrin Fuhrer (SUI)
2025	Mary Kate McCarthy (NZL)	Gabriela Guerra (BRA)	Francesca Tommasi (ITA)

== All Medals ==
Updated after 2025 UCI Cycling Esports World Championships.

Rank	Nation	Gold	Silver	Bronze	Total
1	Germany	3	1	2	6
2	Netherlands	2	0	0	2
2	New Zealand	2	0	0	2
4	Australia	1	2	0	3
5	Denmark	1	1	1	3
6	South Africa	1	0	0	1
7	Brazil	0	2	0	2
8	Belgium	0	1	1	2
8	Great Britain	0	1	1	2
8	Sweden	0	1	1	2
11	Poland	0	1	0	1
12	Finland	0	0	1	1
12	Italy	0	0	1	1
12	Switzerland	0	0	1	1
12	United States	0	0	1	1
Totals (15 entries)		10	10	10	30
