= Loes Adegeest =

Dutch racing cyclist

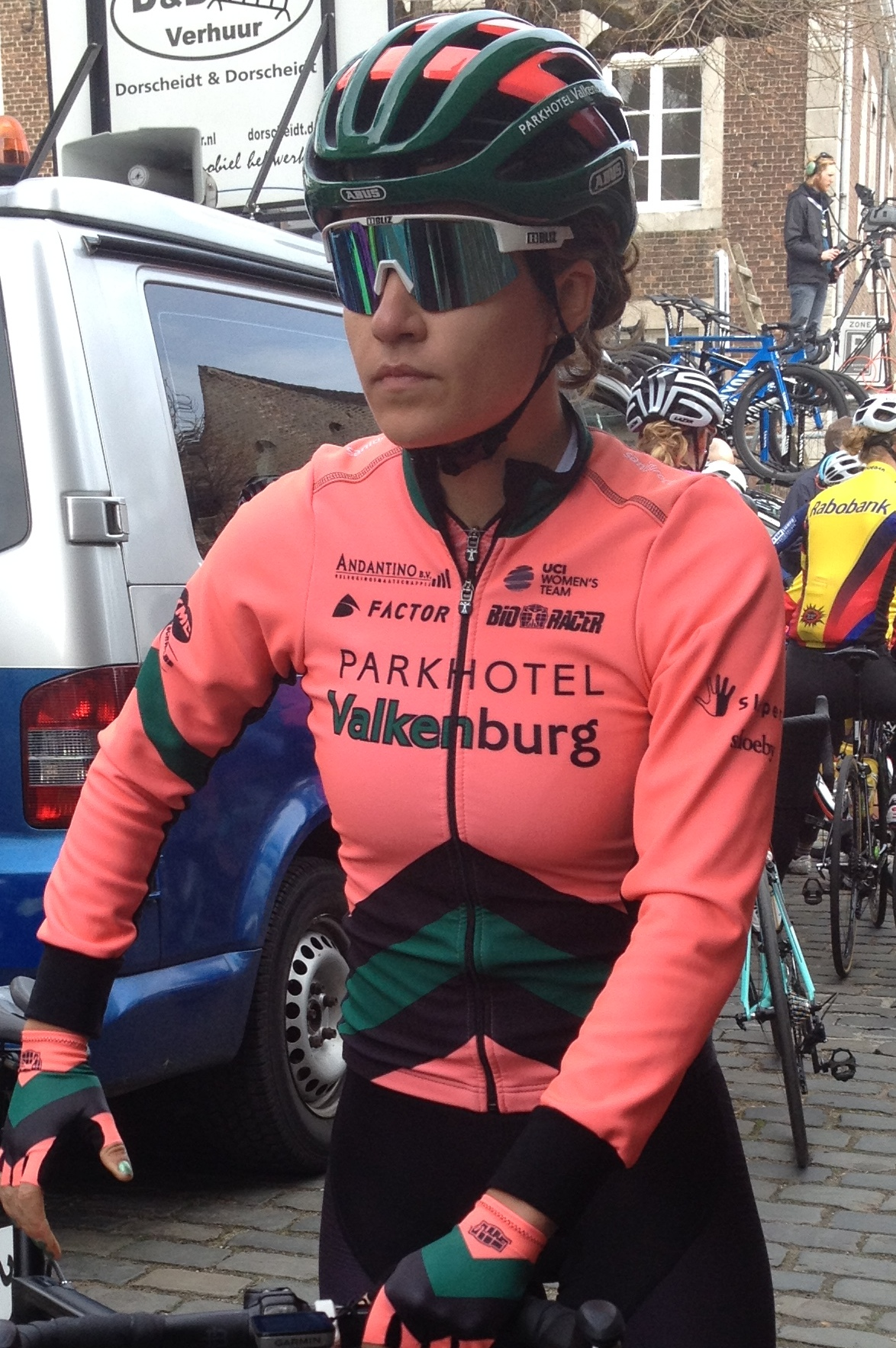
- Adegeest in 2019

Personal information
- Full name: Loes Adegeest
- Born: 7 August 1996 (age 30) Wageningen, Netherlands

Cycling career
- Sport: Cycling
- Current team: Lidl–Trek
- Discipline: Road
- Role: Rider

Amateur team
- 2020–2021: Jan van Arckel

Professional teams
- 2019: Parkhotel Valkenburg
- 2022: IBCT
- 2023–2025: FDJ–Suez
- 2026–: Lidl–Trek

Major wins
- One-day races and Classics Great Ocean Road Race (2023)
Medal record
Women's Cycling Esports
Representing Netherlands
World Championships
Gold medal – first place	2022 New York	Women's race
Gold medal – first place	2023 Glasgow	Women's race

Loes Adegeest (born 7 August 1996) is a Dutch racing cyclist and former speed skater. As a cyclist, she currently rides for Lidl–Trek, after previously riding for FDJ United–Suez, Irish IBCT team, and the Dutch amateur teams Jan van Arckel and Parkhotel Valkenburg. On 26 February 2022, Adegeest won the women's race at the 2022 UCI Cycling Esports World Championships representing e-racing team Aeonian Race Team. In January 2023 she won her first UCI Women's World Tour race, the Cadel Evans Great Ocean Road Race. In February 2023 she defended her title as the UCI Cycling Esports World Champion.

== Major results ==
2021
3rd Overall Rás na mBan

1st Stage 4

2022
1st UCI Esports World Championships
4th Time trial, National Road Championships
4th Dwars door het Hageland
5th Overall Belgium Tour

1st Mountains classification

2023
1st UCI Esports World Championships
1st Cadel Evans Great Ocean Road Race
1st Mountains classification, Tour de Romandie
8th Overall Itzulia Women
2024
Combativity award Stage 5 Tour de France
2025
1st Stage 3, Volta Ciclista a Catalunya Femenina
2026
3rd Stage 4, Tour de Suisse Women
Combativity award Stage 8 Tour de France
