= Nick Ovett =

British luger (born 1967)

Personal information
- Nationality: British
- Born: 4 January 1967 (age 59) Brighton, England

Sport
- Sport: Luge

Nick Ovett (born 4 January 1967) is a British luger. He competed at the 1988 Winter Olympics and the 1992 Winter Olympics. His brother, Steve, won a gold and bronze medal at the 1980 Summer Olympics. His nephew is professional racing cyclist Freddy Ovett.
