= Nicklas Amdi Pedersen =

Danish cyclist (born 1993)

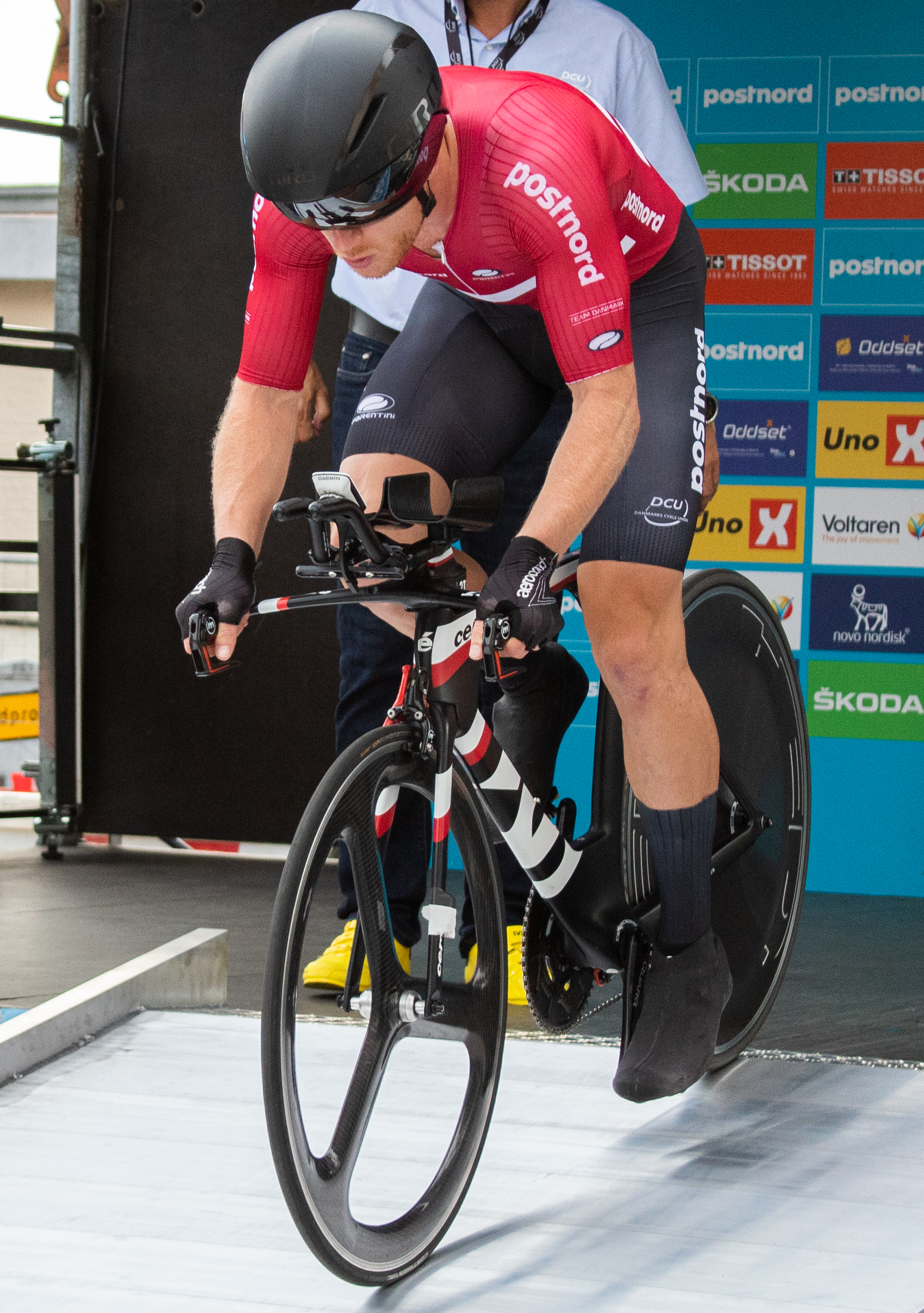
- Pedersen in 2022

Personal information
- Born: 3 August 1993 (age 33) Aarhus, Denmark

Cycling career
- Sport: Cycling
- Current team: Willing Able Racing
- Discipline: Road
- Role: Rider

Amateur teams
- 2004–2012: Cykle Klubben Aarhus
- 2013: Team ScaffCo Stilladser
- 2015: Team Jutlander Bank
- 2016: Team WeBike–CK Aarhus
- 2020–2021: Cykle Klubben Aarhus
- 2022: Team Bache–JS.dk
- 2025–: Willing Able Racing

Professional teams
- 2014: Team Designa Køkken–Knudsgaard
- 2017: Team Giant–Castelli
- 2018–2019: BHS–Almeborg Bornholm
- 2023: Team ColoQuick
- 2024: TDT–Unibet Cycling Team
Medal record
Men's cycling esports
Representing Denmark
World Championships
Bronze medal – third place	2020 Watopia	Men's race

Nicklas Amdi Pedersen (born 3 August 1993) is a Danish cyclist, who currently rides for club team Willing Able Racing.

== Major results ==
2013
7th Himmerland Rundt
2016
7th GP Horsens
10th Fyen Rundt
2017
2nd Tobago Cycling Classic
3rd Himmerland Rundt
6th Scandinavian Race in Uppsala
8th Overall Tour du Loir-et-Cher
2018
2nd Scandinavian Race in Uppsala
3rd Himmerland Rundt
2019
2nd Fyen Rundt
2nd Grand Prix Herning
6th Scandinavian Race in Uppsala
7th Kalmar Grand Prix
2020
3rd UCI Esports World Championships
2022
3rd Overall Randers Bike Week

1st Stage 3

5th Fyen Rundt
9th Grand Prix Herning
2023
1st Mountains classification, Danmark Rundt
2nd Fyen Rundt
4th Overall Tour d'Eure-et-Loir
4th Rutland–Melton CiCLE Classic
UCI Gravel World Series

6th Blaavands Huk

7th Antwerp Port Epic
8th Overall Tour du Loir-et-Cher
2024
1st Ster van Zwolle
