= Abi Smith =

English cyclist

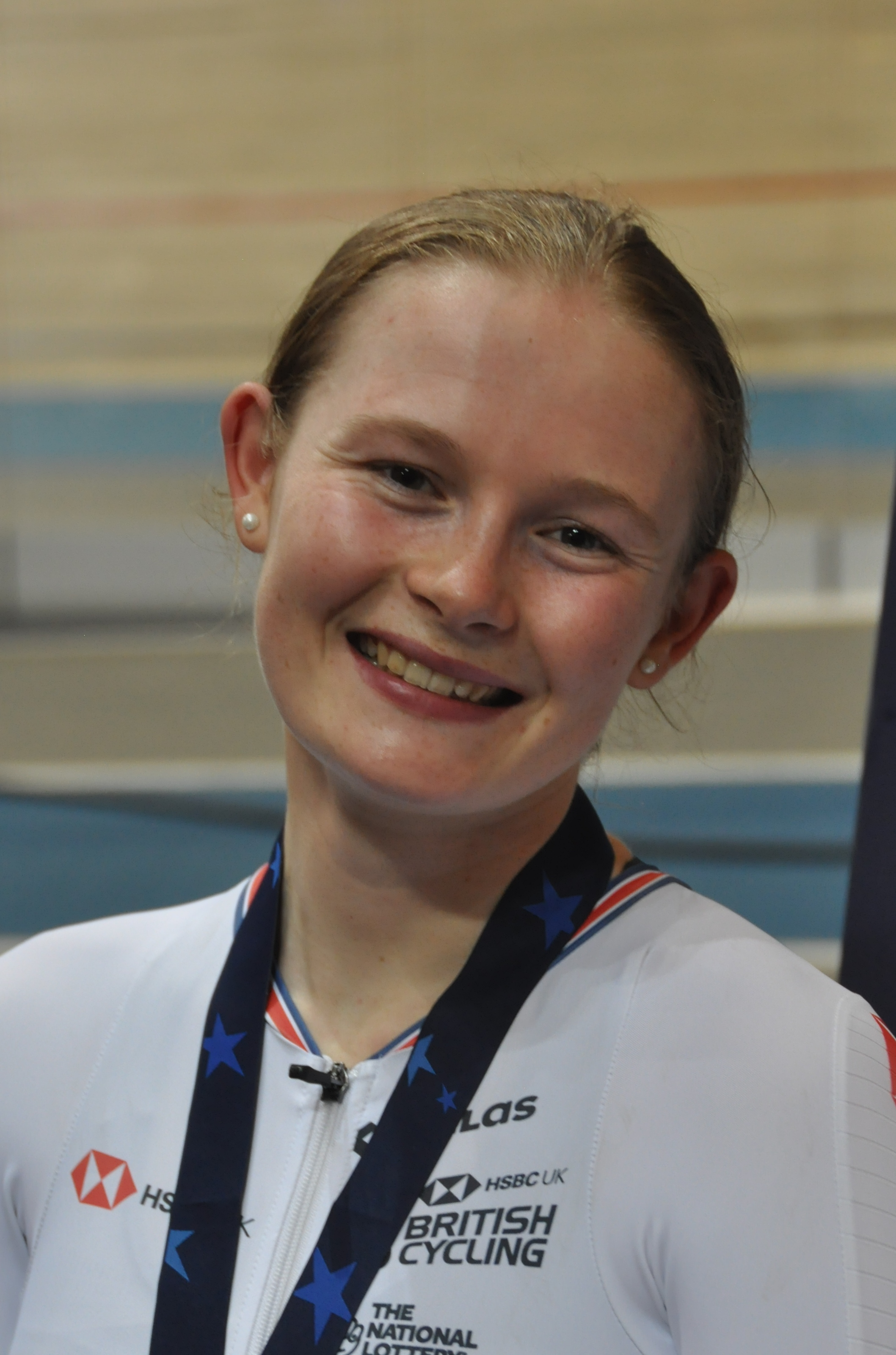
- Smith in 2021

Personal information
- Born: 1 April 2002 (age 24) Edinburgh, Scotland
- Height: 1.75 m (5 ft 9 in)

Cycling career
- Sport: Cycling
- Current team: Team Picnic–PostNL
- Disciplines: Road, gravel
- Role: Rider

Amateur teams
- 2020: Velo Performance Racing
- 2018: Clifton Cycling Club

Professional teams
- 2021–2023: Tibco–Silicon Valley Bank
- 2024–2025: Team dsm–firmenich PostNL
- 2026: Ribble Outliers (gravel)

Abi Smith (born 1 April 2002) is a Scottish-born English international cyclist. She has represented England at the Commonwealth Games.

== Biography ==
Smith, originally a triathlete was first selected for the GB cycling team in 2018. She joined EF Education-TIBCO-SVB from Clifton Cycling Club. From 2024 to 2025 Smith was with Team Picnic–PostNL.

In 2026, she joined Ribble Outliers, a UK-based professional team, as she changes discipline to gravel cycling after four years in road cycling.

In 2022, she was selected for the 2022 Commonwealth Games in Birmingham. She competed in the women's road race and the women's road time trial.

== Major results ==
2019
6th Overall Watersley Ladies Challenge
2020
3rd Time trial, National Under-23 Road Championships
2023
10th Overall Women's Tour Down Under
