= Anders Foldager =

Danish cyclist

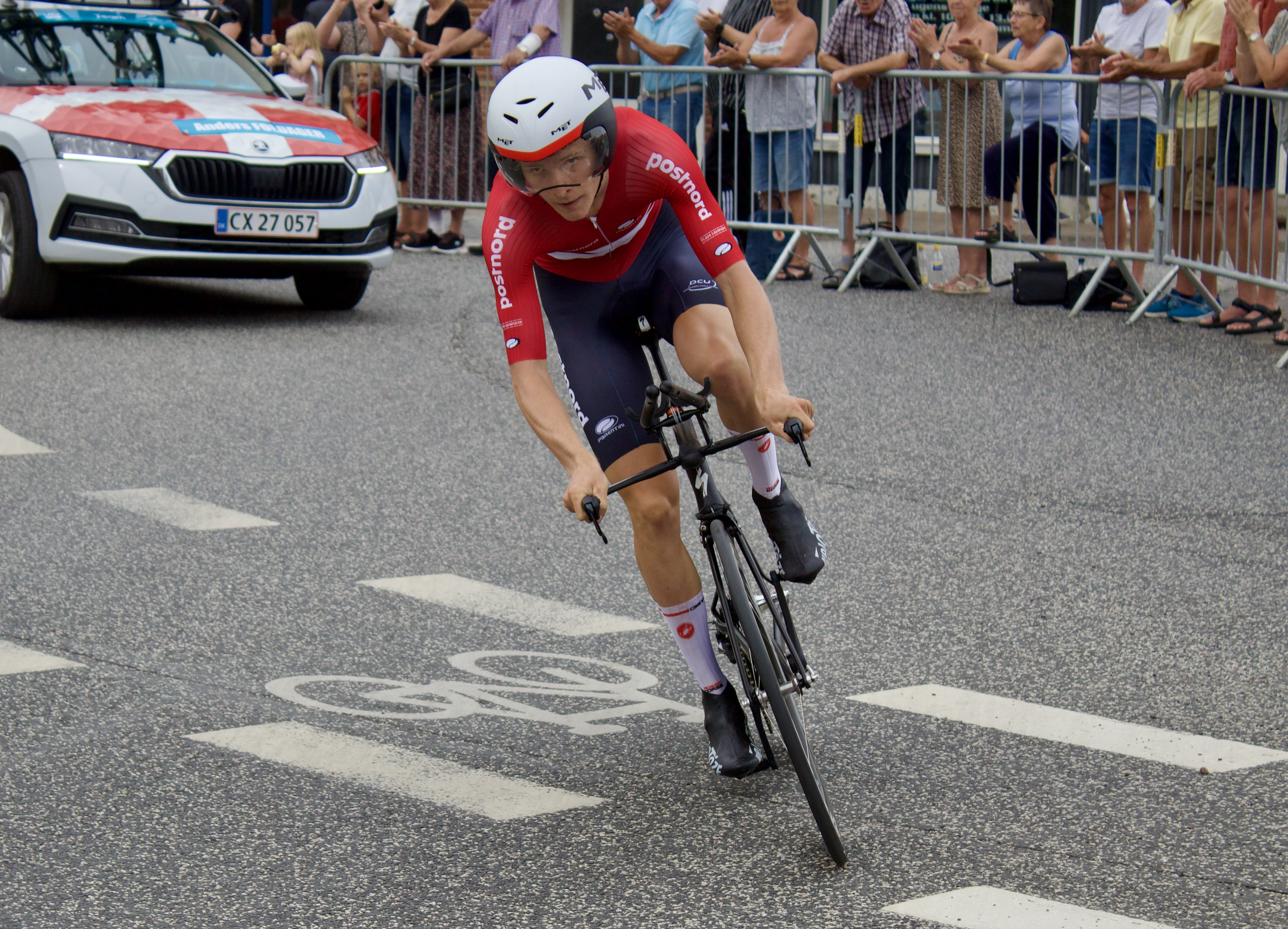
- Foldager at the 2022 Danmark Rundt

Personal information
- Born: 27 July 2001 (age 25) Skive, Denmark
- Height: 1.81 m (5 ft 11 in)
- Weight: 66 kg (146 lb)

Cycling career
- Sport: Cycling
- Current team: Team Jayco–AlUla
- Discipline: Road
- Role: Rider

Amateur teams
- 2012–2017: Hammel Cykle Klub
- 2018–2019: Team Mascot Workwear
- 2020–2021: Team Herning CK Elite

Professional teams
- 2022–2023: Biesse–Carrera
- 2022: Team BikeExchange–Jayco (stagiaire)
- 2024–: Team Jayco–AlUla

Major wins
- One-day races and Classics Brabantse Pijl (2026)
Medal record
Men's cycling esports
Representing Denmark
World Championships
Silver medal – second place	2020 Watopia	Men's race

Anders Foldager (born 27 July 2001) is a Danish cyclist, who currently rides for UCI WorldTeam Team Jayco–AlUla.

== Career ==
In 2023, Foldager won the first stage of the Tour de l'Avenir after getting into the day's breakaway. Later in the year, it was announced that he would be joining Team Jayco-AlUla for the 2024 season. In June 2024, he won the second stage of the Tour de Slovakia, attacking from a three-man breakaway to secure the win and also the lead in the General Classification.

Foldager took part in the 2025 Vuelta a España, finishing in 147th place overall.

== Major results ==
2020
2nd UCI Esports World Championships
2022
2nd Ruota d'Oro
3rd Trofeo Alcide Degasperi
4th Coppa Zappi
5th Giro del Belvedere
6th Trofeo Città di San Vendemiano
2023
1st Trofeo Città di San Vendemiano
1st Memorial Polese
Tour de l'Avenir

1st Stages 1 & 3 (TTT)

1st Stage 8 Giro Next Gen
3rd Per sempre Alfredo
7th Giro del Belvedere
2024 (1 pro win)
3rd Overall Danmark Rundt
3rd Coppa Sabatini
4th Overall Okolo Slovenska

1st Stages 1 (TTT) & 2

5th Grand Prix of Aargau Canton
6th Overall CRO Race
2025
5th Overall Tour de Wallonie
2026 (1)
1st Brabantse Pijl
2nd Road race, National Road Championships
2nd Circuit Franco-Belge
4th NXT Classic
5th Overall Tour de Wallonie

=== Grand Tour general classification results timeline ===
Grand Tour	2025
Giro d'Italia	—
Tour de France	—
Vuelta a España	147

Legend
—	Did not compete
DNF	Did not finish
