= Freddy Ovett =

British-born Australian cyclist (born 1994)

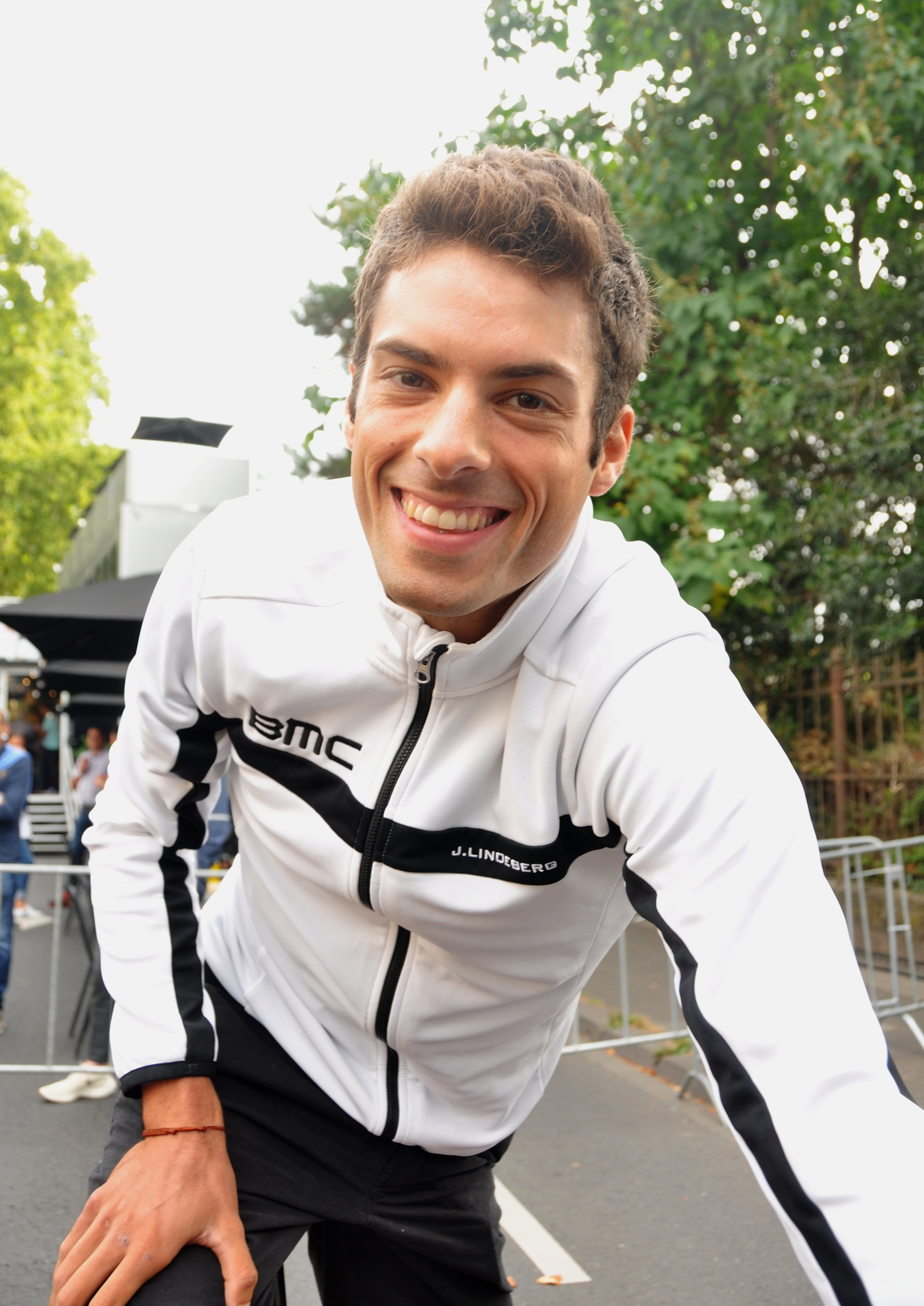
- Ovett at the 2018 Deutschland Tour

Personal information
- Full name: Freddy Ovett
- Born: 16 January 1994 (age 32) Dumfries, Scotland
- Height: 1.85 m (6 ft 1 in)
- Weight: 66 kg (146 lb)

Cycling career
- Sport: Cycling
- Disciplines: Road; Gravel
- Role: Rider

Amateur teams
- 2014: Carnegie Caulfield CC
- 2015: Chambéry CF
- 2017: Caja Rural–Seguros RGA Amateur

Professional teams
- 2016: SEG Racing Academy
- 2018–2019: ACA–Ride Sunshine Coast
- 2018: BMC Racing Team (stagiaire)
- 2019: Israel Cycling Academy (stagiaire)
- 2020: Israel Cycling Academy
- 2021–2022: L39ION of Los Angeles
Medal record
Men's Cycling Esports
Representing Australia
World Championships
| Silver medal – second place | 2022 New York | Men's race |

Freddy Ovett (born 16 January 1994) is a British-born Australian professional off-road cyclist. He has previously been a stagiaire with UCI WorldTeam BMC Racing Team in 2018, and UCI Professional Continental team Israel Cycling Academy in 2019.

== Personal life ==
Ovett was born in Dumfries, Scotland. His parents at the time lived nearby for 10 years at Kinmouth House in Annan where they ran a holiday and sporting breaks business. His father, Steve Ovett, competed for Great Britain in middle-distance running during the 1970s and the 1980s, winning gold at the 1980 Summer Olympics in the 800 metres, and the 1986 Commonwealth Games in the 5000 metres.

Ovett himself also competed as a runner before cycling and still occasionally does, having completed the 2023 New York Marathon in a time of 2:37:08 and the Sant Silvestre de Girona 5k in 14:41.

His uncle, Nick Ovett, competed for Great Britain in the luge at the 1988 and 1992 Winter Olympics.

== Major results ==
2018
2nd Tour de Okinawa
7th Overall Tour de Tochigi
10th Overall Herald Sun Tour
2019
9th Overall Tour de Langkawi
2020
8th UCI Esports World Championships
2022
2nd UCI Esports World Championships
