= Swedish Cycling Federation =

National governing body of cycle racing in Sweden

SCF logo

The Swedish Cycling Federation or SCF (in Swedish: Svenska Cykelförbundet) was established in 1900, and is the national governing body of cycle racing in Sweden.

The SCF is a member of the UCI and the UEC.
