= Zaaf Cycling Team =

Former Spanish cycling team

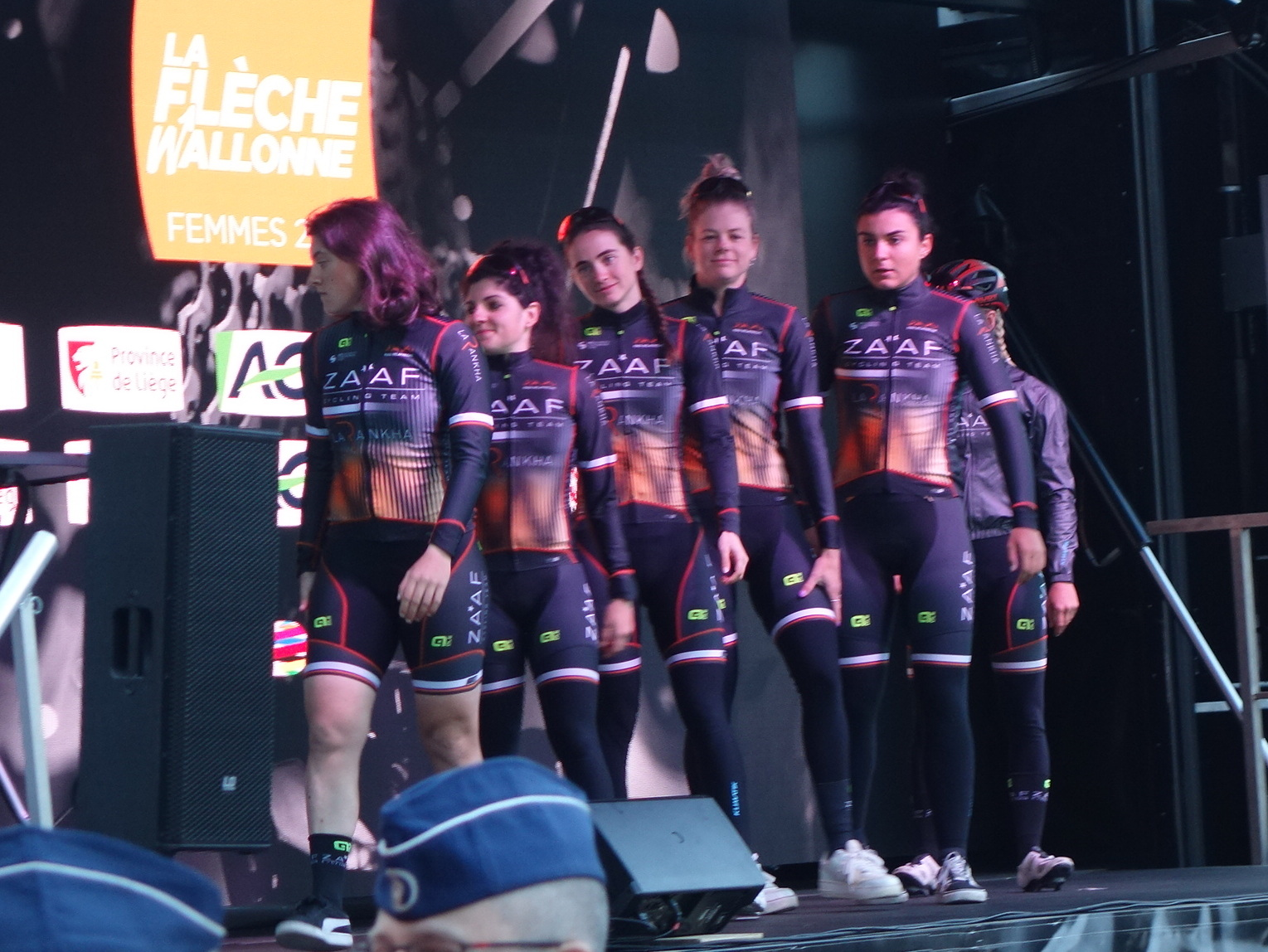
- Team Zaaf before start of the Walloon Arrow on the Grand Place in Huy, 2023.

Team information
- UCI code: ZAF (2023)
- Registered: Spain
- Founded: 2022
- Disbanded: 2023
- Discipline: Road
- Status: Club (2022)

Key personnel
- Team managers: Manel Lacambra, Ladi Demko

Team name history
- 2022–2023: Zaaf Cycling Team

Zaaf Cycling Team was a Spanish women's road cycling team that was founded in 2022. Following allegations of unpaid wages, the Union Cycliste Internationale (UCI) revoked its licence in April 2023.

== History ==
The team was named after Abdel-Kader Zaaf, an Algerian rider who competed in several editions in the Tour de France in the 1940s and 1950s.

Racing as a club team in 2022, it became a UCI Women's Continental Team in 2023. Zaaf Cycling Team signed riders that had previously signed with the French team B&B Hotels–KTM, which was in the process of creating a women's team when it suddenly folded in December 2022. This included French national champion Audrey Cordon-Ragot and Canadian national champion Maggie Coles-Lyster.

=== Allegations of unpaid wages ===
In March 2023, the UCI placed the team under investigation following allegations that riders and staff had not been paid. Media reports noted that some riders wished to protest at Gent–Wevelgem by not starting the race, and that riders were being assisted by The Cyclists' Alliance, the union of the professional women's peloton.

In early April 2023, the UCI subsequently allowed riders to move teams, following the resignation of Audrey Cordon-Ragot due to unpaid wages. L'Équipe reported that the team had missed out on an invitation to Tour de France Femmes, with race director Marion Rousse stating “we couldn’t condone having a team at the start that didn’t pay its girls”.

By the end of April, it was reported that over eight riders had quit, with the team having only the minimum number for a UCI Women's Continental Team. Other media reports included allegations that the team had been short staffed as well as lacking bikes and other equipment. On 26 April, the team withdrew their entry from La Vuelta Femenina.

On April 28, 2023, the licence that allows the team to operate was revoked by the UCI as only seven riders remained on their roster.
