= 2021 Tour of Belgium =

2021 UCI Europe Tour 2021 UCI ProSeries

Race details
- Dates: 9–13 June 2021
- Stages: 5
- Distance: 692.3 km (430.2 mi)
- Winning time: 15h 41' 59"

Results
| Jersey awarded to the overall winner | Winner | Remco Evenepoel (BEL) | (Deceuninck–Quick-Step) |
| | Second | Yves Lampaert (BEL) | (Deceuninck–Quick-Step) |
| | Third | Gianni Marchand (BEL) | (Tarteletto–Isorex) |
| Jersey awarded to the points classification winner | Points | Caleb Ewan (AUS) | (Lotto–Soudal) |
| Jersey awarded to the combativity classification winner | Combativity | Cédric Beullens (BEL) | (Sport Vlaanderen–Baloise) |
| | Team | Team Jumbo–Visma | |

The 2021 Tour of Belgium (known as the 2021 Baloise Belgium Tour for sponsorship purposes) was the 90th edition of the Tour of Belgium road cycling stage race, which took place from 9 to 13 June 2021. The category 2.Pro event formed a part of the 2021 UCI Europe Tour and the 2021 UCI ProSeries. After being upgraded from a category 2.HC event after the 2019 season, the race was set to feature in the inaugural edition of the UCI ProSeries, but after the cancellation of the 2020 edition, this edition was its UCI ProSeries debut.

== Teams ==
Eight of the nineteen UCI WorldTeams, nine UCI ProTeams, and four UCI Continental teams made up the twenty-one teams that participated in the race. UCI WorldTeam Israel Start-Up Nation were originally invited, but they withdrew due to a COVID-19 outbreak among their staff members. Trek–Segafredo, with six riders, was the only team to not field a full squad of seven riders. Of the 146 riders who started the race, 137 finished.

UCI WorldTeams

- Bora–Hansgrohe
- Deceuninck–Quick-Step
- Intermarché–Wanty–Gobert Matériaux
- ~~Israel Start-Up Nation~~ (Withdrawn)
- Lotto–Soudal
- Team DSM
- Team Jumbo–Visma
- Team Qhubeka Assos
- Trek–Segafredo

UCI ProTeams

- Alpecin–Fenix
- Arkéa–Samsic
- B&B Hotels p/b KTM
- Bardiani–CSF–Faizanè
- Bingoal Pauwels Sauces WB
- Sport Vlaanderen–Baloise
- Team Novo Nordisk
- Total Direct Énergie
- Vini Zabù

UCI Continental Teams

- Baloise–Trek Lions
- BEAT Cycling
- Pauwels Sauzen–Bingoal
- Tarteletto–Isorex

== Route ==
Stage characteristics and winners
| Stage | Date | Course | Distance | Type | Stage winner |
|---|---|---|---|---|---|
| 1 | 9 June | Beveren to Maarkedal | 175.3 km (108.9 mi) | Flat stage | Robbe Ghys (BEL) |
| 2 | 10 June | Knokke-Heist to Knokke-Heist | 11.2 km (7.0 mi) | Individual time trial | Remco Evenepoel (BEL) |
| 3 | 11 June | Gingelom to Scherpenheuvel-Zichem | 174.4 km (108.4 mi) | Flat stage | Caleb Ewan (AUS) |
| 4 | 12 June | Hamoir to Hamoir | 152.7 km (94.9 mi) | Hilly stage | Caleb Ewan (AUS) |
| 5 | 13 June | Turnhout to Beringen | 178.7 km (111.0 mi) | Flat stage | Mark Cavendish (GBR) |
| Total | | | 692.3 km (430.2 mi) | | |

== Stages ==
=== Stage 1 ===
9 June 2021 — Beveren to Maarkedal, 175.3 km (108.9 mi)

Stage 1 Result
| Rank | Rider | Team | Time |
|---|---|---|---|
| 1 | Robbe Ghys (BEL) | Sport Vlaanderen–Baloise | 4h 05' 15" |
| 2 | Remco Evenepoel (BEL) | Deceuninck–Quick-Step | + 0" |
| 3 | Gianni Marchand (BEL) | Tarteletto–Isorex | + 0" |
| 4 | Jasper Philipsen (BEL) | Alpecin–Fenix | + 28" |
| 5 | Jasper De Buyst (BEL) | Lotto–Soudal | + 28" |
| 6 | Toon Aerts (BEL) | Baloise–Trek Lions | + 28" |
| 7 | Ide Schelling (NED) | Bora–Hansgrohe | + 28" |
| 8 | Boy van Poppel (NED) | Intermarché–Wanty–Gobert Matériaux | + 28" |
| 9 | Bryan Coquard (FRA) | B&B Hotels p/b KTM | + 28" |
| 10 | Pascal Eenkhoorn (NED) | Team Jumbo–Visma | + 28" |

General classification after Stage 1
| Rank | Rider | Team | Time |
|---|---|---|---|
| 1 | Remco Evenepoel (BEL) | Deceuninck–Quick-Step | 4h 05' 00" |
| 2 | Robbe Ghys (BEL) | Sport Vlaanderen–Baloise | + 5" |
| 3 | Gianni Marchand (BEL) | Tarteletto–Isorex | + 8" |
| 4 | Dimitri Claeys (BEL) | Team Qhubeka Assos | + 41" |
| 5 | Jasper Philipsen (BEL) | Alpecin–Fenix | + 43" |
| 6 | Jasper De Buyst (BEL) | Lotto–Soudal | + 43" |
| 7 | Toon Aerts (BEL) | Baloise–Trek Lions | + 43" |
| 8 | Ide Schelling (NED) | Bora–Hansgrohe | + 43" |
| 9 | Boy van Poppel (NED) | Intermarché–Wanty–Gobert Matériaux | + 43" |
| 10 | Bryan Coquard (FRA) | B&B Hotels p/b KTM | + 43" |

=== Stage 2 ===
10 June 2021 — Knokke-Heist to Knokke-Heist, 11.2 km (7.0 mi) (ITT)

Stage 2 Result
| Rank | Rider | Team | Time |
|---|---|---|---|
| 1 | Remco Evenepoel (BEL) | Deceuninck–Quick-Step | 12' 00" |
| 2 | Yves Lampaert (BEL) | Deceuninck–Quick-Step | + 2" |
| 3 | Finn Fisher-Black (NZL) | Team Jumbo–Visma | + 18" |
| 4 | Rune Herregodts (BEL) | Alpecin–Fenix | + 19" |
| 5 | Frederik Frison (BEL) | Lotto–Soudal | + 19" |
| 6 | Thibault Guernalec (FRA) | Arkéa–Samsic | + 21" |
| 7 | Lasse Norman Hansen (DEN) | Team Qhubeka Assos | + 21" |
| 8 | Koen Bouwman (NED) | Team Jumbo–Visma | + 24" |
| 9 | Davide Ballerini (ITA) | Deceuninck–Quick-Step | + 25" |
| 10 | Connor Swift (GBR) | Arkéa–Samsic | + 26" |

General classification after Stage 2
| Rank | Rider | Team | Time |
|---|---|---|---|
| 1 | Remco Evenepoel (BEL) | Deceuninck–Quick-Step | 4h 17' 00" |
| 2 | Yves Lampaert (BEL) | Deceuninck–Quick-Step | + 45" |
| 3 | Gianni Marchand (BEL) | Tarteletto–Isorex | + 53" |
| 4 | Finn Fisher-Black (NZL) | Team Jumbo–Visma | + 1' 01" |
| 5 | Koen Bouwman (NED) | Team Jumbo–Visma | + 1' 07" |
| 6 | Connor Swift (GBR) | Arkéa–Samsic | + 1' 09" |
| 7 | Ide Schelling (NED) | Bora–Hansgrohe | + 1' 10" |
| 8 | Oscar Riesebeek (NED) | Alpecin–Fenix | + 1' 10" |
| 9 | Pascal Eenkhoorn (NED) | Team Jumbo–Visma | + 1' 10" |
| 10 | Toon Aerts (BEL) | Baloise–Trek Lions | + 1' 15" |

=== Stage 3 ===
11 June 2021 — Gingelom to Scherpenheuvel-Zichem, 174.4 km (108.4 mi)

Stage 3 Result
| Rank | Rider | Team | Time |
|---|---|---|---|
| 1 | Caleb Ewan (AUS) | Lotto–Soudal | 3h 56' 43" |
| 2 | Michael Mørkøv (DEN) | Deceuninck–Quick-Step | + 0" |
| 3 | Danny van Poppel (NED) | Intermarché–Wanty–Gobert Matériaux | + 0" |
| 4 | Matteo Moschetti (ITA) | Trek–Segafredo | + 0" |
| 5 | Timothy Dupont (BEL) | Bingoal Pauwels Sauces WB | + 0" |
| 6 | Olav Kooij (NED) | Team Jumbo–Visma | + 0" |
| 7 | Bryan Coquard (FRA) | B&B Hotels p/b KTM | + 0" |
| 8 | Thibau Nys (BEL) | Baloise–Trek Lions | + 0" |
| 9 | Nils Eekhoff (NED) | Team DSM | + 0" |
| 10 | Niccolò Bonifazio (ITA) | Total Direct Énergie | + 0" |

General classification after Stage 3
| Rank | Rider | Team | Time |
|---|---|---|---|
| 1 | Remco Evenepoel (BEL) | Deceuninck–Quick-Step | 8h 13' 43" |
| 2 | Yves Lampaert (BEL) | Deceuninck–Quick-Step | + 45" |
| 3 | Gianni Marchand (BEL) | Tarteletto–Isorex | + 53" |
| 4 | Finn Fisher-Black (NZL) | Team Jumbo–Visma | + 1' 01" |
| 5 | Koen Bouwman (NED) | Team Jumbo–Visma | + 1' 07" |
| 6 | Connor Swift (GBR) | Arkéa–Samsic | + 1' 09" |
| 7 | Ide Schelling (NED) | Bora–Hansgrohe | + 1' 10" |
| 8 | Oscar Riesebeek (NED) | Alpecin–Fenix | + 1' 10" |
| 9 | Pascal Eenkhoorn (NED) | Team Jumbo–Visma | + 1' 10" |
| 10 | Toon Aerts (BEL) | Baloise–Trek Lions | + 1' 15" |

=== Stage 4 ===
12 June 2021 — Hamoir to Hamoir, 152.7 km (94.9 mi)

Stage 4 Result
| Rank | Rider | Team | Time |
|---|---|---|---|
| 1 | Caleb Ewan (AUS) | Lotto–Soudal | 3h 37' 48" |
| 2 | Bryan Coquard (FRA) | B&B Hotels p/b KTM | + 0" |
| 3 | Davide Ballerini (ITA) | Deceuninck–Quick-Step | + 0" |
| 4 | Giacomo Nizzolo (ITA) | Team Qhubeka Assos | + 0" |
| 5 | Jasper De Buyst (BEL) | Lotto–Soudal | + 0" |
| 6 | Ide Schelling (NED) | Bora–Hansgrohe | + 0" |
| 7 | Loïc Vliegen (BEL) | Intermarché–Wanty–Gobert Matériaux | + 0" |
| 8 | Filippo Fiorelli (ITA) | Bardiani–CSF–Faizanè | + 0" |
| 9 | Arjen Livyns (BEL) | Bingoal Pauwels Sauces WB | + 0" |
| 10 | Cyril Barthe (FRA) | B&B Hotels p/b KTM | + 0" |

General classification after Stage 4
| Rank | Rider | Team | Time |
|---|---|---|---|
| 1 | Remco Evenepoel (BEL) | Deceuninck–Quick-Step | 11h 51' 32" |
| 2 | Yves Lampaert (BEL) | Deceuninck–Quick-Step | + 45" |
| 3 | Gianni Marchand (BEL) | Tarteletto–Isorex | + 53" |
| 4 | Finn Fisher-Black (NZL) | Team Jumbo–Visma | + 1' 01" |
| 5 | Koen Bouwman (NED) | Team Jumbo–Visma | + 1' 07" |
| 6 | Connor Swift (GBR) | Arkéa–Samsic | + 1' 09" |
| 7 | Ide Schelling (NED) | Bora–Hansgrohe | + 1' 10" |
| 8 | Oscar Riesebeek (NED) | Alpecin–Fenix | + 1' 10" |
| 9 | Toon Aerts (BEL) | Baloise–Trek Lions | + 1' 15" |
| 10 | Jasper De Buyst (BEL) | Lotto–Soudal | + 1' 15" |

=== Stage 5 ===
13 June 2021 — Turnhout to Beringen, 178.7 km (111.0 mi)

Stage 5 Result
| Rank | Rider | Team | Time |
|---|---|---|---|
| 1 | Mark Cavendish (GBR) | Deceuninck–Quick-Step | 3h 50' 31" |
| 2 | Tim Merlier (BEL) | Alpecin–Fenix | + 0" |
| 3 | Pascal Ackermann (GER) | Bora–Hansgrohe | + 0" |
| 4 | Dylan Groenewegen (NED) | Team Jumbo–Visma | + 0" |
| 5 | Nacer Bouhanni (FRA) | Arkéa–Samsic | + 0" |
| 6 | Bryan Coquard (FRA) | B&B Hotels p/b KTM | + 0" |
| 7 | Sasha Weemaes (BEL) | Bingoal Pauwels Sauces WB | + 0" |
| 8 | Niccolò Bonifazio (ITA) | Total Direct Énergie | + 0" |
| 9 | Caleb Ewan (AUS) | Lotto–Soudal | + 0" |
| 10 | Danny van Poppel (NED) | Intermarché–Wanty–Gobert Matériaux | + 0" |

General classification after Stage 5
| Rank | Rider | Team | Time |
|---|---|---|---|
| 1 | Remco Evenepoel (BEL) | Deceuninck–Quick-Step | 15h 41' 59" |
| 2 | Yves Lampaert (BEL) | Deceuninck–Quick-Step | + 46" |
| 3 | Gianni Marchand (BEL) | Tarteletto–Isorex | + 56" |
| 4 | Finn Fisher-Black (NZL) | Team Jumbo–Visma | + 1' 04" |
| 5 | Ide Schelling (NED) | Bora–Hansgrohe | + 1' 08" |
| 6 | Koen Bouwman (NED) | Team Jumbo–Visma | + 1' 08" |
| 7 | Connor Swift (GBR) | Arkéa–Samsic | + 1' 12" |
| 8 | Oscar Riesebeek (NED) | Alpecin–Fenix | + 1' 13" |
| 9 | Toon Aerts (BEL) | Baloise–Trek Lions | + 1' 13" |
| 10 | Jasper De Buyst (BEL) | Lotto–Soudal | + 1' 18" |

== Classification leadership table ==
Classification leadership by stage
| Stage | Winner | General classification (Dutch: Algemeenklassement) | Points classification (Dutch: Puntenklassement) | Combativity classification (Dutch: Strijdlustklassement) | Team classification (Dutch: Ploegenklassement) |
|---|---|---|---|---|---|
| 1 | Robbe Ghys | Remco Evenepoel | Robbe Ghys | Robbe Ghys | Sport Vlaanderen–Baloise |
| 2 | Remco Evenepoel | Remco Evenepoel | Remco Evenepoel | Robbe Ghys | Team Jumbo–Visma |
| 3 | Caleb Ewan | Remco Evenepoel | Remco Evenepoel | Jan-Willem van Schip | Team Jumbo–Visma |
| 4 | Caleb Ewan | Remco Evenepoel | Caleb Ewan | Cédric Beullens | Team Jumbo–Visma |
| 5 | Mark Cavendish | Remco Evenepoel | Caleb Ewan | Cédric Beullens | Team Jumbo–Visma |
| Final | | Remco Evenepoel | Caleb Ewan | Cédric Beullens | Team Jumbo–Visma |

- On stage 2, Jan-Willem van Schip, who was second in the combativity classification, wore the white jersey, because first placed Robbe Ghys wore the red jersey as the leader of the points classification.
- On stage 3, Gianni Marchand, who was third in the points classification, wore the red jersey, because first placed Remco Evenepoel wore the blue jersey as the leader of the general classification and second placed Robbe Ghys wore the white jersey as the leader of the combativity classification.
- After stage 3, Jan-Willem van Schip, who led the combativity classification, was disqualified by the UCI's technical committee for having a handlebar set-up in contravention of UCI technical regulations, overruling an early decision by commissaires that allowed van Schip to use such handlebars. As a result, on stage 4, Cédric Beullens, who is second in that classification, will wear the white jersey.
- On stage 4, Robbe Ghys, who was second in the points classification, wore the red jersey, because first placed Remco Evenepoel wore the blue jersey as the leader of the general classification.

== Final classification standings ==
Legend
| Denotes the winner of the general classification |
| Denotes the winner of the points classification |
| Denotes the winner of the combativity classification |

=== General classification ===
Final general classification (1–10)
| Rank | Rider | Team | Time |
|---|---|---|---|
| 1 | Remco Evenepoel (BEL) | Deceuninck–Quick-Step | 15h 41' 59" |
| 2 | Yves Lampaert (BEL) | Deceuninck–Quick-Step | + 46" |
| 3 | Gianni Marchand (BEL) | Tarteletto–Isorex | + 56" |
| 4 | Finn Fisher-Black (NZL) | Team Jumbo–Visma | + 1' 04" |
| 5 | Ide Schelling (NED) | Bora–Hansgrohe | + 1' 08" |
| 6 | Koen Bouwman (NED) | Team Jumbo–Visma | + 1' 08" |
| 7 | Connor Swift (GBR) | Arkéa–Samsic | + 1' 12" |
| 8 | Oscar Riesebeek (NED) | Alpecin–Fenix | + 1' 13" |
| 9 | Toon Aerts (BEL) | Baloise–Trek Lions | + 1' 13" |
| 10 | Jasper De Buyst (BEL) | Lotto–Soudal | + 1' 18" |

=== Points classification ===
Final points classification (1–10)
| Rank | Rider | Team | Points |
|---|---|---|---|
| 1 | Caleb Ewan (AUS) | Lotto–Soudal | 71 |
| 2 | Bryan Coquard (FRA) | B&B Hotels p/b KTM | 64 |
| 3 | Remco Evenepoel (BEL) | Deceuninck–Quick-Step | 45 |
| 4 | Jasper De Buyst (BEL) | Lotto–Soudal | 34 |
| 5 | Danny van Poppel (NED) | Intermarché–Wanty–Gobert Matériaux | 32 |
| 6 | Robbe Ghys (BEL) | Sport Vlaanderen–Baloise | 30 |
| 7 | Mark Cavendish (GBR) | Deceuninck–Quick-Step | 30 |
| 8 | Davide Ballerini (ITA) | Deceuninck–Quick-Step | 29 |
| 9 | Ide Schelling (NED) | Bora–Hansgrohe | 28 |
| 10 | Tim Merlier (BEL) | Alpecin–Fenix | 25 |

=== Combativity classification ===
Final combativity classification (1–10)
| Rank | Rider | Team | Points |
|---|---|---|---|
| 1 | Cédric Beullens (BEL) | Sport Vlaanderen–Baloise | 46 |
| 2 | Jonas Rickaert (BEL) | Alpecin–Fenix | 45 |
| 3 | Samuele Zoccarato (ITA) | Bardiani–CSF–Faizanè | 31 |
| 4 | Andreas Goeman (BEL) | Tarteletto–Isorex | 30 |
| 5 | Laurens Sweeck (BEL) | Pauwels Sauzen–Bingoal | 26 |
| 6 | Piotr Havik (NED) | BEAT Cycling | 24 |
| 7 | Taco van der Hoorn (NED) | Intermarché–Wanty–Gobert Matériaux | 23 |
| 8 | Robbe Ghys (BEL) | Sport Vlaanderen–Baloise | 22 |
| 9 | Mirco Maestri (ITA) | Bardiani–CSF–Faizanè | 22 |
| 10 | Jordy Bouts (BEL) | BEAT Cycling | 20 |

=== Team classification ===
Final team classification (1–10)
| Rank | Team | Time |
|---|---|---|
| 1 | Team Jumbo–Visma | 47h 09' 47" |
| 2 | Alpecin–Fenix | + 35" |
| 3 | Intermarché–Wanty–Gobert Matériaux | + 1' 19" |
| 4 | Lotto–Soudal | + 3' 51" |
| 5 | B&B Hotels p/b KTM | + 4' 02" |
| 6 | Pauwels Sauzen–Bingoal | + 4' 15" |
| 7 | Deceuninck–Quick-Step | + 4' 17" |
| 8 | Team Qhubeka Assos | + 4' 23" |
| 9 | Arkéa–Samsic | + 4' 53" |
| 10 | Total Direct Énergie | + 5' 40" |
