= 2023 Tour of Slovenia =

2023 UCI ProSeries
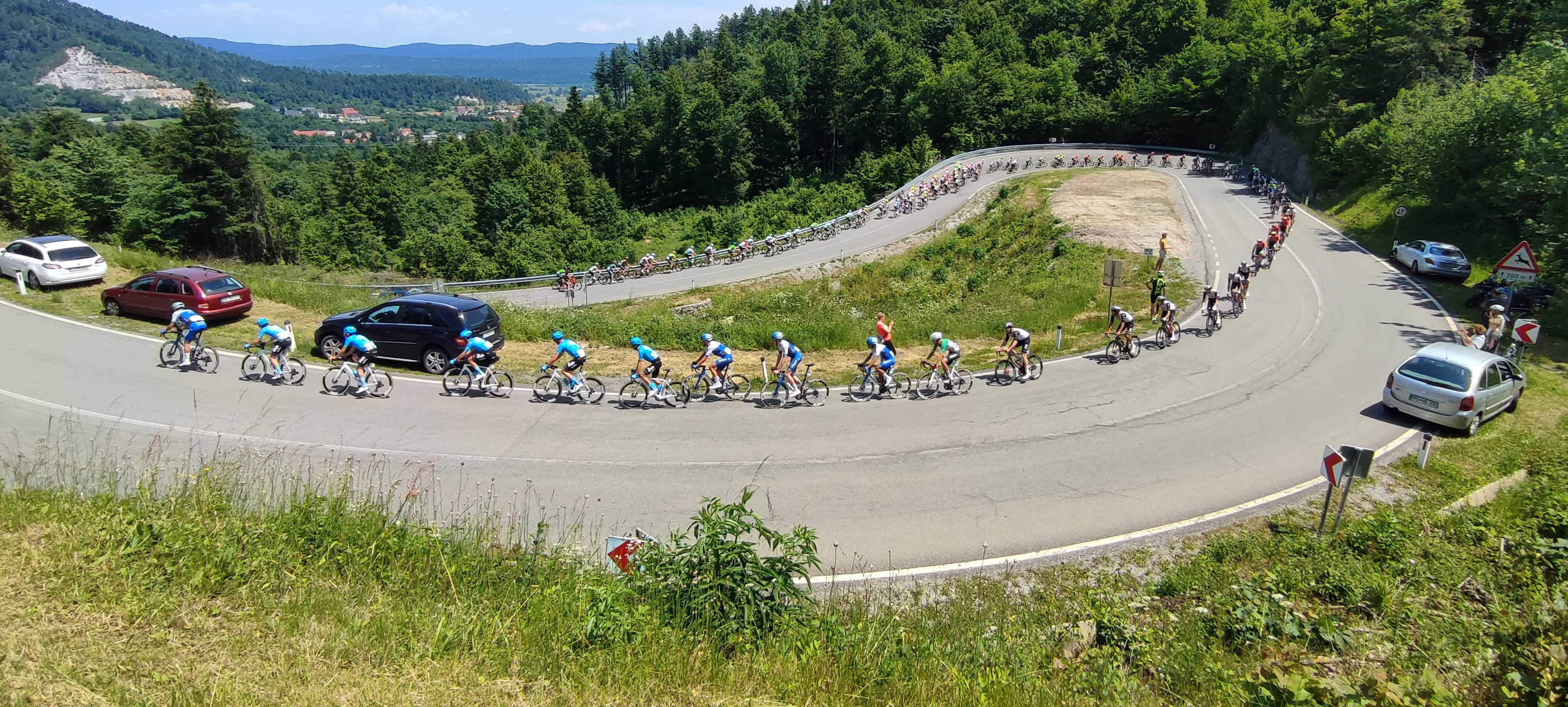
- Peloton ascending on Planina (Stage 3)

Race details
- Dates: 14–18 June 2023
- Stages: 5
- Distance: 833.3 km (517.8 mi)
- Winning time: 20h 00′ 24″

Results
Jersey awarded to the overall winner	Winner	Filippo Zana (ITA)	(Team Jayco–AlUla)
	Second	Matej Mohorič (SLO)	(Team Bahrain Victorious)
	Third	Diego Ulissi (ITA)	(UAE Team Emirates)
Jersey awarded to the points classification winner	Points	Ide Schelling (NED)	(Bora–Hansgrohe)
Jersey awarded to the mountains classification winner	Mountains	Samuele Zoccarato (ITA)	(Green Project–Bardiani–CSF–Faizanè)
Jersey awarded to the young rider classification winner	Young rider	Raúl García Pierna (COL)	(Equipo Kern Pharma)
	Team	(Spain) Equipo Kern Pharma	

The 2023 Tour of Slovenia (Slovene: Dirka po Sloveniji) was the 29th edition of the Tour of Slovenia stage race, held between 14 and 18 June 2023. The 2.Pro-category race is part of the UCI ProSeries. The race started in Celje. The tour consisted of five stages, with a total distance of 833.3 km and 9134 m of elevation gain. The total prize money was €70,775.

Tadej Pogačar was to compete for UAE Team Emirates but skipped the race due to a wrist injury. Two favourites for victory were Domen Novak and Diego Ulissi (winner of 2011 & 2019 edition), both from UAE Team Emirates, who won the last three Tours of Slovenia (2019, 2020, 2021).

The race was decided on the last two stages, with two ascents of Kolovrat (Stage 4) and the last climb to Trška Gora (Stage 5) before the finish. Filippo Zana (Team Jayco–AlUla) won the race overall, while Matej Mohorič (Team Bahrain Victorious) passed Diego Ulissi (UAE Team Emirates) for second place.

== Teams ==
Four UCI WorldTeams, ten UCI ProTeams, five UCI Continental teams, and the Slovenian national team made up the twenty teams, for a total of 138 riders at the start (112 finished it).

UCI WorldTeams

- Bora–Hansgrohe
- Team Bahrain Victorious
- Team Jayco–AlUla
- UAE Team Emirates

UCI ProTeams

- Bingoal WB
- Caja Rural–Seguros RGA
- Eolo–Kometa
- Equipo Kern Pharma
- Euskaltel–Euskadi
- Green Project–Bardiani–CSF–Faizanè
- Human Powered Health
- Q36.5 Pro Cycling Team
- Team Corratec–Selle Italia
- Tudor Pro Cycling Team

UCI Continental Teams

- Adria Mobil
- Cycling Team Kranj
- Ljubljana Gusto Santic
- RRK Group–Pierre Baguette–Benzinol
- Team Vorarlberg

National Teams

- Slovenia

== Route and stages ==
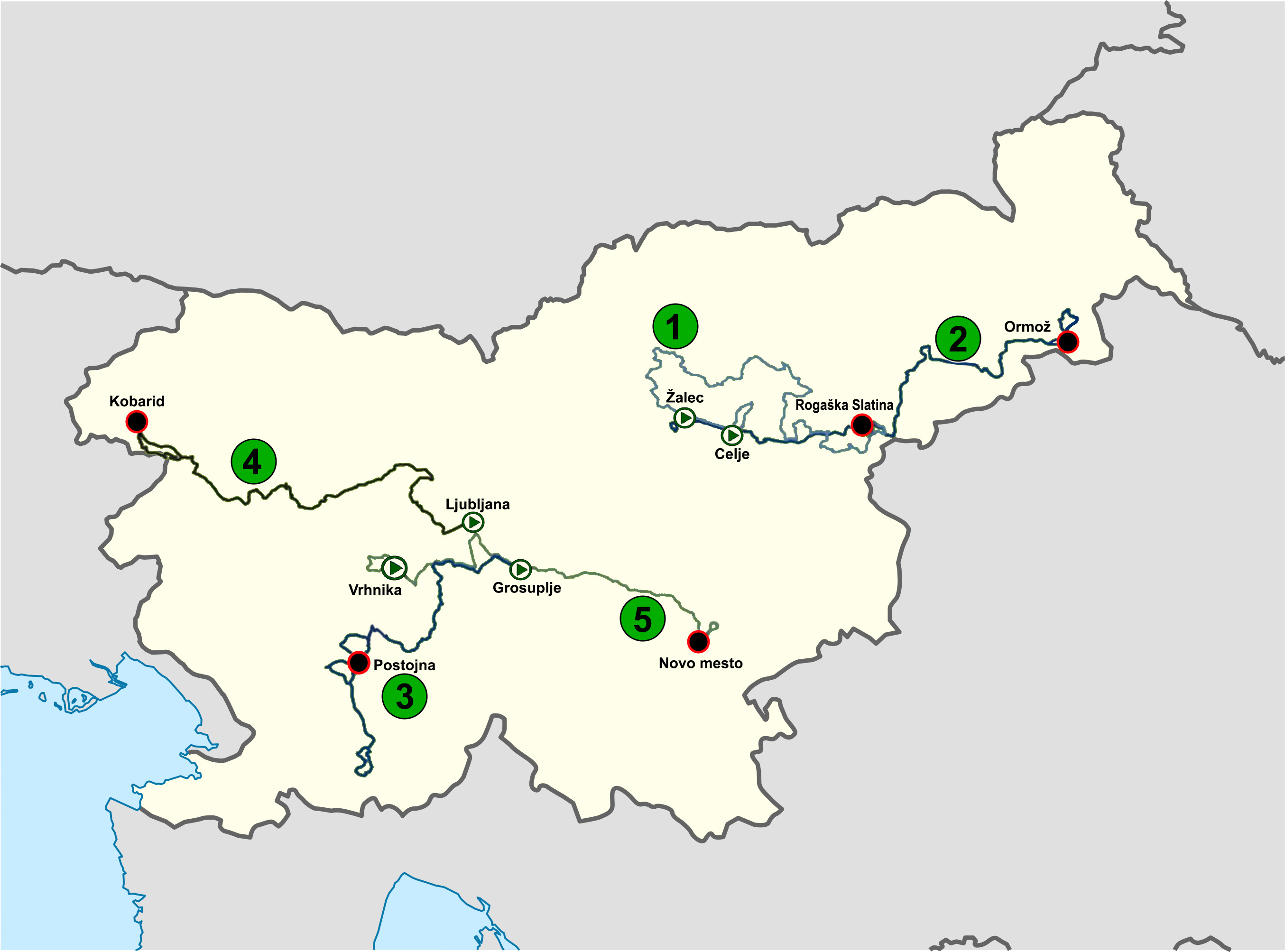

Stage characteristics and winners
Stage	Date	Course	Distance	Type	Winner
1	14 June	Celje – Rogaška Slatina	188.6 km (117.2 mi)	Hilly stage	(Netherlands) Dylan Groenewegen
2	15 June	Žalec – Ormož	163.1 km (101.3 mi)	Hilly stage	(Netherlands) Dylan Groenewegen
3	16 June	Grosuplje – Postojna	173.4 km (107.7 mi)	Hilly stage	(Netherlands) Ide Schelling
4	17 June	Ljubljana – Kobarid	165.6 km (102.9 mi)	Mountain stage	(Colombia) Jesús David Peña
5	18 June	Vrhnika – Novo Mesto	142.6 km (88.6 mi)	Hilly stage	(Slovenia) Matej Mohorič
Total			833.3 km (517.8 mi)		

== Stages ==
=== Stage 1 ===
14 June 2023 — Celje to Rogaška Slatina, 188.6 km (117.2 mi)

The stage profile was best for sprinters. It was won by Dylan Groenewegen, who had good lead-out help from Luka Mezgec (both Team Jayco–AlUla). It was his second win in Rogaška Slatina, after winning stage 2 in the 2022 Tour of Slovenia.

Stage 1

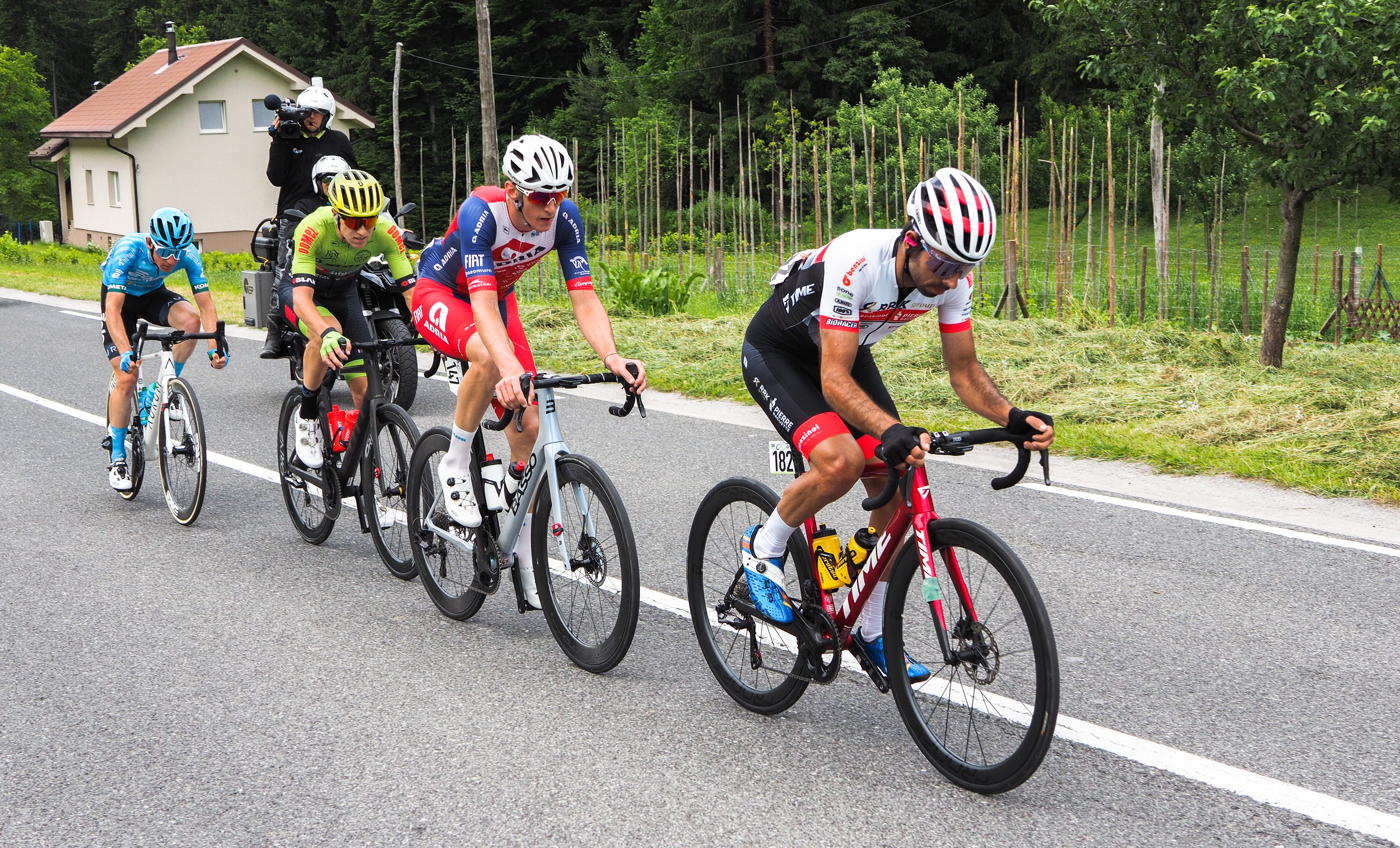
Breakaway group at km 87 near Vitanje...

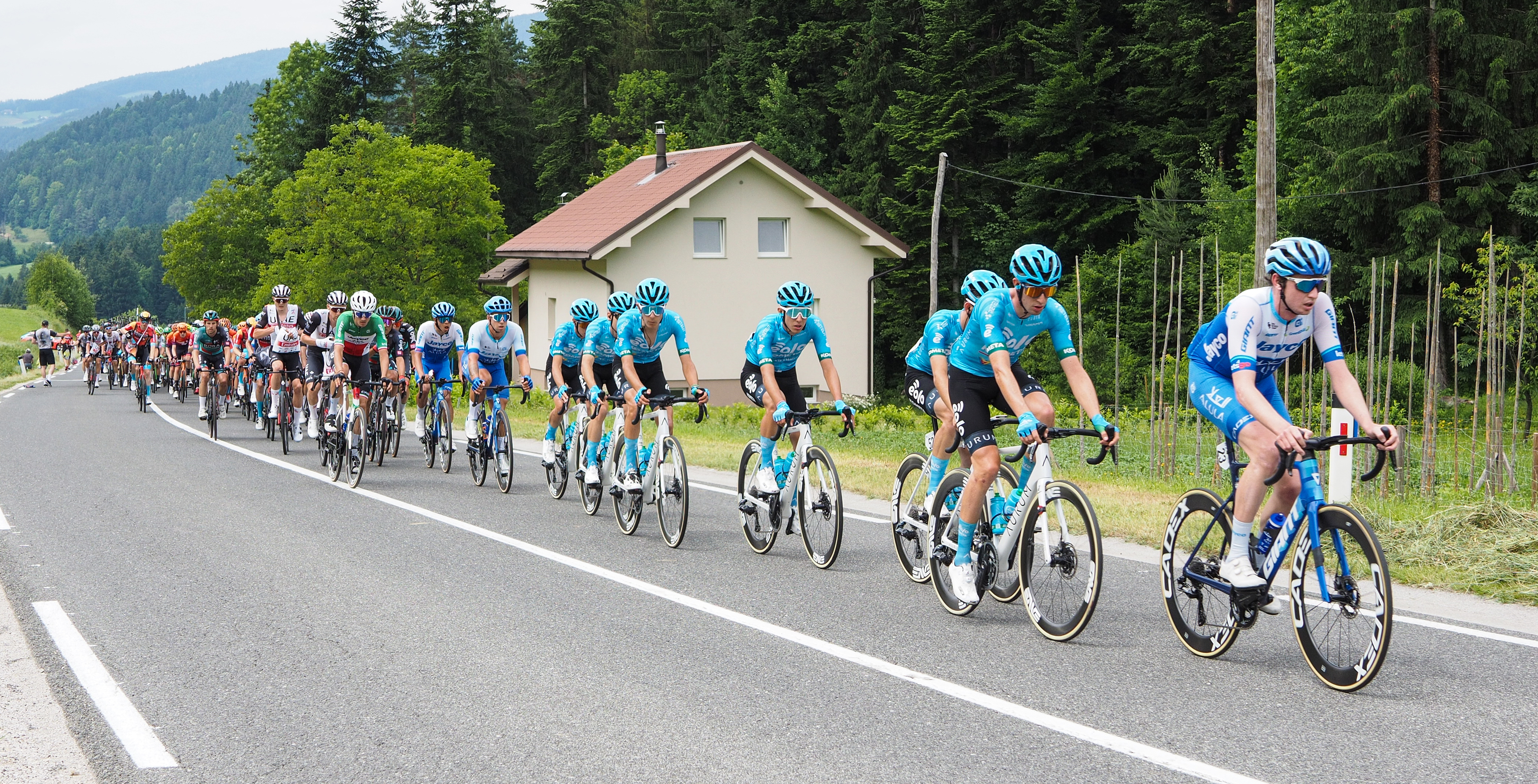
...followed by Peloton (time gap 2' 21") led by Team Jayco–AlUla and Eolo–Kometa

Stage 1 Result
Rank	Rider	Team	Time
1	Dylan Groenewegen (NED)	Team Jayco–AlUla	4h 33' 23"
2	Phil Bauhaus (GER)	Team Bahrain Victorious	+ 0"
3	Matteo Moschetti (ITA)	Q36.5 Pro Cycling Team	+ 0"
4	Stanisław Aniołkowski (POL)	Human Powered Health	+ 0"
5	David González (ESP)	Caja Rural–Seguros RGA	+ 0"
6	Ide Schelling (NED)	Bora–Hansgrohe	+ 0"
7	Robin Froidevaux (SUI)	Tudor Pro Cycling Team	+ 0"
8	Jon Barrenetxea (ESP)	Caja Rural–Seguros RGA	+ 0"
9	Fernando Barceló (ESP)	Caja Rural–Seguros RGA	+ 0"
10	Carlos Canal (ESP)	Euskaltel–Euskadi	+ 0"

General classification after Stage 1
Rank	Rider	Team	Time
1	Dylan Groenewegen (NED)	Team Jayco–AlUla	4h 33' 13"
2	Phil Bauhaus (GER)	Team Bahrain Victorious	+ 4"
3	Matteo Moschetti (ITA)	Q36.5 Pro Cycling Team	+ 6"
4	Andrea Garosio (ITA)	Eolo–Kometa	+ 7"
5	Raúl García Pierna (ESP)	Equipo Kern Pharma	+ 8"
6	Diego Ulissi (ITA)	UAE Team Emirates	+ 9"
7	Stanisław Aniołkowski (POL)	Human Powered Health	+ 10"
8	David González (ESP)	Caja Rural–Seguros RGA	+ 10"
9	Ide Schelling (NED)	Bora–Hansgrohe	+ 10"
10	Robin Froidevaux (SUI)	Tudor Pro Cycling Team	+ 10"

=== Stage 2 ===
15 June 2023 — Žalec to Ormož, 163.1 km (101.3 mi)

The profile was similar to Stage 1, with a little bit of an uphill sprint. Dylan Groenewegen won the stage with lead-out help from Luka Mezgec (both Team Jayco–AlUla).

Stage 2

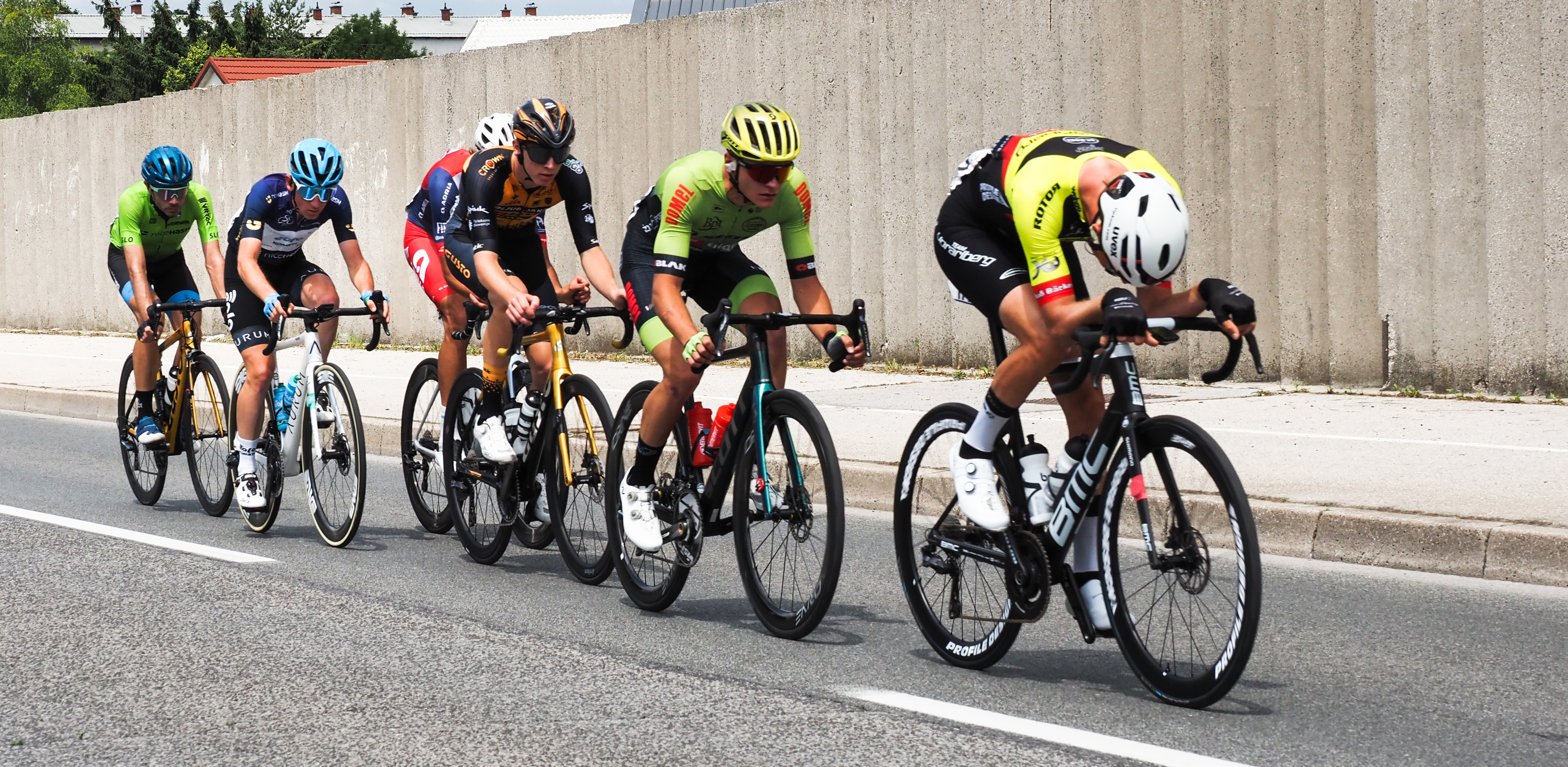
Leading group at km 24 in Celje...

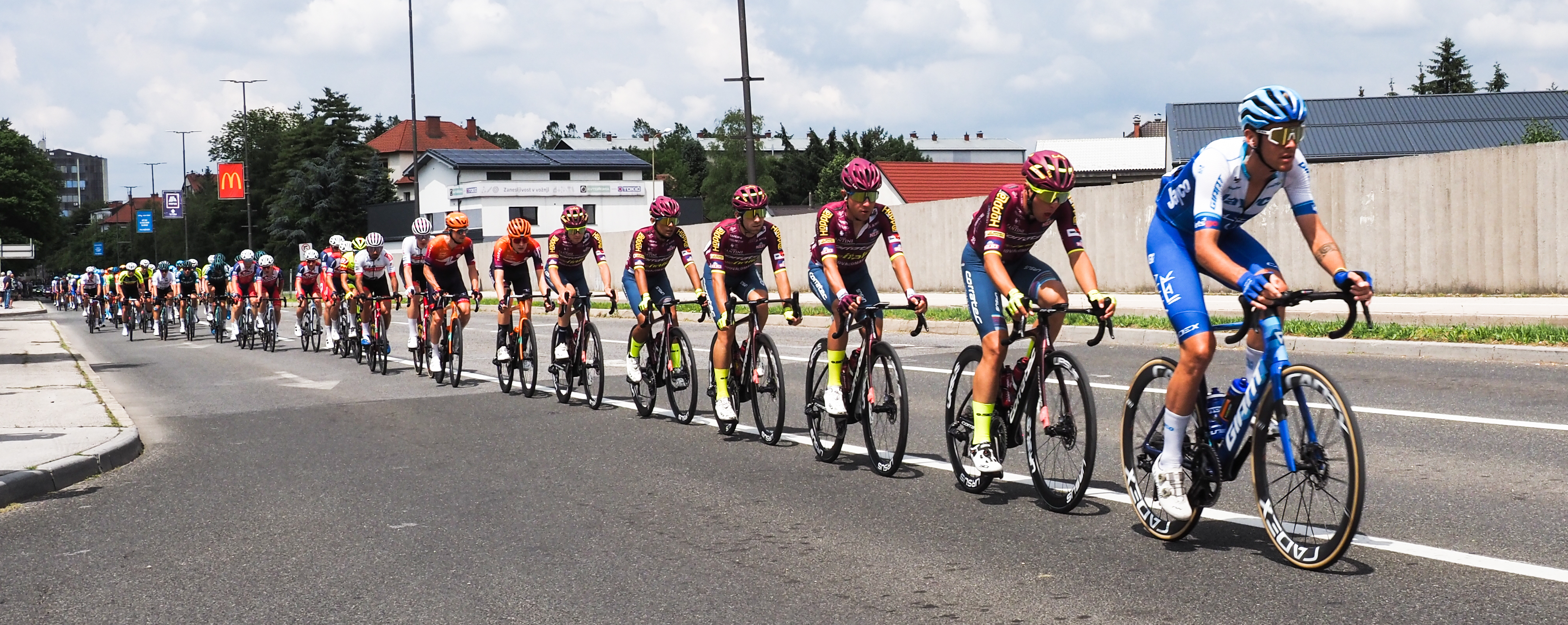
...followed by Peloton with time gap 2′ 24″

Stage 2 Result
Rank	Rider	Team	Time
1	Dylan Groenewegen (NED)	Team Jayco–AlUla	3h 49' 39"
2	Matteo Moschetti (ITA)	Q36.5 Pro Cycling Team	+ 0"
3	Phil Bauhaus (GER)	Team Bahrain Victorious	+ 0"
4	David González (ESP)	Caja Rural–Seguros RGA	+ 0"
5	Robin Froidevaux (SUI)	Tudor Pro Cycling Team	+ 0"
6	Pau Miquel (ESP)	Equipo Kern Pharma	+ 0"
7	Ide Schelling (NED)	Bora–Hansgrohe	+ 0"
8	Luca Colnaghi (ITA)	Green Project–Bardiani–CSF–Faizanè	+ 0"
9	Fernando Barceló (ESP)	Caja Rural–Seguros RGA	+ 0"
10	Martin Marcellusi (ITA)	Green Project–Bardiani–CSF–Faizanè	+ 0"

General classification after Stage 2
Rank	Rider	Team	Time
1	Dylan Groenewegen (NED)	Team Jayco–AlUla	8h 22' 42"
2	Matteo Moschetti (ITA)	Q36.5 Pro Cycling Team	+ 10"
3	Phil Bauhaus (GER)	Team Bahrain Victorious	+ 10"
4	Raúl García Pierna (ESP)	Equipo Kern Pharma	+ 18"
5	Diego Ulissi (ITA)	UAE Team Emirates	+ 19"
6	David González (ESP)	Caja Rural–Seguros RGA	+ 20"
7	Robin Froidevaux (SUI)	Tudor Pro Cycling Team	+ 20"
8	Ide Schelling (NED)	Bora–Hansgrohe	+ 20"
9	Fernando Barceló (ESP)	Caja Rural–Seguros RGA	+ 20"
10	Luca Colnaghi (ITA)	Green Project–Bardiani–CSF–Faizanè	+ 20"

=== Stage 3 ===
16 June 2023 — Grosuplje to Postojna, 173.4 km (107.7 mi)

Team Jayco–AlUla had a chance to get a third stage win, but Dylan Groenewegen missed the exit in the last roundabout, along with half the peloton. His leadout man, Luka Mezgec, came up just short in a reduced bunch sprint, won by Ide Schelling for Bora–Hansgrohe.

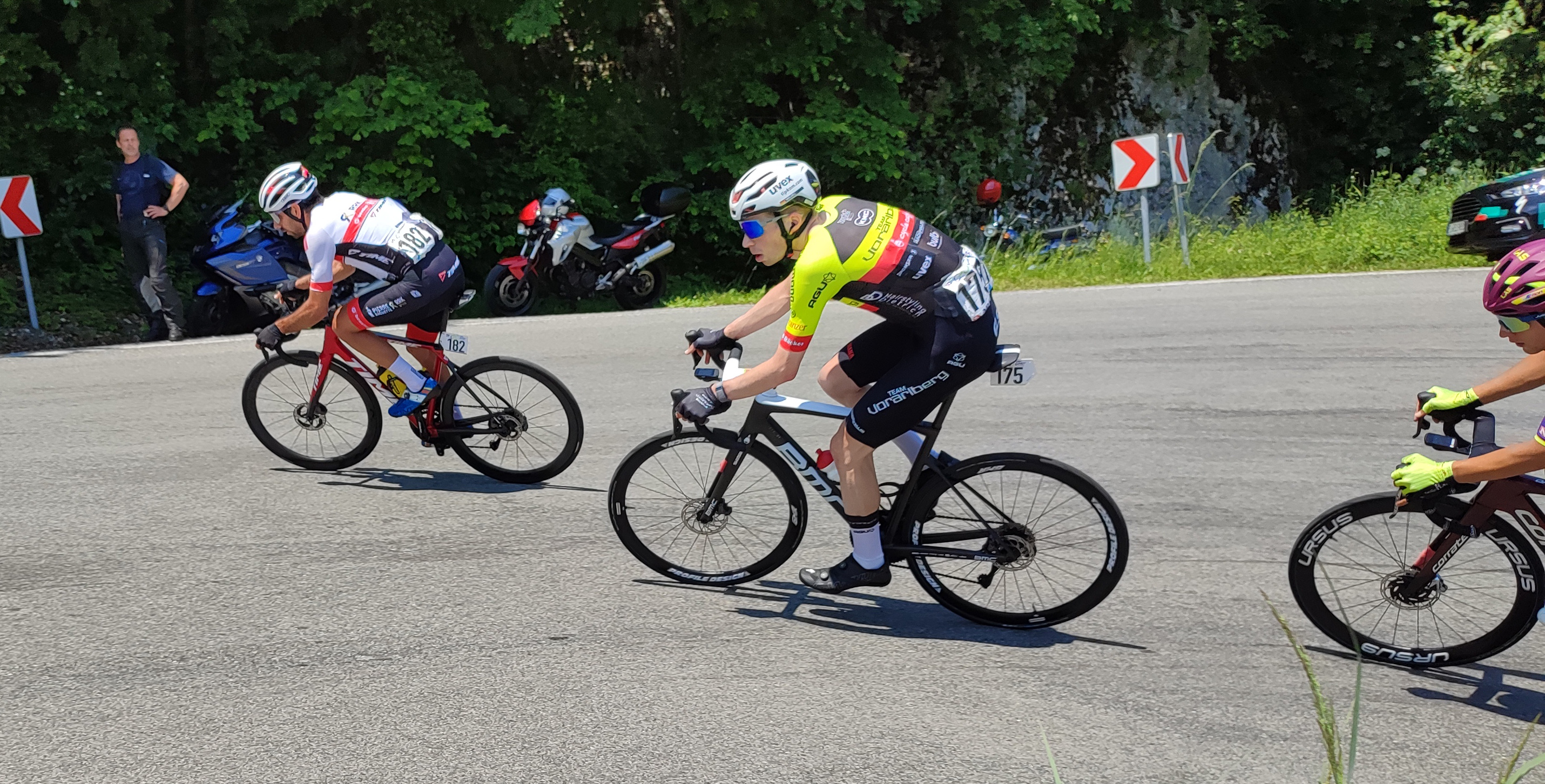
Breakaway group on Planina (4th Category climb)

Stage 3 Result
Rank	Rider	Team	Time
1	Ide Schelling (NED)	Bora–Hansgrohe	4h 08' 42"
2	Luka Mezgec (SLO)	Team Jayco–AlUla	+ 0"
3	Robin Froidevaux (SUI)	Tudor Pro Cycling Team	+ 0"
4	Marco Tizza (ITA)	Bingoal WB	+ 0"
5	Rui Oliveira (POR)	UAE Team Emirates	+ 0"
6	Jaka Primožič (SLO)	Slovenia	+ 0"
7	Lennert Teugels (BEL)	Bingoal WB	+ 0"
8	Anže Skok (SLO)	Ljubljana Gusto Santic	+ 0"
9	Floris De Tier (BEL)	Bingoal WB	+ 0"
10	Simon Pellaud (SUI)	Tudor Pro Cycling Team	+ 0"

General classification after Stage 3
Rank	Rider	Team	Time
1	Dylan Groenewegen (NED)	Team Jayco–AlUla	12h 31' 24"
2	Ide Schelling (NED)	Bora–Hansgrohe	+ 10"
3	Luka Mezgec (SLO)	Team Jayco–AlUla	+ 14"
4	Robin Froidevaux (SUI)	Tudor Pro Cycling Team	+ 16"
5	Raúl García Pierna (ESP)	Equipo Kern Pharma	+ 18"
6	Diego Ulissi (ITA)	UAE Team Emirates	+ 19"
7	Rui Oliveira (POR)	UAE Team Emirates	+ 20"
8	David González (ESP)	Caja Rural–Seguros RGA	+ 20"
9	Dylan Hopkins (AUS)	Ljubljana Gusto Santic	+ 20"
10	Joel Nicolau (ESP)	Caja Rural–Seguros RGA	+ 20"

=== Stage 4 ===
17 June 2023 — Ljubljana to Kobarid, 165.6 km (102.9 mi)

The penultimate stage was the main mountain stage (queen stage). It started from the capital Ljubljana and finished in the Julian Prealps with two climbs of Kolovrat (1 Category climb; 10,3 km at 9,5 % step, 1084 m). It was won by Colombian Jesús David Peña (Team Jayco–AlUla) despite a mechanical issue - riding on just the small chainring. This was Peña's first Pro career win.

Stage 4

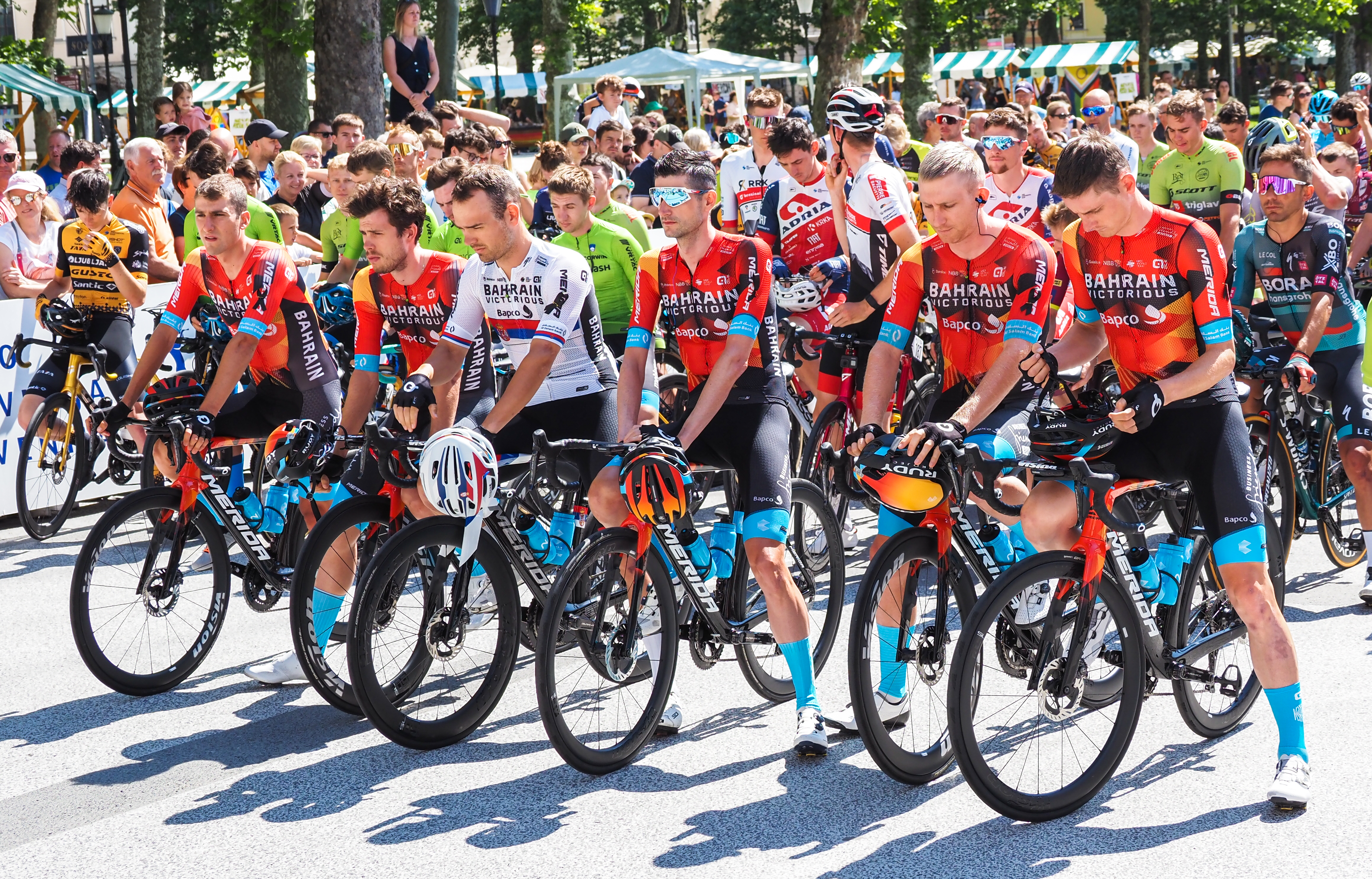
Stage 4 started with minute of silence for passed Gino Mäder

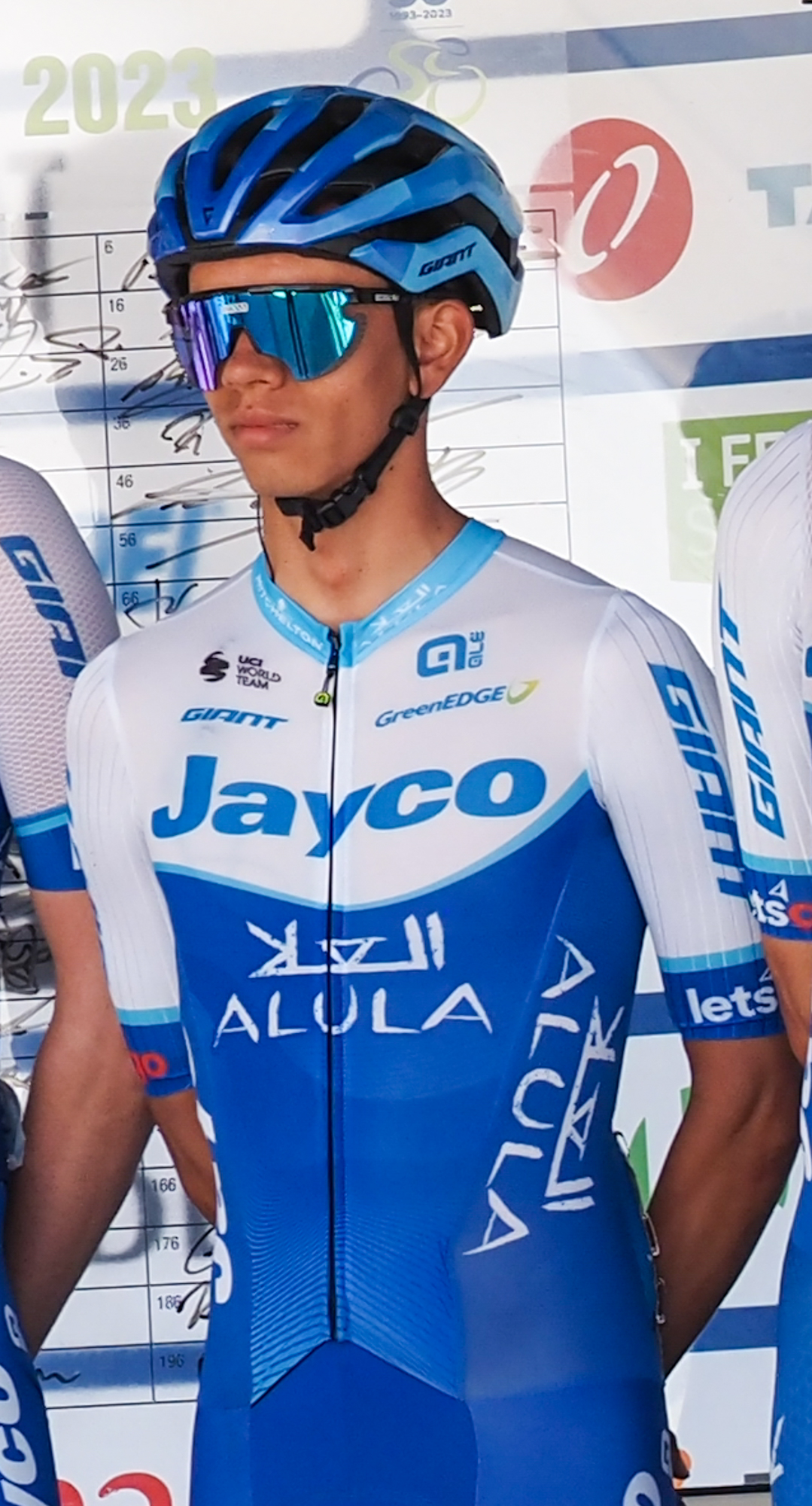
Jesús David Peña winner of Stage 4 at the morning team presentation

Stage 4 Result
Rank	Rider	Team	Time
1	Jesús David Peña (COL)	Team Jayco–AlUla	4h 20' 46"
2	Filippo Zana (ITA)	Team Jayco–AlUla	+ 17"
3	Diego Ulissi (ITA)	UAE Team Emirates	+ 17"
4	Lorenzo Fortunato (ITA)	Eolo–Kometa	+ 17"
5	Giovanni Aleotti (ITA)	Bora–Hansgrohe	+ 22"
6	Matej Mohorič (SLO)	Team Bahrain Victorious	+ 36"
7	Wout Poels (NED)	Team Bahrain Victorious	+ 36"
8	Paul Double (GBR)	Human Powered Health	+ 36"
9	Matteo Badilatti (SUI)	Q36.5 Pro Cycling Team	+ 36"
10	Ben Zwiehoff (GER)	Bora–Hansgrohe	+ 39"

General classification after Stage 4
Rank	Rider	Team	Time
1	Filippo Zana (ITA)	Team Jayco–AlUla	16h 52' 41"
2	Diego Ulissi (ITA)	UAE Team Emirates	+ 1"
3	Lorenzo Fortunato (ITA)	Eolo–Kometa	+ 6"
4	Giovanni Aleotti (ITA)	Bora–Hansgrohe	+ 11"
5	Jesús David Peña (COL)	Team Jayco–AlUla	+ 12"
6	Matej Mohorič (SLO)	Team Bahrain Victorious	+ 22"
7	Paul Double (GBR)	Human Powered Health	+ 25"
8	Wout Poels (NED)	Team Bahrain Victorious	+ 25"
9	Ben Zwiehoff (GER)	Bora–Hansgrohe	+ 28"
10	Jordi López (ESP)	Equipo Kern Pharma	+ 51"

=== Stage 5 ===
18 June 2023 — Vrhnika to Novo mesto, 142.6 km (88.6 mi)

The final stage was won by Matej Mohorič (Team Bahrain Victorious), who attacked on the last category 3 climb (Trška Gora; 1.5 km at 10.5%, max. 20%), 10 km before the finish. The only one able to follow was Filippo Zana (Team Jayco–AlUla), though Mohorič was too strong in the uphill sprint finish. Both (Zana in General classification and Mohorič in stage win) dedicated victory to passed Gino Mäder. This was Mohorič's first stage win at the Tour of Slovenia.

Due to bicycle theft, Euskaltel–Euskadi did not start the last stage. Fourteen Orbea bicycles went missing overnight in Ljubljana.

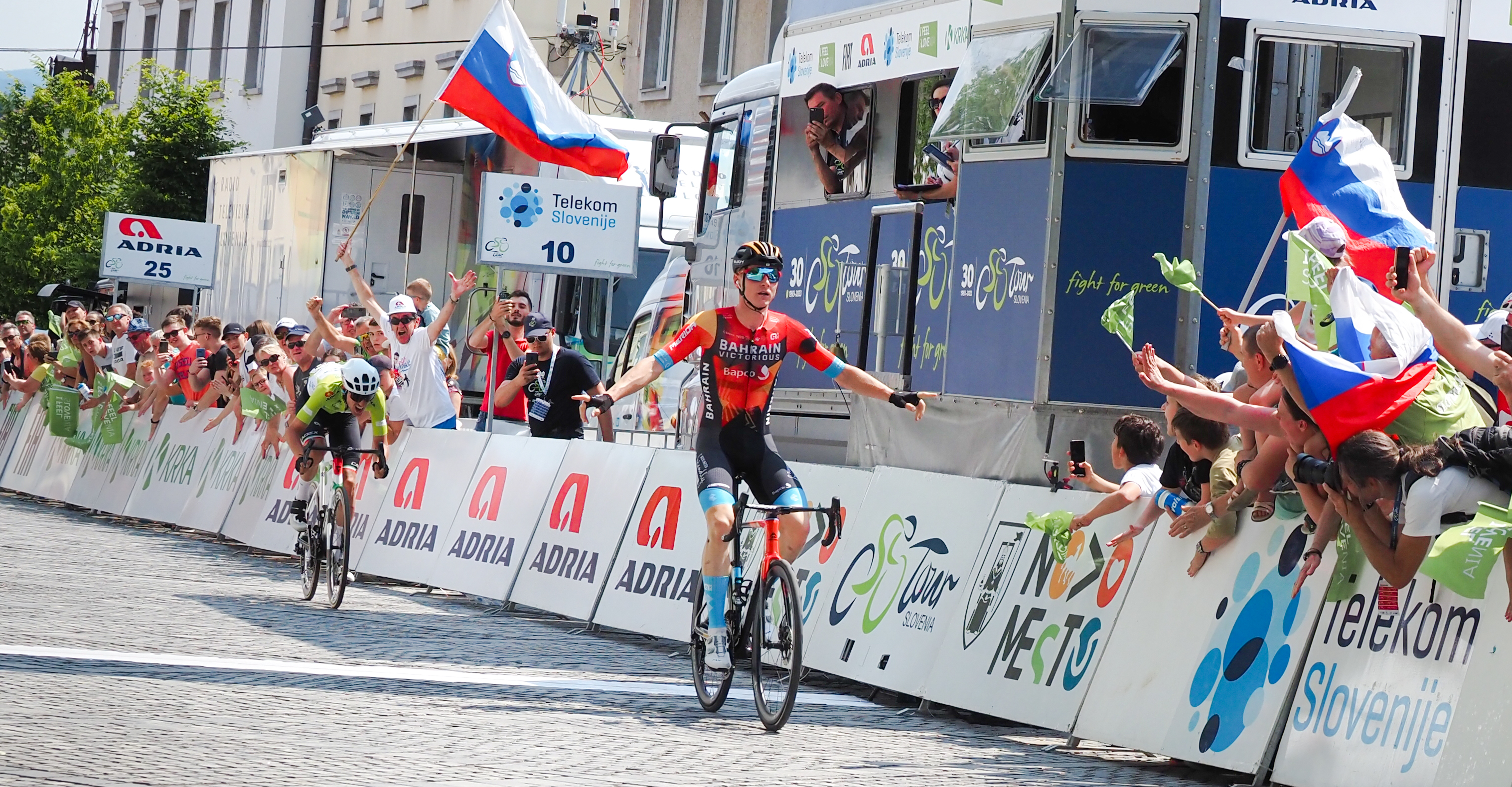
Matej Mohorič (Team Bahrain Victorious) won Stage 5 in Novo mesto. Filippo Zana (Team Jayco–AlUla) came as second.

Stage 5 Result
Rank	Rider	Team	Time
1	Matej Mohorič (SLO)	Team Bahrain Victorious	3h 07' 49"
2	Filippo Zana (ITA)	Team Jayco–AlUla	+ 0"
3	Luka Mezgec (SLO)	Team Jayco–AlUla	+ 16"
4	Lucas Eriksson (SWE)	Tudor Pro Cycling Team	+ 16"
5	Joel Nicolau (ESP)	Caja Rural–Seguros RGA	+ 16"
6	Giovanni Aleotti (ITA)	Bora–Hansgrohe	+ 16"
7	Jesús David Peña (COL)	Team Jayco–AlUla	+ 16"
8	Johan Meens (BEL)	Bingoal WB	+ 16"
9	Diego Ulissi (ITA)	UAE Team Emirates	+ 16"
10	Ben Zwiehoff (GER)	Bora–Hansgrohe	+ 16"

General classification after Stage 5
Rank	Rider	Team	Time
1	Filippo Zana (ITA)	Team Jayco–AlUla	20h 00' 24"
2	Matej Mohorič (SLO)	Team Bahrain Victorious	+ 18"
3	Diego Ulissi (ITA)	UAE Team Emirates	+ 23"
4	Giovanni Aleotti (ITA)	Bora–Hansgrohe	+ 33"
5	Jesús David Peña (COL)	Team Jayco–AlUla	+ 34"
6	Lorenzo Fortunato (ITA)	Eolo–Kometa	+ 46"
7	Ben Zwiehoff (GER)	Bora–Hansgrohe	+ 50"
8	Paul Double (GBR)	Human Powered Health	+ 1' 05"
9	Wout Poels (NED)	Team Bahrain Victorious	+ 1' 05"
10	Jordi López (ESP)	Equipo Kern Pharma	+ 1' 31"

== Classification leadership ==
Classification leadership by stage
Stage	Winner	General classification	Points classification	Mountains classification	Young rider classification	Team classification
1	Dylan Groenewegen	Dylan Groenewegen	Dylan Groenewegen	Andrea Garosio	Raúl García	Caja Rural–Seguros RGA
2	Dylan Groenewegen	Dylan Groenewegen	Dylan Groenewegen	Giovanni Aleotti	Raúl García	Caja Rural–Seguros RGA
3	Ide Schelling	Dylan Groenewegen	Dylan Groenewegen	Viktor Potočki	Raúl García	Caja Rural–Seguros RGA
4	Jesús David Peña	Filippo Zana	Ide Schelling	Samuele Zoccarato	Raúl García	Equipo Kern Pharma
5	Matej Mohorič	Filippo Zana	Ide Schelling	Samuele Zoccarato	Raúl García	Equipo Kern Pharma
Final		Filippo Zana	Ide Schelling	Samuele Zoccarato	Raúl García	Equipo Kern Pharma

== Final classification standings ==
Legend
Denotes the winner of the general classification	Denotes the winner of the mountains classification
Denotes the winner of the points classification	Denotes the winner of the young rider classification

Classification winners

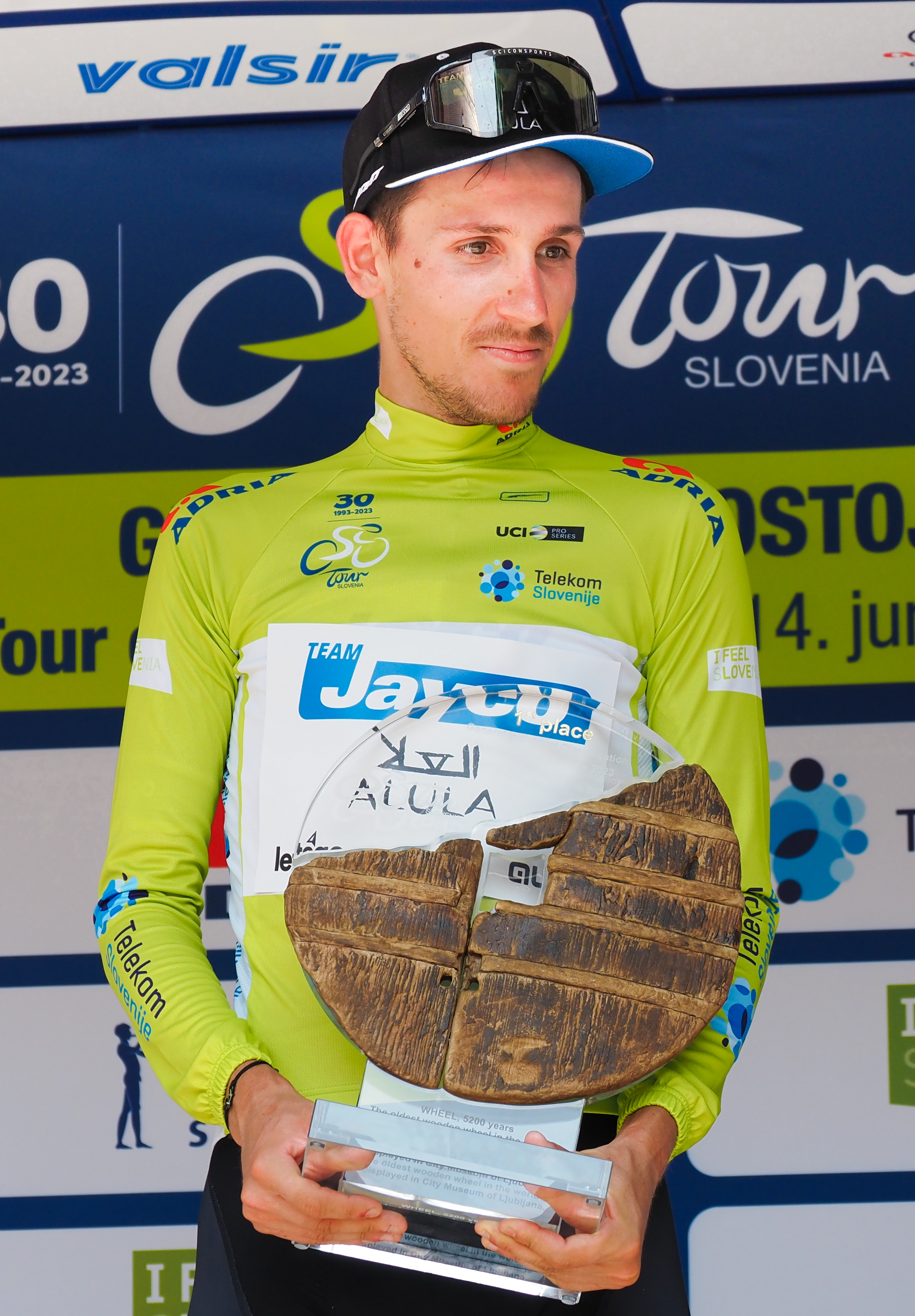
General
Filippo Zana

(Team Jayco–AlUla)

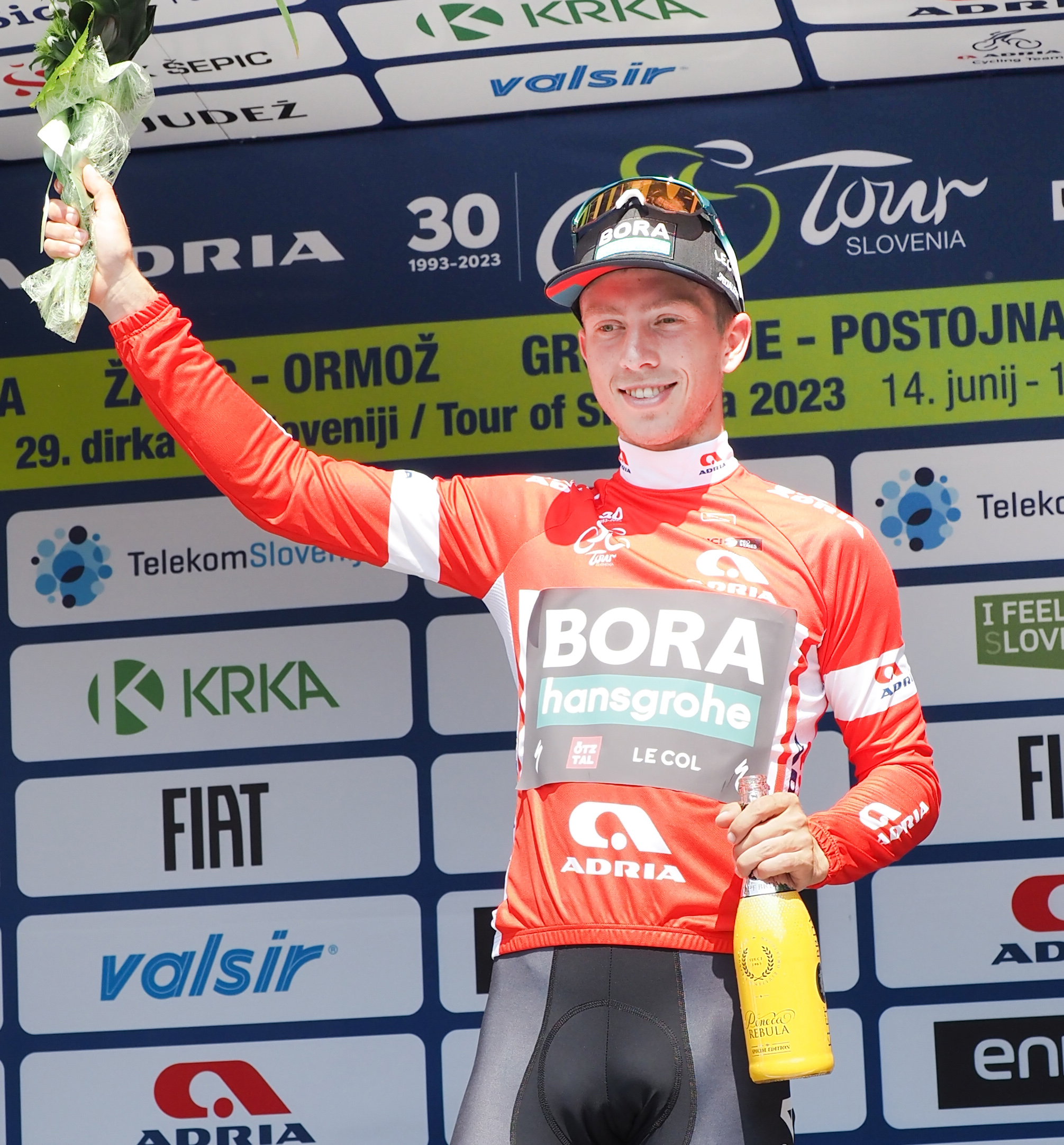
Points
Ide Schelling

(Bora–Hansgrohe)

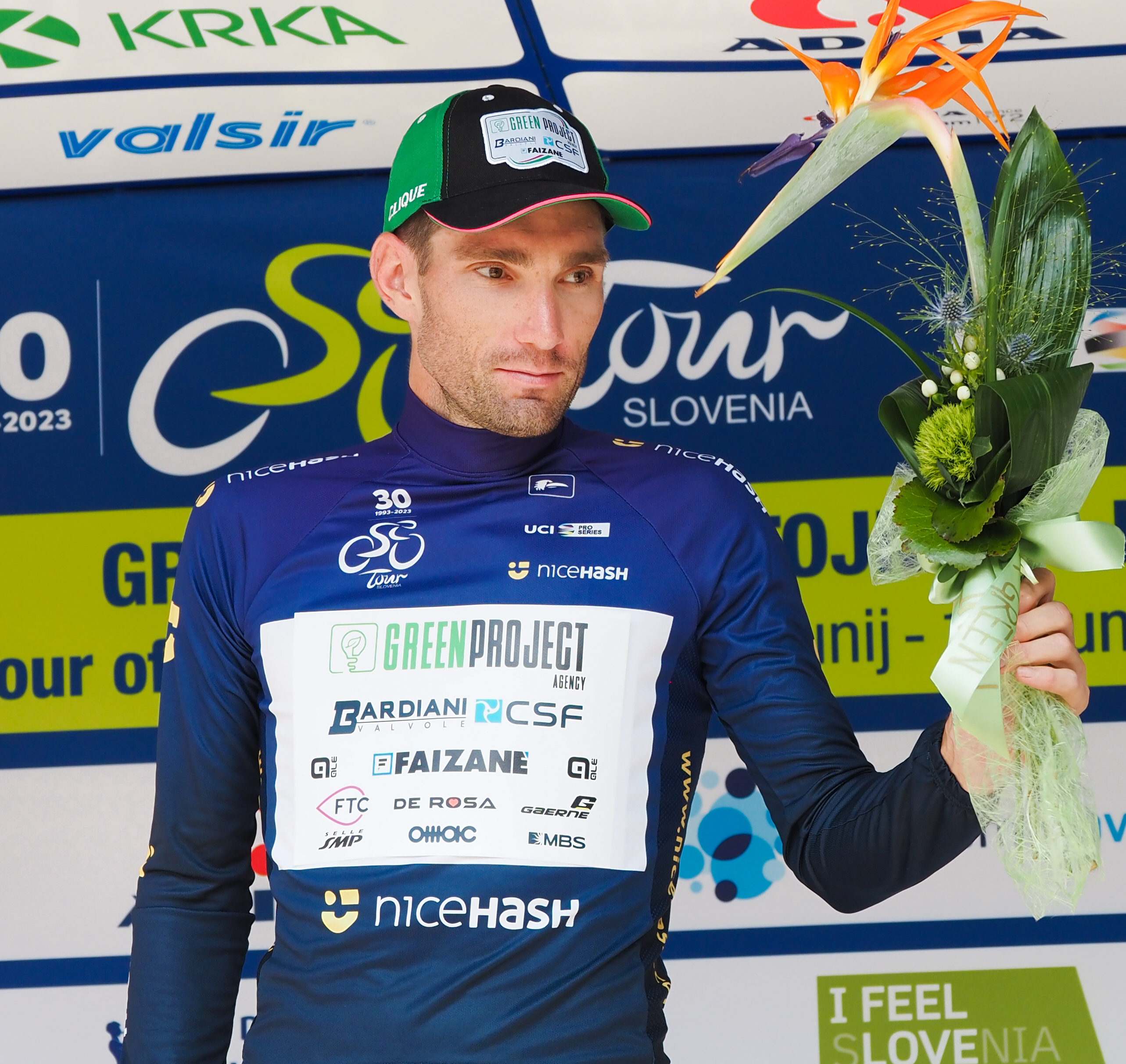
Mountains
Samuele Zoccarato

Green Project–Bardiani–CSF

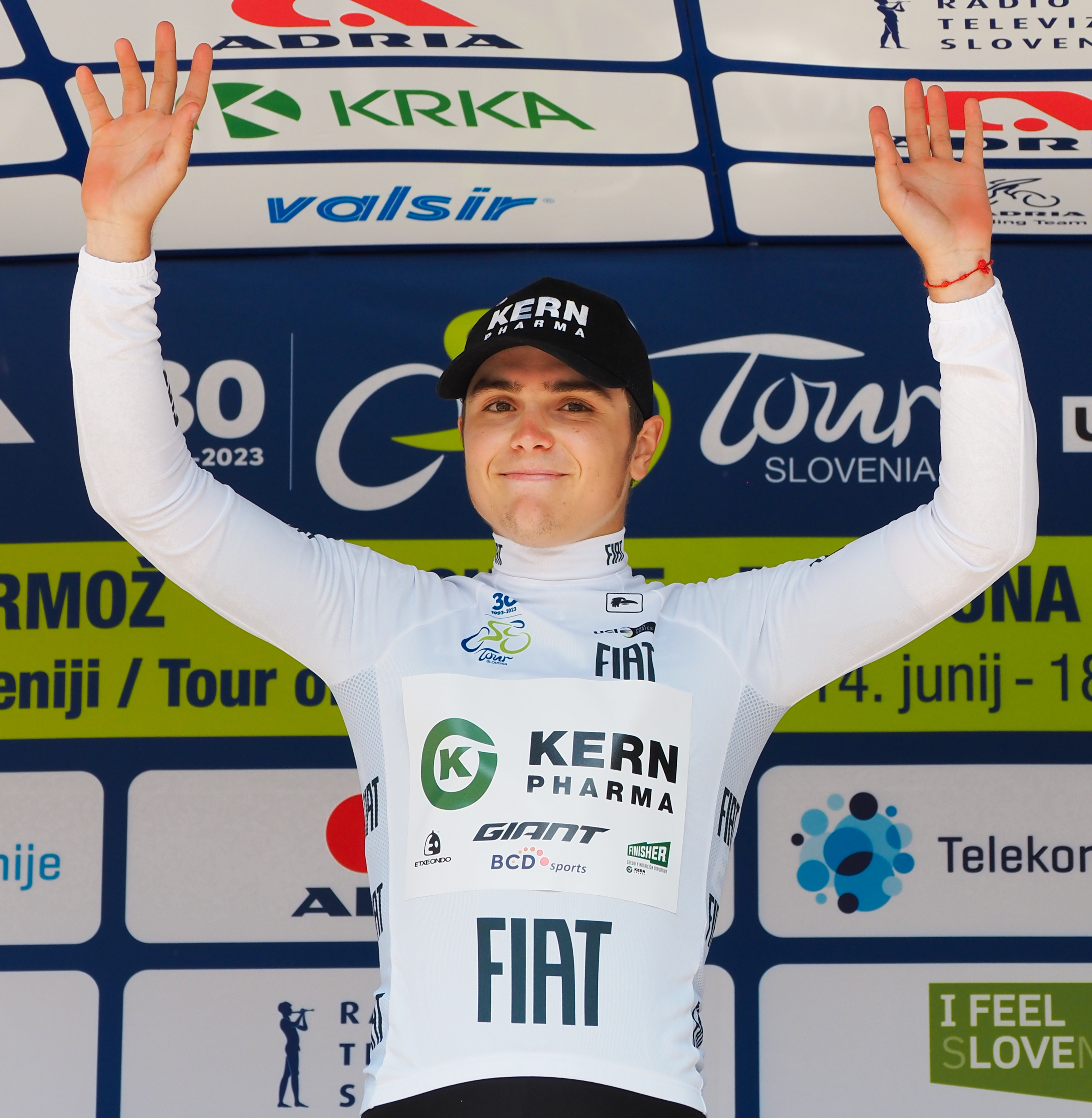
Young rider
Raúl García Pierna

(Equipo Kern Pharma)

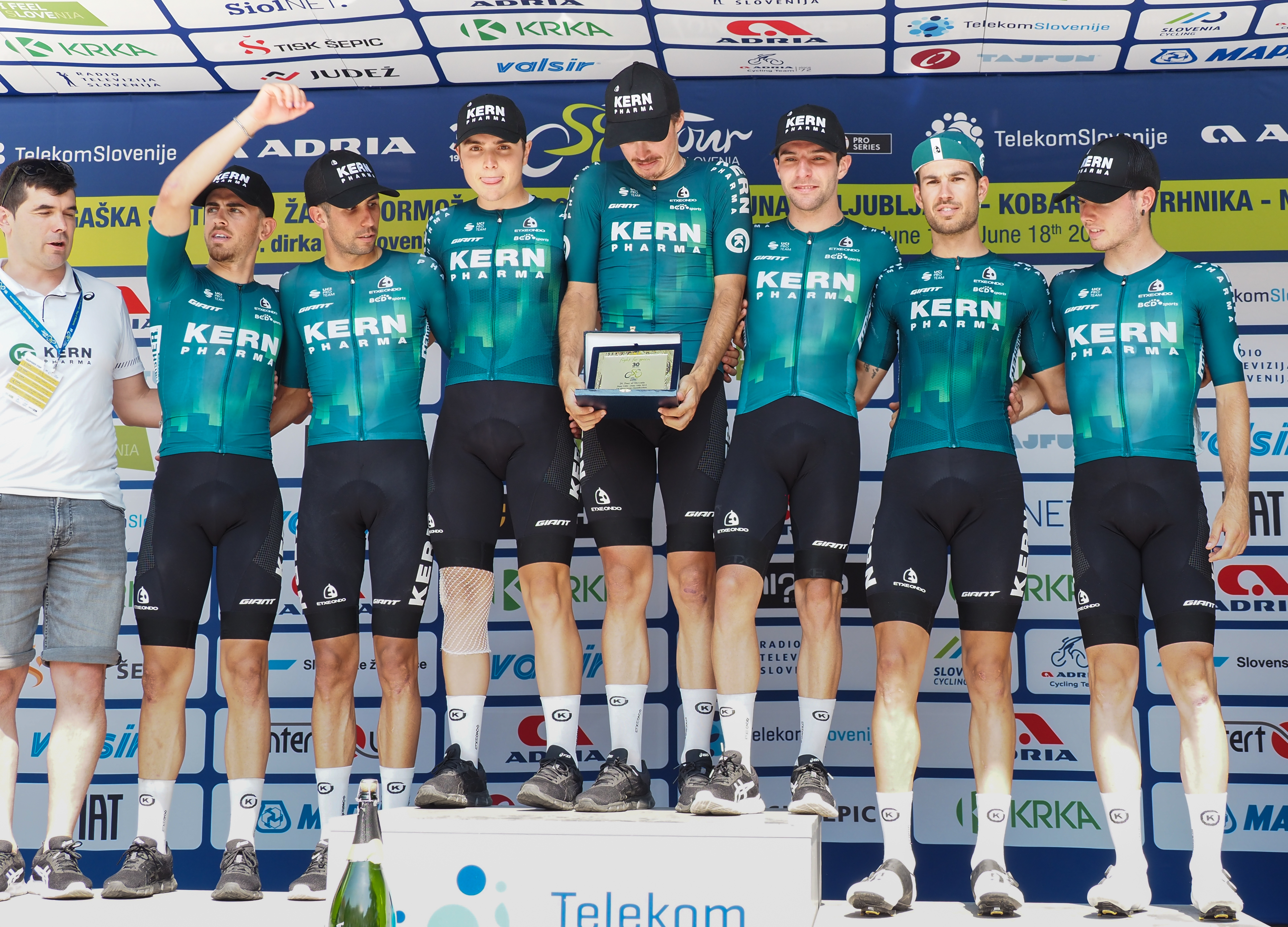
Team
Equipo Kern Pharma

=== General classification ===
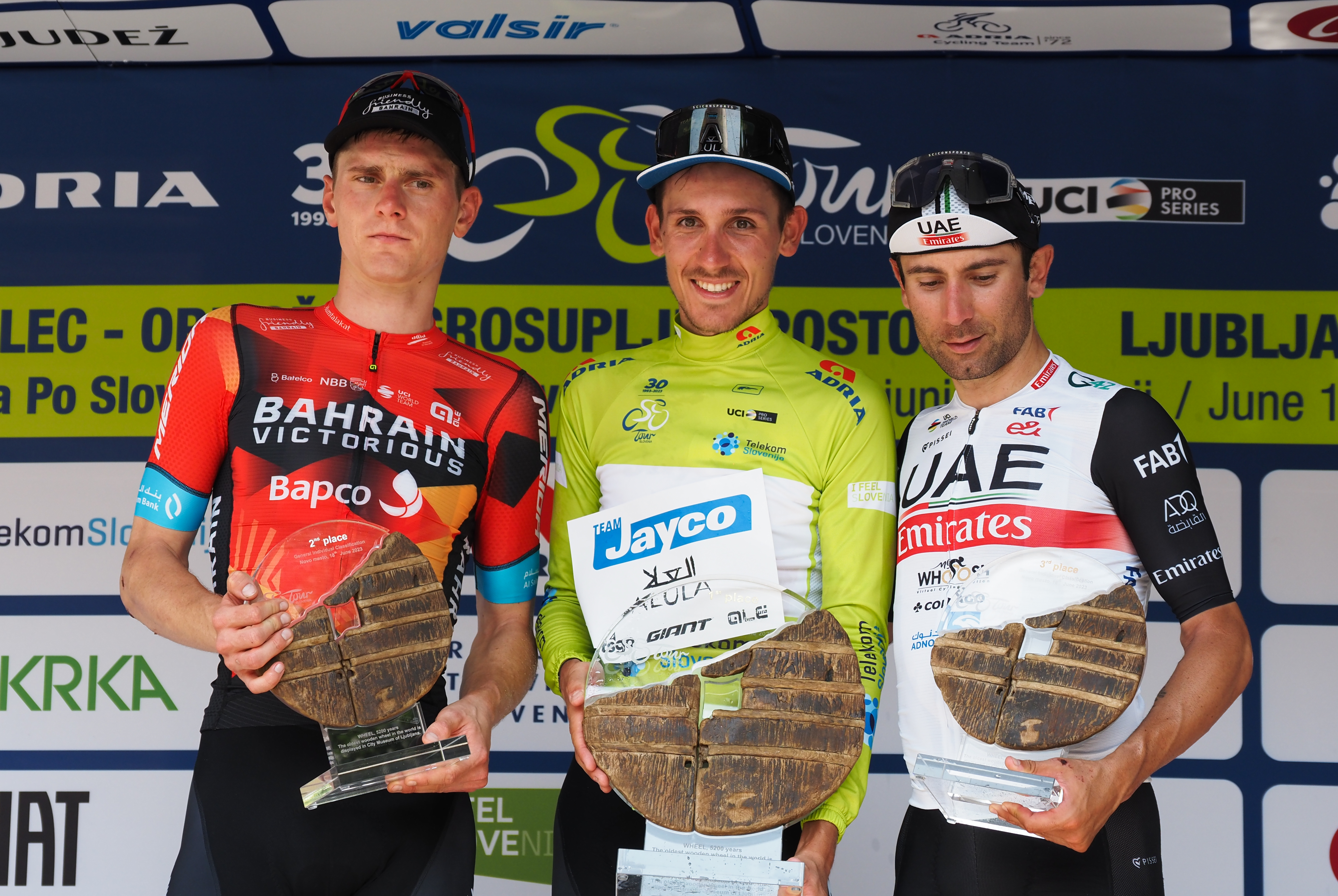
On the podium from the left: 2nd – Matej Mohorič (Team Bahrain Victorious), 1st – Filippo Zana (Team Jayco–AlUla), 3rd – Diego Ulissi (UAE Team Emirates)

Rank	Rider	Team	Time
1	Filippo Zana (ITA)	Team Jayco–AlUla	20h 00' 24"
2	Matej Mohorič (SLO)	Team Bahrain Victorious	+ 18"
3	Diego Ulissi (ITA)	UAE Team Emirates	+ 23"
4	Giovanni Aleotti (ITA)	Bora–Hansgrohe	+ 33"
5	Jesús David Peña (COL)	Team Jayco–AlUla	+ 34"
6	Lorenzo Fortunato (ITA)	Eolo–Kometa	+ 46"
7	Ben Zwiehoff (GER)	Bora–Hansgrohe	+ 50"
8	Paul Double (GBR)	Human Powered Health	+ 1' 05"
9	Wout Poels (NED)	Team Bahrain Victorious	+ 1' 05"
10	Jordi López (ESP)	Equipo Kern Pharma	+ 1' 31"

=== Points classification ===
Rank	Rider	Team	Points
1	Ide Schelling (NED)	Bora–Hansgrohe	54
2	Robin Froidevaux (SUI)	Tudor Pro Cycling Team	42
3	Matej Mohorič (SLO)	Team Bahrain Victorious	40
4	Filippo Zana (ITA)	Team Jayco–AlUla	40
5	Luka Mezgec (SLO)	Team Jayco–AlUla	38
6	Phil Bauhaus (GER)	Team Bahrain Victorious	36
7	Matteo Moschetti (ITA)	Q36.5 Pro Cycling Team	36
8	Jesús David Peña (COL)	Team Jayco–AlUla	34
9	David González (ESP)	Caja Rural–Seguros RGA	26
10	Diego Ulissi (ITA)	UAE Team Emirates	24

=== Mountains classification ===
Rank	Rider	Team	Points
1	Samuele Zoccarato (ITA)	Green Project–Bardiani–CSF–Faizanè	16
2	Filippo Zana (ITA)	Team Jayco–AlUla	12
3	Jesús David Peña (COL)	Team Jayco–AlUla	10
4	Colin Stüssi (SUI)	Team Vorarlberg	8
5	Lukas Meller (GER)	Team Vorarlberg	7
6	Giovanni Aleotti (ITA)	Bora–Hansgrohe	6
7	Ben Zwiehoff (GER)	Bora–Hansgrohe	6
8	Matteo Badilatti (SUI)	Q36.5 Pro Cycling Team	6
9	Diego Ulissi (ITA)	UAE Team Emirates	4
10	Paul Double (GBR)	Human Powered Health	4

=== Young rider classification ===
Rank	Rider	Team	Time
1	Raúl García Pierna (ESP)	Equipo Kern Pharma	20h 02' 58"
2	Marcel Camprubi (ESP)	Q36.5 Pro Cycling Team	+ 1' 10"
3	Embret Svestad-Bårdseng (NOR)	Human Powered Health	+ 5' 17"
4	Gal Glivar (SLO)	Adria Mobil	+ 18' 26"
5	Dylan Hopkins (AUS)	Ljubljana Gusto Santic	+ 18' 55"
6	Fabio Christen (SUI)	Q36.5 Pro Cycling Team	+ 19' 25"
7	Martin Voltr (CZE)	RRK Group–Pierre Baguette–Benzinol	+ 20' 15"
8	Nicolò Buratti (ITA)	Team Bahrain Victorious	+ 20' 36"
9	Natan Gregorčič (SLO)	Ljubljana Gusto Santic	+ 27' 25"
10	Daniel Vysočan (CZE)	RRK Group–Pierre Baguette–Benzinol	+ 27' 54"

=== Team classification ===
Rank	Team	Time
1	(Spain) Equipo Kern Pharma	60h 09' 57"
2	(Italy) Green Project–Bardiani–CSF–Faizanè	+ 3' 01"
3	(United States) Human Powered Health	+ 3' 19"
4	(Spain) Caja Rural–Seguros RGA	+ 6' 10"
5	(Switzerland) Q36.5 Pro Cycling Team	+ 6' 24"
6	(Australia) Team Jayco–AlUla	+ 12' 20"
7	(Germany) Bora–Hansgrohe	+ 12' 24"
8	Team Bahrain Victorious	+ 14' 36"
9	(Austria) Team Vorarlberg	+ 14' 51"
10	(Italy) Eolo–Kometa	+ 15' 03"
