= Ide Schelling =

Dutch cyclist (born 1998)

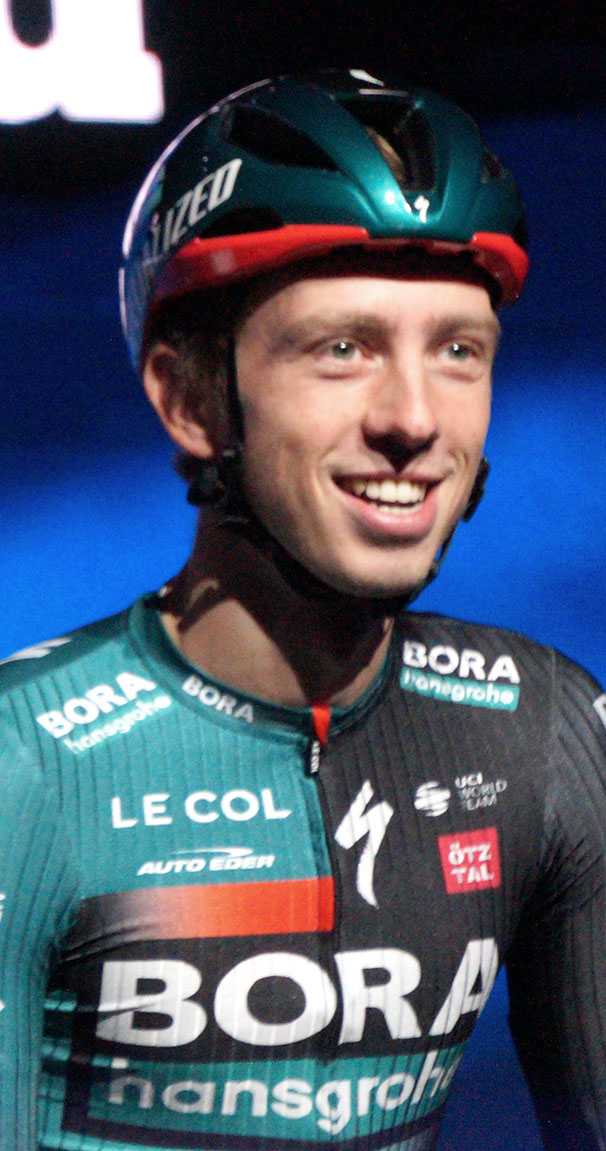
- Schelling in 2023

Personal information
- Born: 6 February 1998 (age 28) The Hague, Netherlands
- Height: 1.82 m (6 ft 0 in)
- Weight: 66 kg (146 lb)

Cycling career
- Sport: Cycling
- Current team: Retired
- Discipline: Road
- Role: Rider

Professional teams
- 2017–2019: SEG Racing Academy
- 2020–2023: Bora–Hansgrohe
- 2024–2025: Astana Qazaqstan Team

Ide Schelling (born 6 February 1998 in The Hague) is a retired Dutch cyclist, who last rode for UCI WorldTeam XDS Astana Team.

On 10 August 2023 it was announced that he would join XDS Astana Team in 2024 on a two-year contract.

Schelling retired at the end of the 2025 season.

== Major results ==
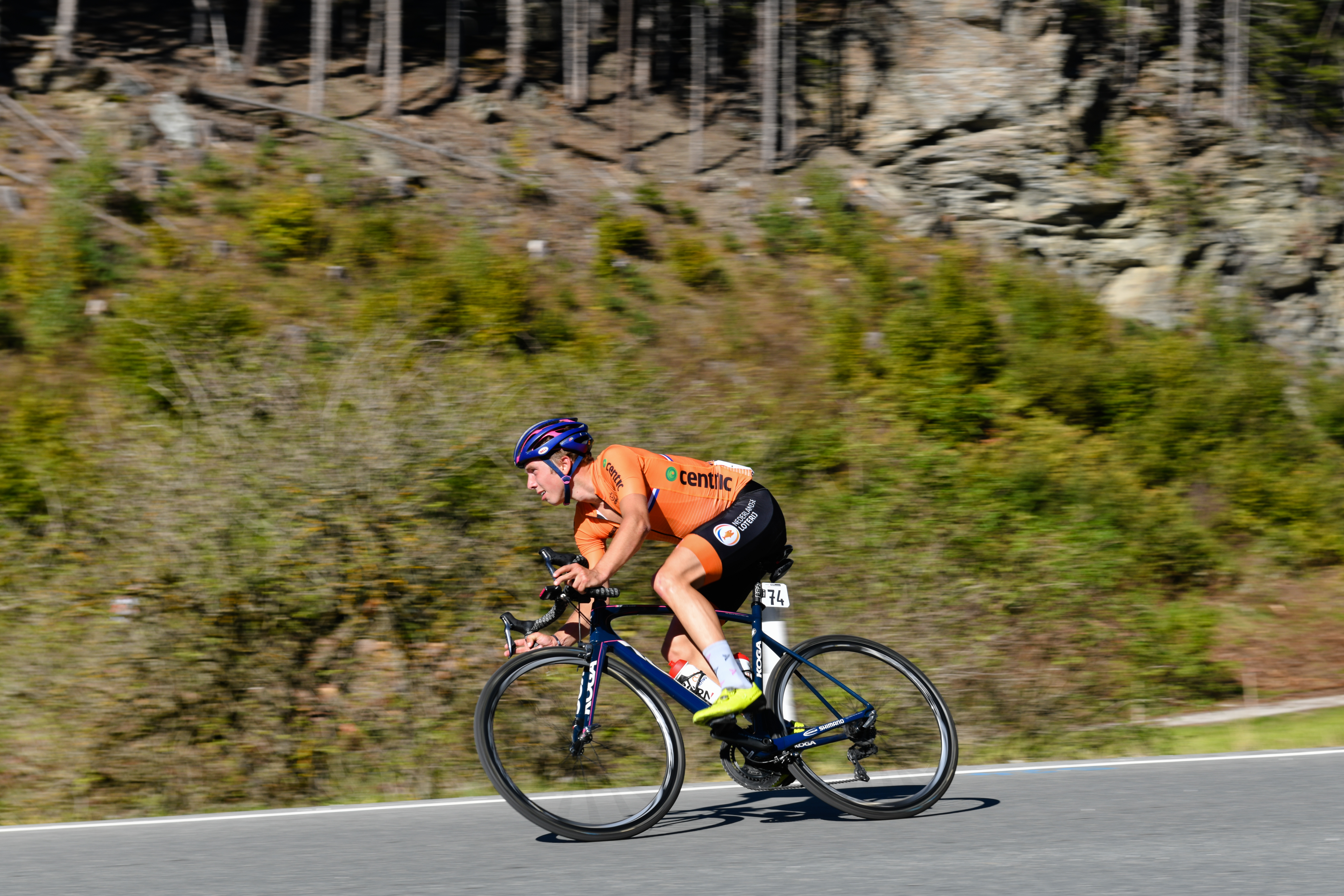
U23 World Championships in 2018.

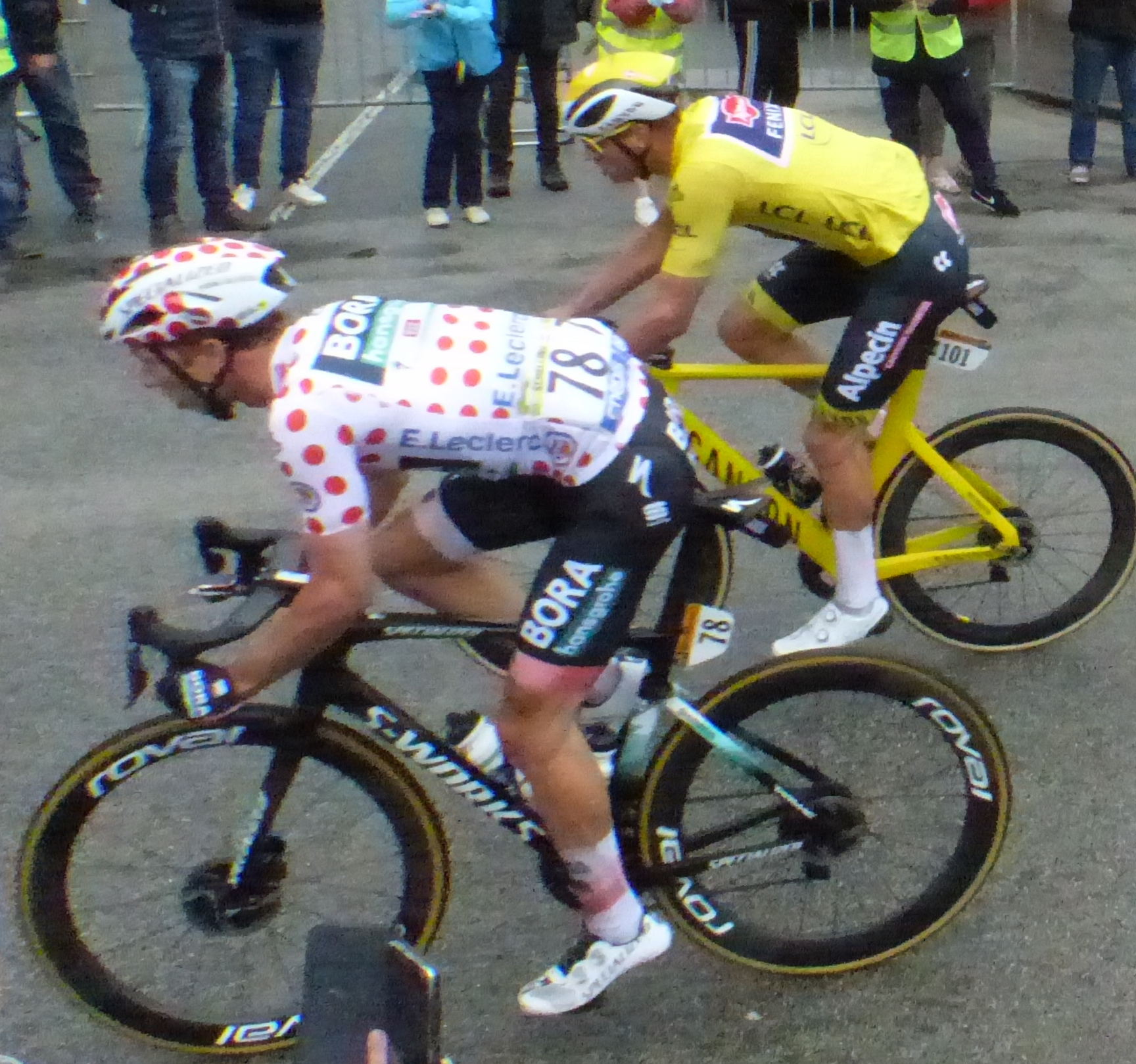
Schelling in the mountains classification jersey in the 2021 Tour de France

2015
3rd Overall Ronde des Vallées

1st Young rider classification

5th Overall Keizer der Juniores
5th Omloop der Vlaamse Gewesten
8th Overall Sint-Martinusprijs Kontich

1st Stage 1 (TTT)

9th Overall Driedaagse van Axel
2016
1st Overall Ronde des Vallées

1st Stage 1

2nd Overall Oberösterreich Juniorenrundfahrt

1st Mountains classification

4th Overall Grand Prix Rüebliland

1st Stage 1

6th Overall GP Général Patton
7th Road race, UCI Junior Road World Championships
7th Overall Internationale Niedersachsen-Rundfahrt der Junioren

1st Mountains classification

2017
1st Mountains classification, Grand Prix Priessnitz spa
2018
4th Liège–Bastogne–Liège U23
2019
6th Overall Ronde de l'Isard
8th Overall Giro della Valle d'Aosta

1st Stage 1

2021 (1 pro win)
1st Grosser Preis des Kantons Aargau
2nd Overall Tour of Norway
4th Time trial, National Road Championships
4th Brabantse Pijl
5th Overall Tour of Belgium
5th Circuito de Getxo
5th GP Industria & Artigianato di Larciano
Tour de France

Held after Stages 1 & 3–6
Combativity award Stage 1

2023 (2)
Tour of Slovenia

1st Points classification
1st Stage 3

1st Stage 2 Tour of the Basque Country
8th Muscat Classic

=== Grand Tour general classification results timeline ===
Grand Tour	2020	2021	2022	2023	2024
Giro d'Italia	—	—	—	—	—
Tour de France	—	119	—	—	—
Vuelta a España	69	—	—	—	134

Legend
—	Did not compete
DNF	Did not finish
