= Filippo Zana =

Italian cyclist (born 1999)

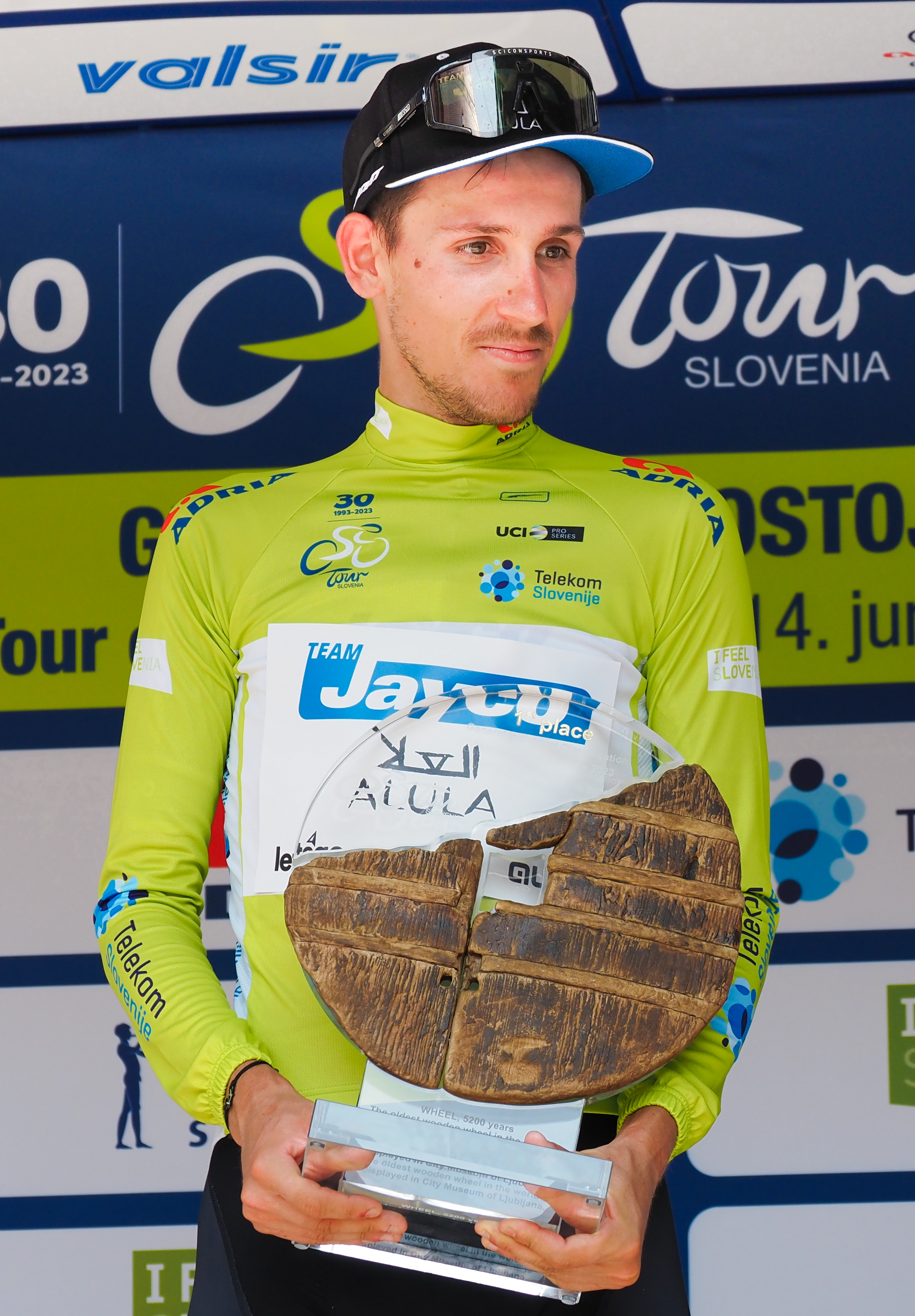
- Zana at the 2023 Tour of Slovenia

Personal information
- Born: 18 March 1999 (age 27) Thiene, Italy
- Height: 1.85 m (6 ft 1 in)
- Weight: 65 kg (143 lb)

Cycling career
- Sport: Cycling
- Current team: Soudal–Quick-Step
- Discipline: Road
- Role: Rider
- Rider type: Climber

Professional teams
- 2018–2019: Trevigiani Phonix–Hemus 1896
- 2020–2022: Bardiani–CSF–Faizanè
- 2023–2025: Team Jayco–AlUla
- 2026–: Soudal–Quick-Step

Major wins
- Grand Tours Giro d'Italia 1 individual stage (2023) Stage races Tour of Slovenia (2023) Single-day races and Classics National Road Race Championships (2022)

Filippo Zana (born 18 March 1999) is an Italian professional racing cyclist who rides for UCI WorldTeam Soudal–Quick-Step. Professional since 2020, he has won the 2023 Tour of Slovenia as well as stage 18 of the 2023 Giro d'Italia. He was also the 2022 Italian national road race champion.

== Major results ==
2016
2nd Trofeo Emilio Paganessi
3rd G.P. Sportivi Sovilla
6th Road race, UEC European Junior Road Championships
2017
1st G.P. Sportivi Sovilla
2nd Trofeo Guido Dorigo
2nd Trofeo Buffoni
7th Road race, UCI Junior Road World Championships
2018
1st Gran Premio Capodarco
6th GP Kranj
10th Gran Premio della Liberazione
2019
2nd Giro del Medio Brenta
3rd Road race, National Under-23 Road Championships
3rd Gran Premio Sportivi di Poggiana
3rd Coppa della Pace
8th Trofeo Edil C
10th Overall Giro Ciclistico d'Italia
2020
10th Memorial Marco Pantani
2021 (1 pro win)
1st Overall Czech Cycling Tour

1st Points classification
1st Young rider classification

1st Overall Grand Prix Priessnitz spa

1st Stage 2

2nd Overall Istrian Spring Trophy

1st Stage 2

3rd Overall Tour de l'Avenir
5th Overall Adriatica Ionica Race
6th Road race, UEC European Under-23 Road Championships
2022 (2)
1st Road race, National Road Championships
1st Overall Adriatica Ionica Race

1st Young rider classification

4th Overall Czech Cycling Tour
7th Overall Tour du Limousin

1st Young rider classification

2023 (2)
1st Overall Tour of Slovenia
1st Stage 18 Giro d'Italia
3rd Veneto Classic
5th Giro della Toscana
6th Tre Valli Varesine
2024
5th Veneto Classic
8th Overall Tour of Slovenia
9th Strade Bianche
2025
9th Overall CRO Race
10th Overall Tour de Pologne
2026 (2)
1st Overall Giro di Sardegna

1st Stage 4

7th Cadel Evans Great Ocean Road Race
8th Overall Tour Down Under
9th Giro di Lombardia
10th Liège–Bastogne–Liège

=== Grand Tour general classification results timeline ===
Grand Tour	2020	2021	2022	2023	2024
Giro d'Italia	100	73	47	18	11
Tour de France	—	—	—	—	
Vuelta a España	—	—	—	DNF	

Legend
—	Did not compete
DNF	Did not finish
