= Jesús David Peña =

Colombian cyclist

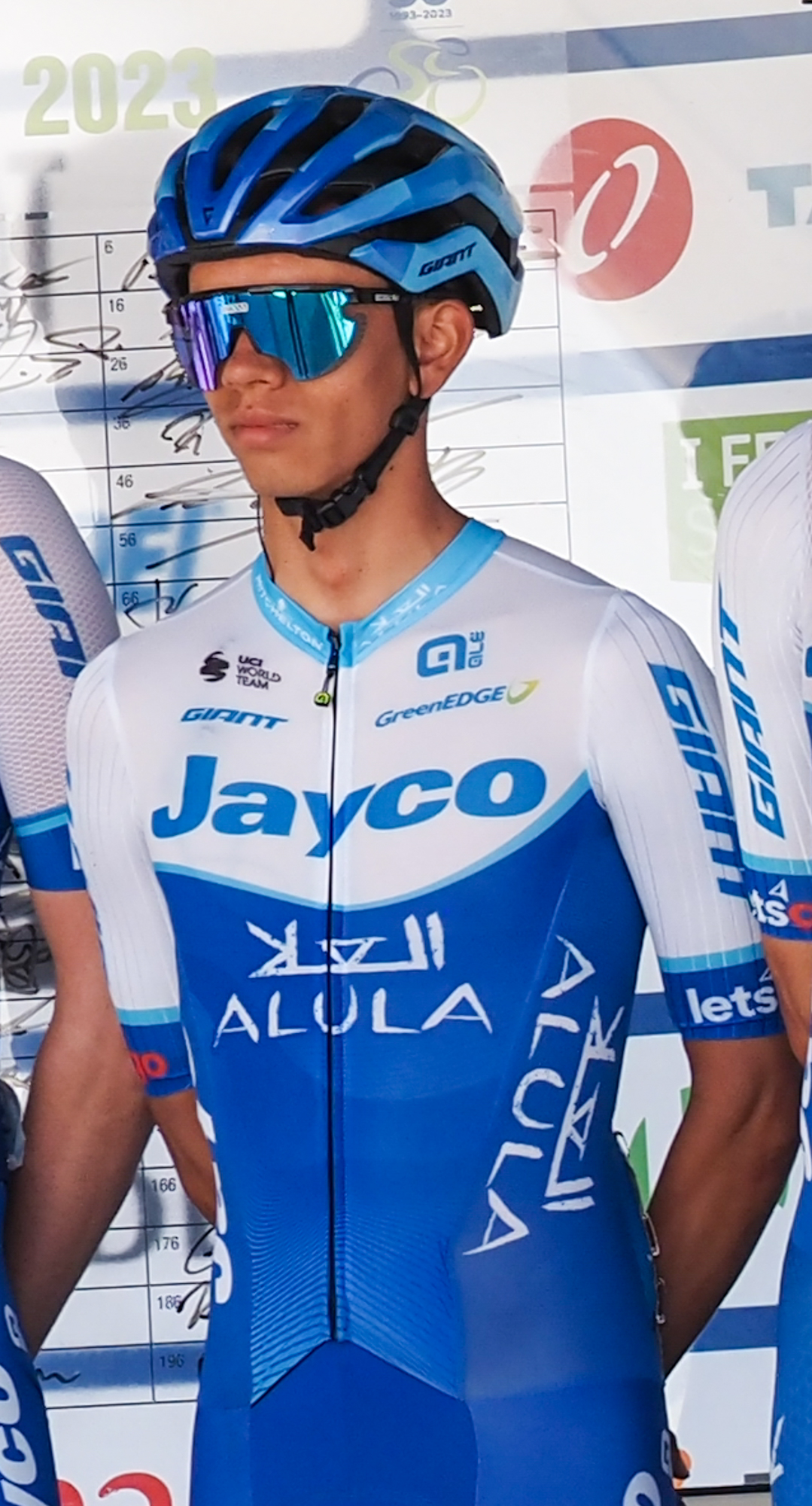
- Jesús David Peña at 2023 Tour of Slovenia

Personal information
- Full name: Jesús David Peña Jiménez
- Born: 8 May 2000 (age 26) Zipaquirá, Colombia

Cycling career
- Sport: Cycling
- Discipline: Road
- Role: Rider
- Rider type: Climber

Amateur team
- 2021: Colombia Tierra de Atletas–GW Bicicletas

Professional teams
- 2019: Coldeportes Bicicletas Strongman
- 2020: Colombia Tierra de Atletas–GW Bicicletas
- 2022–2024: Team BikeExchange–Jayco

Jesús David Peña (born 8 May 2000 in Zipaquirá) is a Colombian professional road racing cyclist, who last rode for UCI WorldTeam Team Jayco–AlUla.

== Major results ==
2019
1st Overall Vuelta de la Juventud de Colombia

1st Stage 4

7th Overall Giro Ciclistico d'Italia
2021
1st Overall Vuelta de la Juventud de Colombia

1st Stages 1 & 2

2023
2nd Taiwan KOM Challenge
3rd Overall Tour of Austria

1st Young rider classification

5th Overall Tour of Slovenia

1st Stage 4

7th Clásica de Ciclismo Ciudad de Villeta
8th Overall Tour of Guangxi
