= 2023 Veneto Classic =

2023 UCI ProSeries

Race details
- Dates: 15 October 2023
- Stages: 1
- Distance: 196.25 km (121.9 mi)
- Winning time: 4h 30' 09"

Results
	Winner	Davide Formolo (ITA)	(UAE Team Emirates)
	Second	Marc Hirschi (SUI)	(UAE Team Emirates)
	Third	Filippo Zana (ITA)	(Team Jayco–AlUla)

The 2023 Veneto Classic was the 3rd edition of the Veneto Classic single-day cycling race. It was held on 15 October 2023, over a distance of 196.25 km, starting in Mel and ending in Bassano del Grappa.

The race was won by Davide Formolo of UAE Team Emirates.

== Teams ==
Seven UCI WorldTeams, seven UCI ProTeams, and six UCI Continental teams made up the twenty teams that participated in the race.

UCI WorldTeams

- AG2R Citroën Team
- Alpecin–Deceuninck
- Arkéa–Samsic
- Astana Qazaqstan Team
- Lidl–Trek
- Team Jayco–AlUla
- UAE Team Emirates

UCI ProTeams

- Eolo–Kometa
- Green Project–Bardiani–CSF–Faizanè
- Israel–Premier Tech
- Lotto–Dstny
- Q36.5 Pro Cycling Team
- Tudor Pro Cycling Team
- Uno-X Pro Cycling Team

UCI Continental teams

- Biesse–Carrera
- General Store–Essegibi–Fratelli Curia
- GW Shimano–Sidermec
- MG.K vis Colors for Peace
- Maloja Pushbikers
- Work Service–Vitalcare–Dynatek

== Results ==
Result
Rank	Rider	Team	Time
1	Davide Formolo (ITA)	UAE Team Emirates	4h 30' 09"
2	Marc Hirschi (SUI)	UAE Team Emirates	+ 14"
3	Filippo Zana (ITA)	Team Jayco–AlUla	+ 16"
4	Andrea Vendrame (ITA)	AG2R Citroën Team	+ 28"
5	Andreas Kron (DEN)	Lotto–Dstny	+ 28"
6	Samuele Battistella (ITA)	Astana Qazaqstan Team	+ 28"
7	Florian Vermeersch (BEL)	Lotto–Dstny	+ 44"
8	Torstein Træen (NOR)	Uno-X Pro Cycling Team	+ 47"
9	Axel Laurance (FRA)	Alpecin–Deceuninck	+ 52"
10	Filippo Fiorelli (ITA)	Green Project–Bardiani–CSF–Faizanè	+ 52"
