= Cédric Beullens =

Belgian cyclist

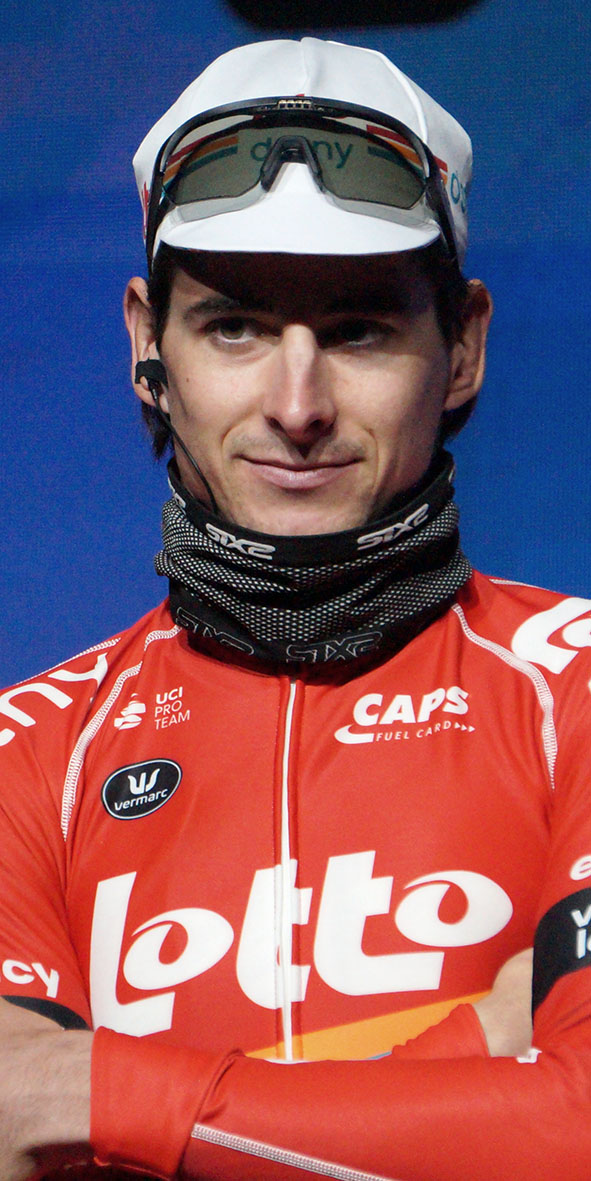
- Cédric Beullens

Personal information
- Born: 27 January 1997 (age 29) Onze-Lieve-Vrouw-Waver, Belgium
- Height: 1.9 m (6 ft 3 in)
- Weight: 79 kg (174 lb)

Cycling career
- Sport: Cycling
- Current team: Lotto–Intermarché
- Discipline: Road
- Role: Rider

Amateur teams
- 2016–2019: EFC–Etixx
- 2019: Wanty–Gobert (stagiaire)

Professional teams
- 2020–2021: Sport Vlaanderen–Baloise
- 2022–: Lotto–Soudal

Cédric Beullens (born 27 January 1997) is a Belgian professional racing cyclist, who currently rides for UCI WorldTeam Lotto–Intermarché.

== Major results ==
2014
8th Overall Keizer der Juniores
2015
1st Overall Keizer der Juniores

1st Stage 2

2017
1st Stage 3 Ronde van Vlaams-Brabant
8th Grand Prix de la ville de Pérenchies
2019
1st Stage 2 Ronde van Vlaams-Brabant
2nd Ronde van Vlaanderen Beloften
5th Kattekoers
7th Grand Prix Criquielion
2020
6th Trofeo Playa de Palma
2021
1st Combativity classification, Tour of Belgium
10th Grote Prijs Jef Scherens
2022
4th Memorial Rik Van Steenbergen
2023
3rd Omloop van het Houtland
7th Classic Brugge–De Panne
7th Tour of Leuven
8th Kampioenschap van Vlaanderen
9th Brussels Cycling Classic
9th Gooikse Pijl
2024
9th Clásica Jaén Paraíso Interior
9th Tour of Leuven

=== Grand Tour general classification results timeline ===
Grand Tour	2022	2023	2024
Giro d'Italia	—	—	—
Tour de France	—	—	121
Vuelta a España	107	—	—

Legend
—	Did not compete
DNF	Did not finish
