= Samuele Zoccarato =

Italian cyclist

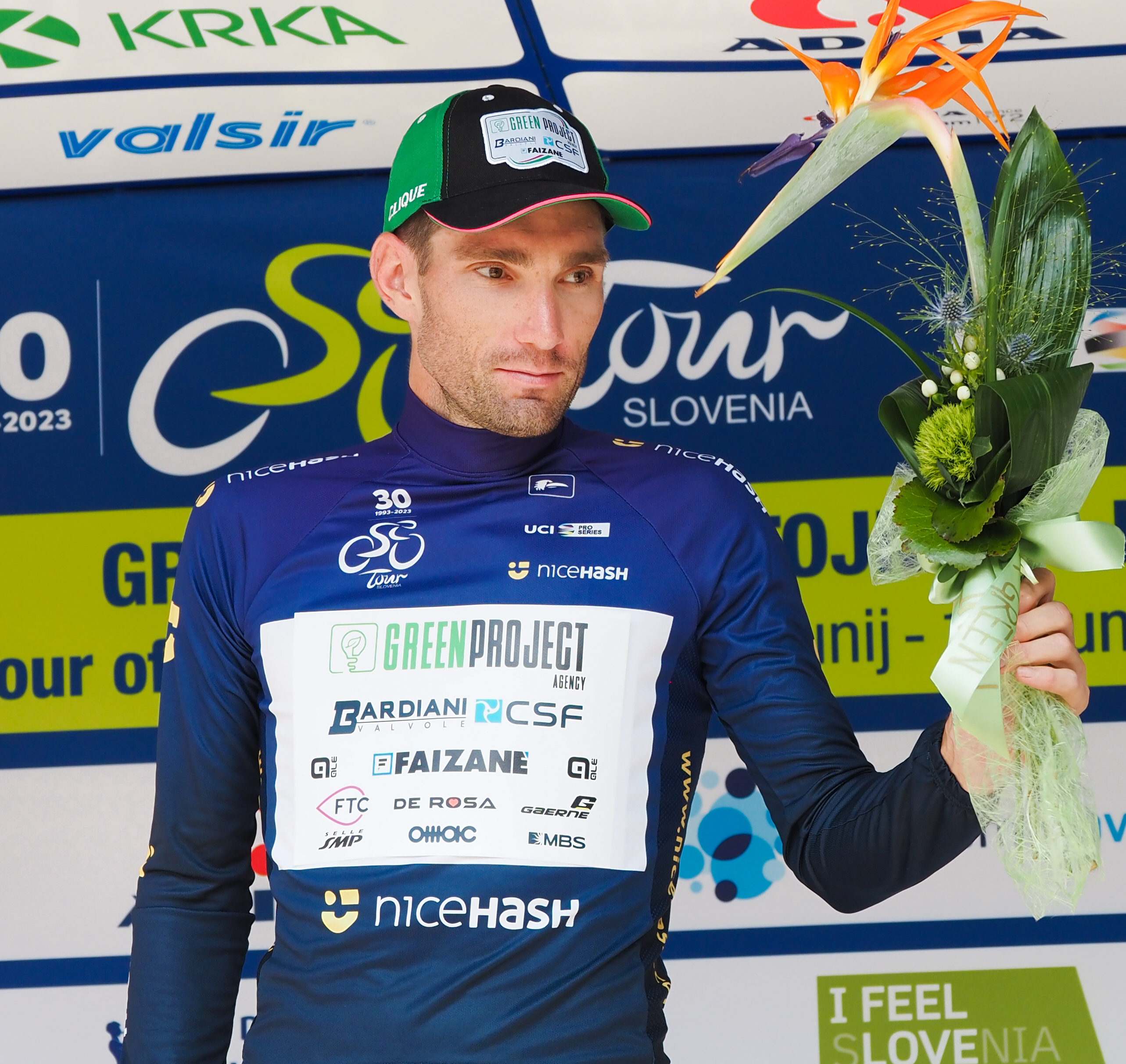
- Zoccarato at the 2023 Tour of Slovenia

Personal information
- Born: 9 January 1998 (age 28) Camposampiero, Italy
- Height: 1.83 m (6 ft 0 in)
- Weight: 74 kg (163 lb)

Cycling career
- Sport: Cycling
- Current team: MBH Bank CSB Telecom Fort
- Disciplines: Road; Gravel
- Role: Rider

Amateur teams
- 2012: Giorgione Aliseo Group
- 2013: Fiumicello
- 2016: Villadose Angelo Gomme
- 2017: Cyberteam–VC Breganze
- 2018: General Store Bottoli Zardini

Professional teams
- 2019: IAM–Excelsior
- 2020: Team Colpack–Ballan
- 2021–2024: Bardiani–CSF–Faizanè
- 2025: Team Polti VisitMalta
- 2026–: MBH Bank CSB Telecom Fort

Samuele Zoccarato (born 9 January 1998) is an Italian racing cyclist, who currently rides for UCI ProTeam MBH Bank CSB Telecom Fort.

== Major results ==
2018
1st Ruota d'Oro
4th Gran Premio Industrie del Marmo
2019
1st Mountains classification, Tour du Jura Cycliste
5th Piccolo Giro di Lombardia
2021
3rd Road race, National Road Championships
7th Trofeo Matteotti
9th GP Slovenian Istria
2023
1st Mountains classification, Tour of Slovenia
1st Mountains classification, Volta a la Comunitat Valenciana
2024
1st National Gravel Championships
1st Mountains classification, Tour of Austria
2025
1st Tour de la Mirabelle
2026
1st Gran Premio Santa Rita

=== Grand Tour general classification results timeline ===
Grand Tour	2021	2022	2023
Giro d'Italia	105	DNF	DNF
Tour de France	—	—	
Vuelta a España	—	—	

Legend
—	Did not compete
DNF	Did not finish
