= Follet =

Follet may refer to:

Surname:

- Michel Follet (born 1959), Flemish radio and TV host and a film critic
- Nelson le Follet, stage name of Bartolomeo Viganego (1859–1943), Italian illusionist, impersonator and acrobat
- René Follet (1931–2020), Belgian illustrator, comics writer and artist
- Simone Follet (1935–2021), French epigrapher and scholar of Roman Athens

Given name:

- Dewey Follet Bartlett (1919–1979), American politician, 19th Governor of Oklahoma from 1967 to 1971
- Clyde Follet Seavey (1904–1991), American artist

Feu:

- Feu follet the Brazilian equivalent of the will-o'-the-wisp
- Le Feu follet (The Fire Within), a 1963 French drama film directed by Louis Malle
- Le feu follet (novel), a 1931 novel by the French writer Pierre Drieu La Rochelle

Other:

- Le Follet, Parisian fashion magazine, published weekly from November 1829 to 1892
- French submarine Follet (Q7), early submarine built for the French Navy at the beginning of the 20th century

== See also ==
- Follett (disambiguation)
- Fallet (disambiguation)
- Fauillet
- Feuillet (disambiguation)
