= Andrea Raccagni =

Italian cyclist (born 2004)

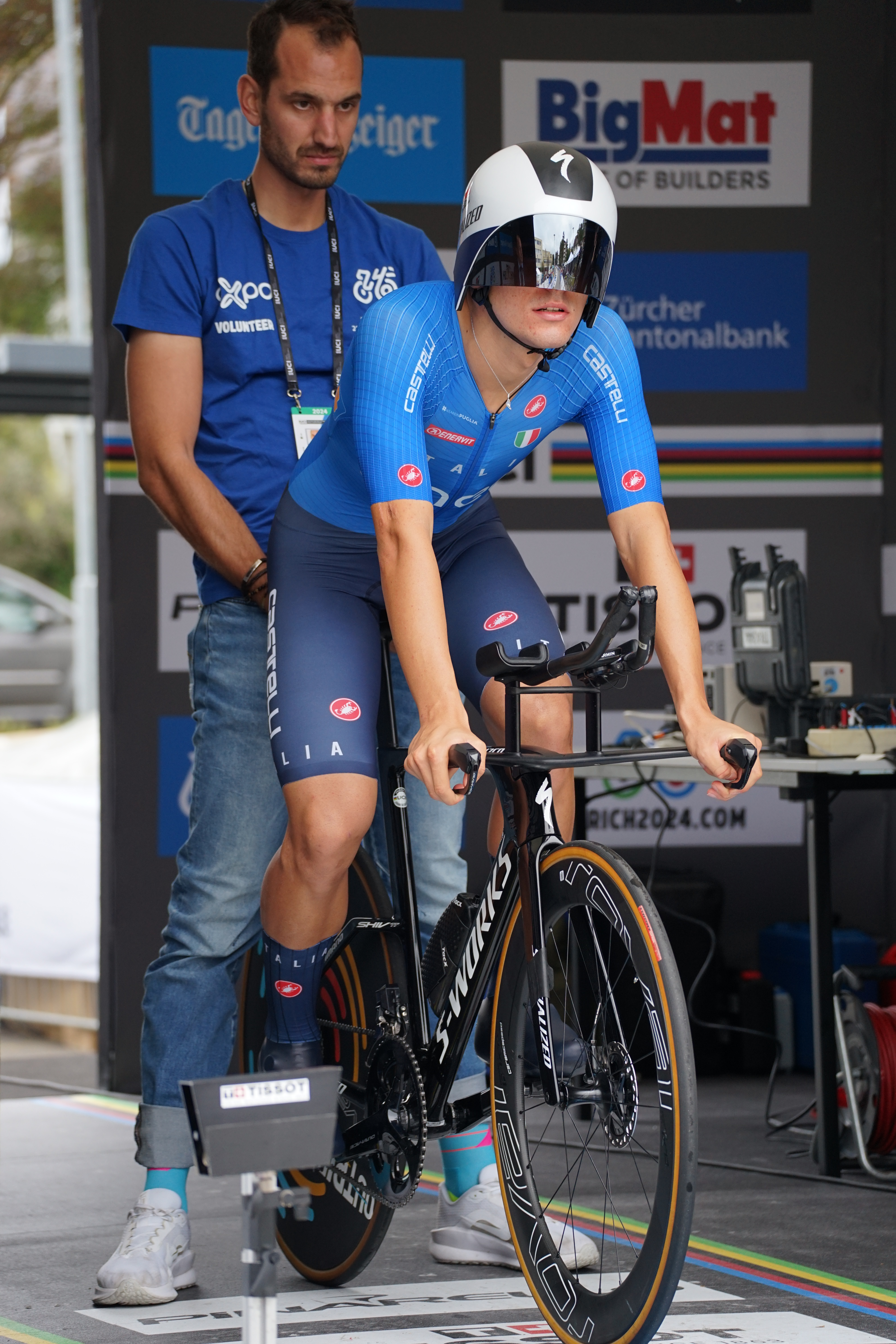
- Raccagni in 2024

Personal information
- Full name: Andrea Raccagni Noviero
- Born: 26 January 2004 (age 22) Genoa, Italy
- Height: 1.83 m (6 ft 0 in)
- Weight: 73 kg (161 lb)

Cycling career
- Sport: Cycling
- Current team: Soudal–Quick-Step
- Discipline: Road
- Role: Rider

Amateur team
- 2021–2022: Work Service Speedy Bike

Professional teams
- 2023–2024: Soudal–Quick-Step Devo Team
- 2025–: Soudal–Quick-Step

Andrea Raccagni Noviero (born 26 January 2004) is an Italian professional road cyclist, who currently rides for UCI WorldTeam Soudal–Quick-Step.

== Career ==
He rode for amateur local team Work Service Speedy Bike in 2021 and 2022. He won the European junior title in Anadia, Portugal in the team pursuit and followed that up with winning at the 2022 UCI Junior Track Cycling World Championships in Tel Aviv, Israel in the same discipline.

He rode the 2023 season with Soudal–Quick-Step Devo Team and finished in third place at Omloop Mandel-Leie-Schelde. In 2024, he became Italian national U23 time trial champion. That year, he finished in third place at Brussel-Opwijk, Le Tour des 100 Communes and Gent–Wevelgem U23. Later on in the season, had a second place finish in the opening time trial at Giro Next Gen, he also acted as a lead-out man for double stage winner Paul Magnier. He finished seventh in the time trial at the U23 European Championships. He finished 13th in the time trial at the 2024 UCI U23 World Championships in Zurich.

In October 2024 he signed a three-year contract with Soudal–Quick-Step.

== Personal life ==
He is from Chiavari.

== Major results ==
2022
1st Gran Premio Eccellenze Valli del Soligo (TTT)
2023
2nd Textielprijs Vichte
2nd Costa dei Trulli
3rd Dorpenomloop Rucphen
3rd Omloop Mandel-Leie-Schelde
3rd Zuidkempense Pijl
3rd GP Stad Torhout
4th Grote Prijs Rik Van Looy
10th Paris–Tours Espoirs
2024
1st Time trial, National Under-23 Road Championships
3rd Gent–Wevelgem U23
3rd Tour des 100 Communes
3rd Brussel-Opwijk
7th Time trial, UEC European Under-23 Road Championships
2025
4th Coppa Bernocchi
7th Overall Okolo Slovenska
7th Coppa Agostoni
2026
3rd Coppa Agostoni
4th Overall Deutschland Tour
6th Overall Tour Down Under

1st Young rider classification
