= Descalzi =

Descalzi is an Italian surname. It is pronounced [deˈskaltsi]. Notable people with the surname include:

- Cayetano Descalzi (born Gaetano Descalzi) (1809–1886), Italian painter and engraver active in Argentina
- Claudio Descalzi (born 1955), Italian businessman in the energy sector
- Giuseppe Gaetano Descalzi (1767-1855), Genoese furniture maker
- Nicolás Descalzi, the namesake of Nicolás Descalzi in Buenos Aires, Argentina
