= Forrest Hibbits =

American fine artist and watercolorist (1905–1996)

- Born: October 9, 1905; Lompoc, California
- Died: July 6, 1996 (aged 90)
- Known for: Watercolor painting, Illustration

Forrest Hibbits (born 1905) was a mid-century fine artist and watercolorist. He was born in Lompoc, California, on October 9, 1905. He left the Hibbits family ranch to attend the California College of Arts and Crafts and graduated ca. 1927. He taught at the San Francisco Art Institute. Hibbits was married to fellow artist Marie Jaans, whom he met in North Beach. He created a poster for the 1939 World's Fair (Golden Gate International Exposition on Treasure Island in San Francisco. Hibbits worked as a commercial illustrator along with fellow artist Clyde Follet Seavey at Patterson and Sullivan in San Francisco. Marie and Forrest moved from San Francisco back to the Lompoc/Santa Ynez Valley area in the 1940s after Hibbits joined the Army, and lived there for the rest of their lives. Later, he taught at the Santa Barbara Art Institute. Hibbits worked in many styles, including nudes, representational landscapes, surreal scenes, semi-abstract and abstract works. He sold his work in a small store front adjacent to his studio in Buellton called "La Petite Gallerie" from the 1950s until the late 1980s.

== Exhibitions ==
- San Francisco Museum of Art
- De Young Museum
- Oakland Museum of Art
- Palace of the Legion of Honor

== Permanent collections ==
- Santa Barbara Museum of Art
- Long Beach Museum of Art
