= Feuillet =

Feuillet may refer to:

- Feuillet, Panama
- Catherine Feuillet (born 1965), French geneticist
- Louis Éconches Feuillée (sometimes spelled Feuillet) (1660–1732), French explorer, astronomer, geographer, and botanist
- Octave Feuillet (1821–1890), French novelist and dramatist
- Raoul Auger Feuillet (c. 1653 – c. 1709), French dance notator, publisher, and choreographer who described Beauchamp–Feuillet notation
- Rémi Feuillet (born 1992), Mauritian judoka
- Tomás Martín Feuillet (1832-1862), Panamanian poet
