= Harry Sweeny =

Australian racing cyclist

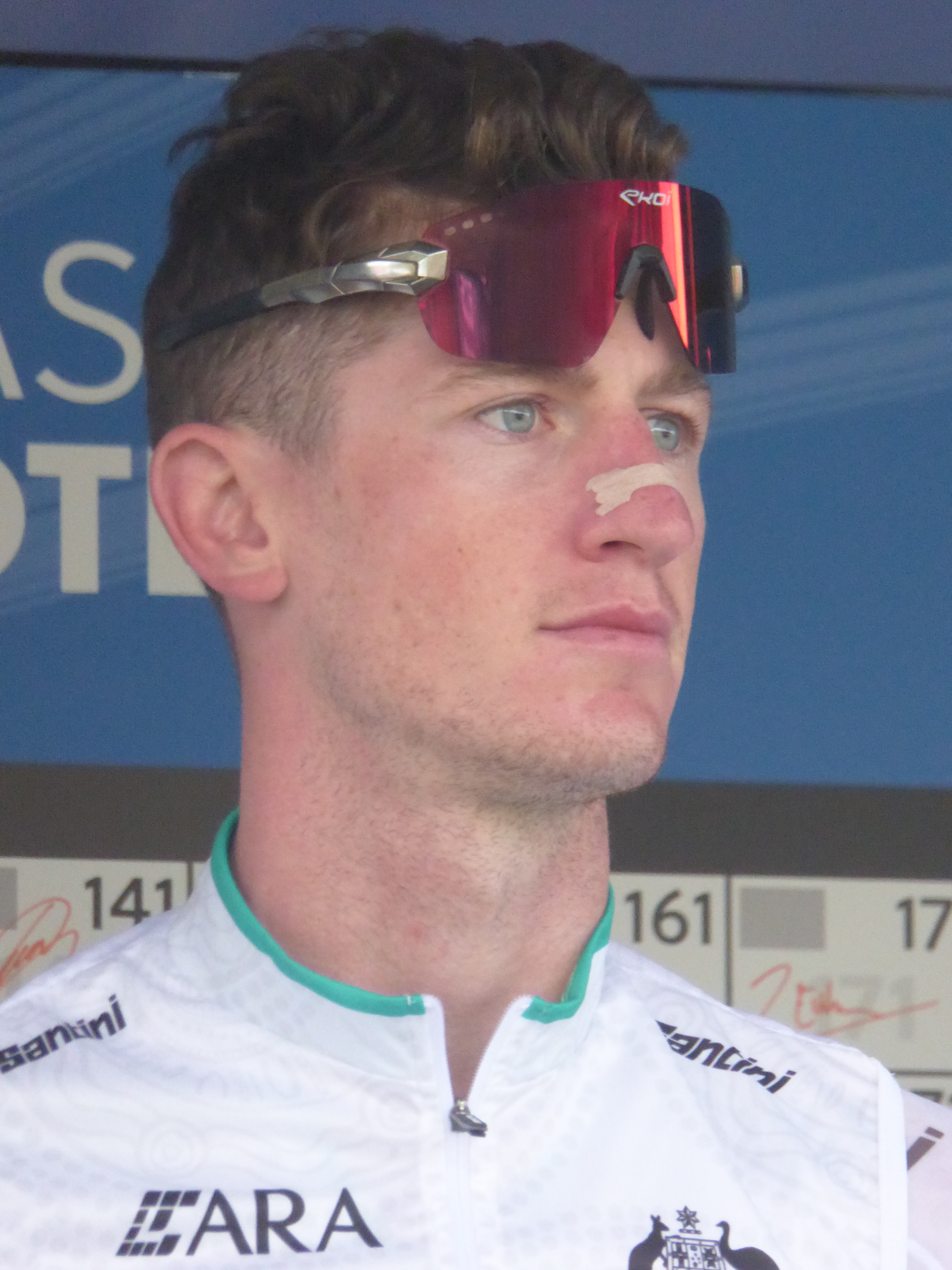
- Sweeny before the 2023 UCI Road World Championships

Personal information
- Full name: Harrison William Sweeny
- Nicknames: Harry, Big Rig
- Born: 9 July 1998 (age 28) Warwick, Queensland
- Height: 186 cm (6 ft 1 in)
- Weight: 74 kg (163 lb)

Cycling career
- Sport: Cycling
- Current team: EF Education–EasyPost
- Discipline: Road
- Role: Rider
- Rider type: All-rounder; Domestique

Amateur team
- 2020: Lotto–Soudal U23

Professional teams
- 2017–2018: Mitchelton Scott
- 2019: EvoPro Racing
- 2021–2023: Lotto–Soudal
- 2024–: EF Education–EasyPost

Harrison William Sweeny (born 9 July 1998) is an Australian professional cyclist, who currently rides for UCI WorldTeam EF Education–EasyPost.

== Early life ==
Sweeny grew up in Warwick, Queensland. As a child he showed a passion for sport. Initially a swimmer, in which he attended state titles, Sweeny transitioned to the triathlon and at one point balanced schoolwork with 20 hours of triathlon training each week. He competed in state and national-level junior triathlons, in which cycling was his strongest discipline. Along with his triathlon coach recognising his talent for cycling, a hip stress fracture in his early teens contributed to Sweeny deciding to pursue cycling.

His first road cycling season was 2015, after which he participated in the local sports institute's cycling program.

== Career ==
=== Early years ===
In 2015, while in year 12, Sweeny came 47th in the junior individual time trial at the Road World Championships.

In 2016, Sweeny became national and continental junior champion in the time trial. He finished fifth in the continental junior road race. He finished tenth in the men's junior road race, and 20th in the men's junior time trial at the 2016 UCI Road World Championships.

In 2017, Sweeny was named as one of eight riders in the newly-formed UCI continental team Mitchelton-Scott. He continued to race for the team in the 2018 season. Sweeny came tenth overall in the general classification in the Tour de Langkawi. He held third place on general classification from stages three to six, before crashing on the final day, and losing his podium place. His best result on a stage was fourth on the third stage.

In early 2018, Sweeny was hit by a car, damaging his knee. He also suffered from a crash in Trofeo Piva and did not finish the race. He abandoned Trofeo Città di San Vendemiano with suspected rotavirus.

Sweeny joined the EvoPro Racing team ahead of the 2019 season. He won stage three of the Rhône-Alpes Isère Tour.

Sweeny rode for the Lotto-Soudal U23, a development team for Lotto-Soudal, in 2020. He won Piccolo Giro di Lombardia, the U23 version of Giro il Lombardia. He signed for the UCI WorldTour team Lotto-Soudal for the 2021 and 2022 seasons.

=== 2021-present (UCI WorldTour, EF Education-Easy Post) ===
In 2021, Sweeny took ninth in stage five of the Critérium du Dauphiné.

He made his Tour de France debut later that season, acting in the role as a lead-out rider for sprinter Caleb Ewan. After Ewan crashed out of the race, Sweeny was able to individually compete for stage wins for his team. On stage twelve, Sweeny was part of the breakaway, and attacked with around 40 kilometeres to go. He attacked again, with around fifteen kilometres to go, but Nils Pollit countered, and stayed solo, winning the stage. Sweeny lost the sprint to Imanol Erviti. His achievement of third was his first podium of the season.

Sweeny finished eighth in the time trial on fourth stage of the Tour of Luxembourg.

At the 2021 Paris-Roubaix, which was rearranged due to COVID-19 pandemic, Sweeny was in the early breakaway, and worked for his teammate Florian Vermeersch, who finished second. Sweeny finished 39th overall, almost ten minutes after the winner, Sonny Colbrelli.

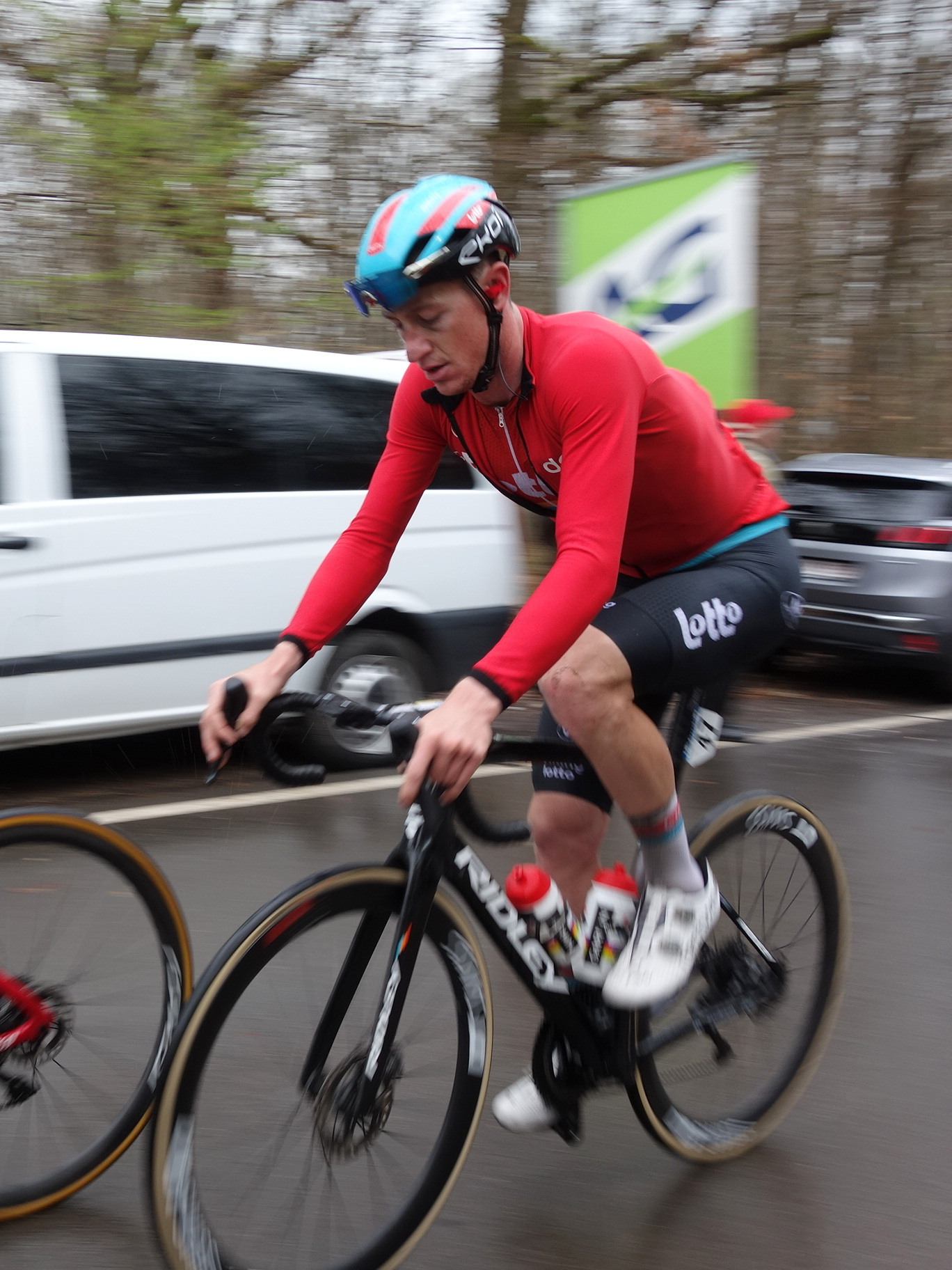
Sweeny in a chasing group during the finale of Liège-Bastogne-Liège, 2023.

One of the primary goals for Sweeny ahead of the 2022 season was to be a part of Caleb Ewan's leadout. At the Tour des Alpes-Maritimes, Ewan won the first stage. In Tirreno-Adriatico, Ewan won stage three, and Sweeny came eleventh overall in the youth classification.

In 2022, Sweeny came second on the final stage of the Tour de l'Ain, beating George Bennett in a two-man sprint. He also came eighth overall in the points classification. Sweeny was selected for the 2022 Vuelta a España. He was part of a six-man breakaway on stage seven, sprinting to a fifth place behind Jesús Herrada. Sweeny said of his result "A fifth place is pretty disappointing [...] I started the sprint in a good position but pretty soon, I realised that I didn't have the best of legs." He did not start stage ten due to testing positive for COVID-19.

Sweeny came tenth in the Trofeo Serra de Tramuntana in 2023. He came sixth on the second stage of the Tour de Romandie.

Ahead of the 2024 season, Sweeny signed with EF Education-Easy Post. He said of his move to the team "the thing [...] that is really attractive to me is the open-mindedness [...] the team will take into account how the riders perceive things and how that affects performance as opposed to having a really traditional mindset."

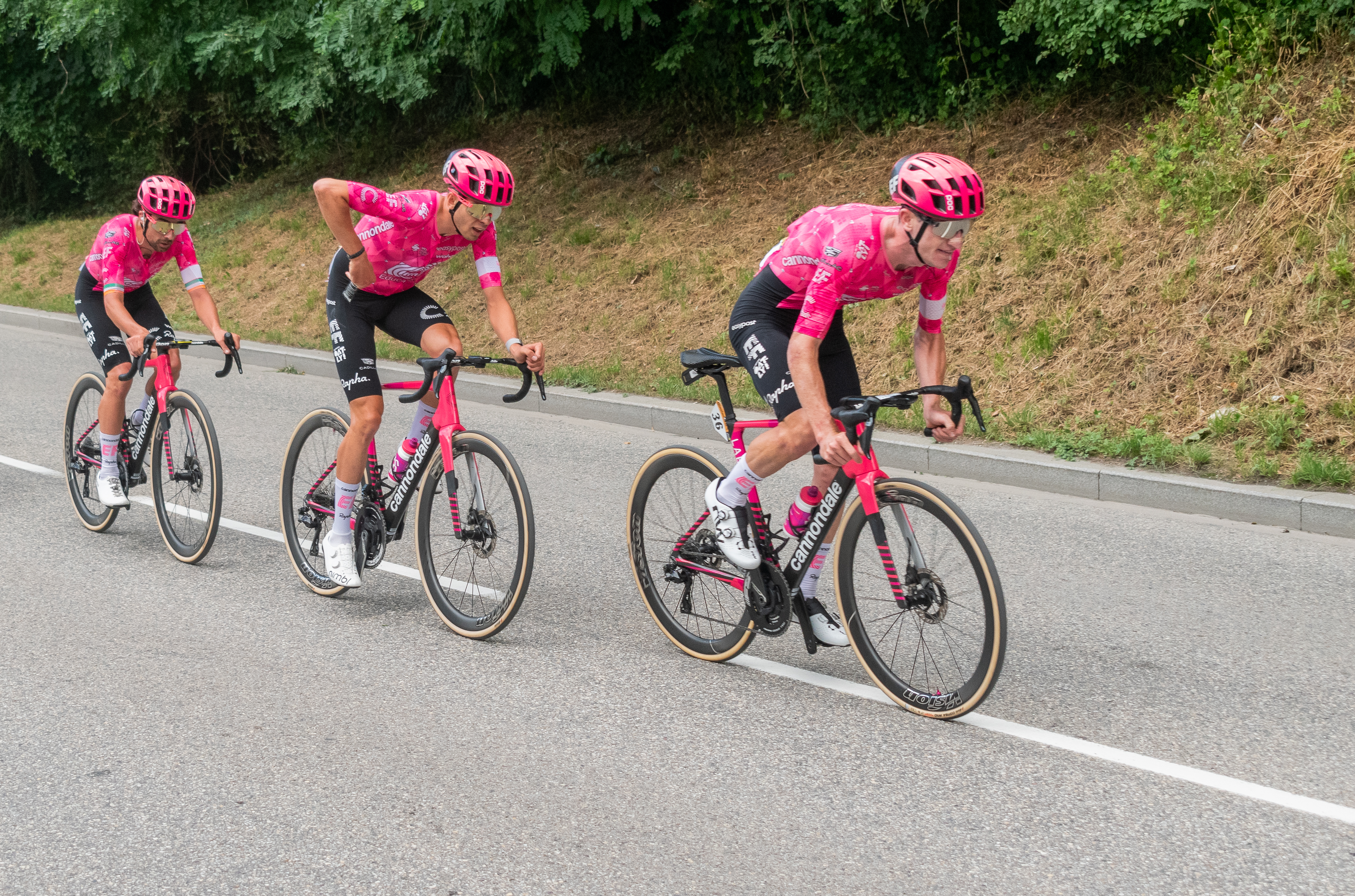
Healy, Baudin, and Sweeny during 18th stage of Tour de France 2025

In the 2025 Tour de France, Sweeny played a crucial role in helping Ben Healy take the yellow jersey on the tenth stage. Sweeny, Alex Baudin, and Neilson Powless made it into the breakaway, and rode for Healy. Sweeny rode until the Col de Guéry, before he was dropped. Stage 20 saw Sweeny make it into the breakaway with twelve other riders. He attacked out of the group with around 50 kilometres left in the stage, and was solo for 30 kilometres, before he was caught at the bottom of the Côte de Longeville. He took tenth in the sprint. He received the combativity award for the stage.

In January 2026, Sweeny came third overall in the Tour Down Under, with his best result being a ninth place on the second stage.

Sweeny underwent surgery to remove inflamed plica in his left knee. The injury first flared after Milan-Sanremo, with Sweeny commenting that "I wasn’t able to race. I've been able to do a few days of good training, but then it would come back, and then I would be good for a few more days. Honestly, it's been really quite difficult. [...] it’s been a difficult period for me to figure it out and keep my head in the right space." He hoped to recover in time to have a chance at being selected for the Tour de France.

== Personal life ==
Sweeny is neurodivergent; he was diagnosed with autism as an adult. He is currently the only active UCI WorldTeam rider to publicly announce this.

Sweeny has a YouTube channel where he makes videos about life as a pro-cyclist, training, and cooking.

== Major results ==
2015
9th Road race, Oceania Junior Road Championships
2016
Oceania Junior Road Championships

1st Time trial
5th Road race

1st Time trial, National Junior Road Championships
3rd Overall Driedaagse van Axel
4th Overall Tour des Portes du Pays d'Othe
10th Road race, UCI Junior Road World Championships
2017
1st Stage 1a (TTT) Toscana-Terra di Ciclismo
2018
10th Overall Tour de Langkawi
2019
1st Stage 3 Rhône-Alpes Isère Tour
2020
1st Piccolo Giro di Lombardia
2023
4th Overall Vuelta a Castilla y León
10th Trofeo Serra de Tramuntana
2024
7th Overall Tour de Luxembourg
2025
Combativity award Stage 20 Tour de France
2026
3rd Overall Tour Down Under

=== Grand Tour general classification results timeline ===
Grand Tour	2021	2022	2023	2024	2025
Giro d'Italia	—	—	—	—	—
Tour de France	85	—	—	—	35
Vuelta a España	—	DNF	—	78	—

Legend
—	Did not compete
DNF	Did not finish
