= Chiavari Castle =

Ancient fortification in Genoa, Italy

Coordinates: 44°19′08″N 9°19′35″E

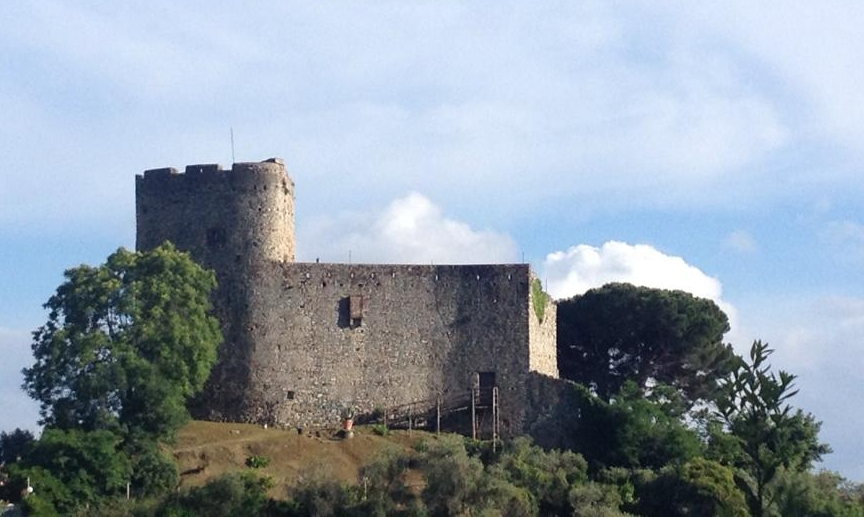
Chiavari Castle

Chiavari Castle (Castello di Chiavari) is an ancient fortification in Chiavari, Province of Genoa, in Italy.

== History ==
The castle was built after the convention of perpetual league signed on 1138 between Genoa and Fieschi. The construction started on 1140 and finished probably on 1147. It is one of the first castle erected in the Italian Riviera, over a hill dominating and defending a seafaring village, called Clavai, today Chiavari.

In 1172 the castle was besieged by Opizzone Malaspina, while in 1278 it fell into the hands of Moruello and Alberto Fieschi hands, allied for the conquest of the castle, but just for eight days.

During the first half of the 14th century it was rebuilt several times because of violent battles between the Guelfs and Ghibellines and in that century the village was further fortified by a heavy surrounding wall accessible through seven doors and defended by fourteen towers. Nowadays it is quite easy to see the ruins of the ancient wall of the ancient village of Chiavari.
