= 2026 Tour Down Under =

Cycling race

2026 UCI World Tour, race 1 of 36
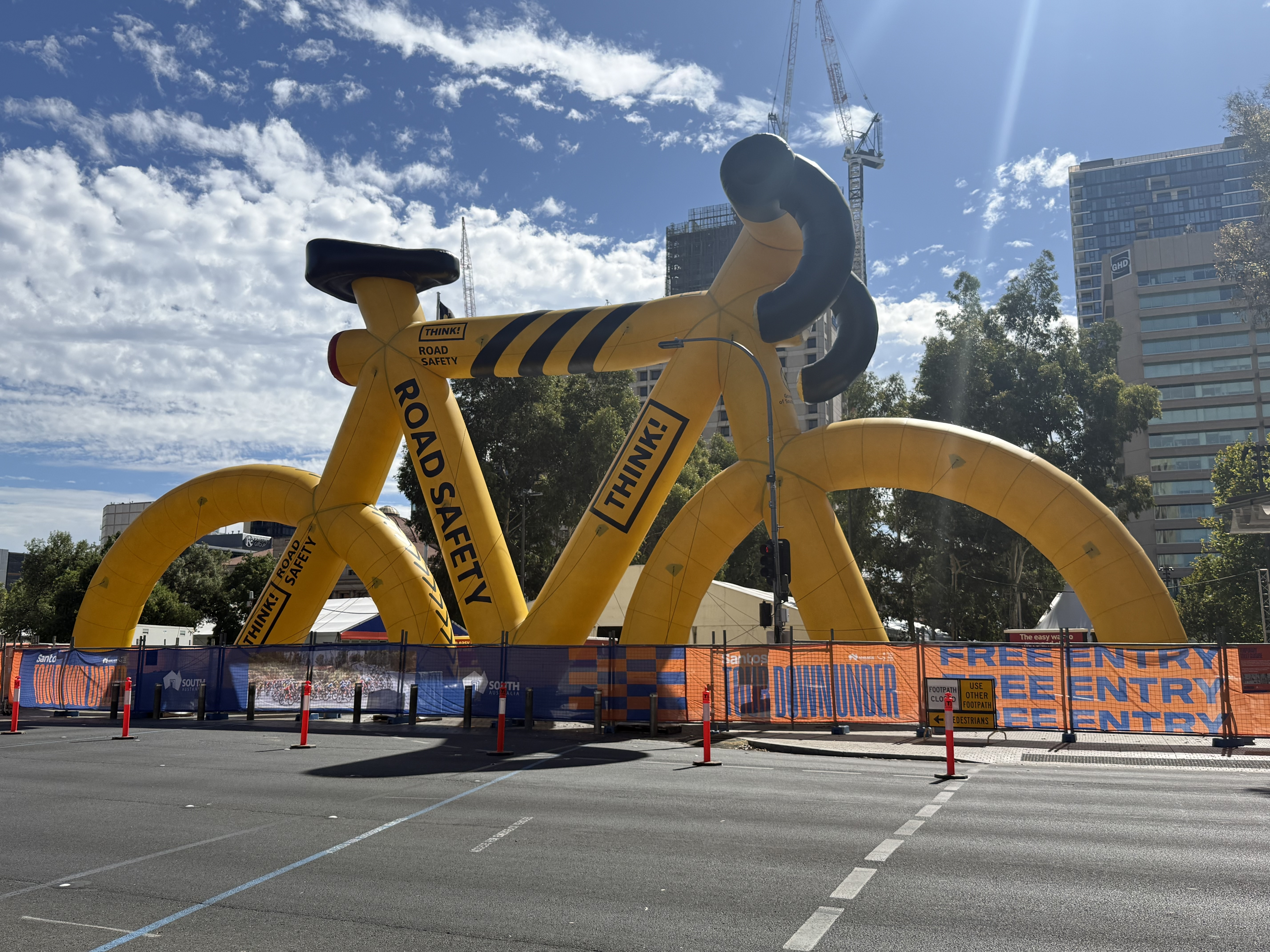
- Tour Village in Victoria Square, Adelaide, featuring a giant yellow inflatable bike

Race details
- Dates: 20–25 January 2026
- Stages: 5 + Prologue
- Distance: 713.7 km (443.5 mi)
- Winning time: 16h 44' 54"

Results
| Jersey awarded to the overall winner | Winner | Jay Vine (AUS) | (UAE Team Emirates XRG) |
| | Second | Mauro Schmid (SUI) | (Team Jayco–AlUla) |
| | Third | Harry Sweeny (AUS) | (EF Education–EasyPost) |
| Jersey awarded to the mountains classification winner | Mountains | Martin Urianstad (NOR) | (Uno-X Mobility) |
| Jersey awarded to the young rider classification winner | Young rider | Andrea Raccagni Noviero (ITA) | (Soudal–Quick-Step) |
| Jersey awarded to the sprints classification winner | Sprints | Tobias Lund Andresen (DEN) | (Decathlon CMA CGM) |
| | Team | (Australia) Team Jayco–AlUla | |

The 2026 Tour Down Under was a road cycling stage race that was held between 20 and 25 January 2026. It took place in and around Adelaide and South Australia. It was the 26th edition of the Tour Down Under and the first race of the 2026 UCI World Tour.

Despite riding with a broken wrist following a collision with a kangaroo on stage 5, the race was won by Australian rider Jay Vine of UAE Team Emirates XRG for the second time.

== Teams ==
All eighteen UCI WorldTeams, one UCI ProTeam, and the Australian national team participated in the race.

UCI WorldTeams

- Alpecin–Premier Tech
- Decathlon CMA CGM
- EF Education–EasyPost
- Groupama–FDJ United
- INEOS Grenadiers
- Lidl–Trek
- Lotto–Intermarché
- Movistar Team
- NSN Cycling Team
- Red Bull–Bora–Hansgrohe
- Soudal–Quick-Step
- Team Bahrain Victorious
- Team Jayco–AlUla
- Team Picnic–PostNL
- Visma–Lease a Bike
- UAE Team Emirates XRG
- Uno-X Mobility
- XDS Astana Team

UCI ProTeams

- Tudor Pro Cycling Team

National Teams

- ARA Australian Cycling Team

== Route ==
Owing to predicted temperatures of 43 °C (109 °F) and an "Extreme" fire warning, stage 4 to Willunga Hill was shortened from its original distance of 176 km (109 mi) to 130.8 km (81.3 mi).

Stage characteristics and winners
| Stage | Date | Route | Distance | Type | Winner |
|---|---|---|---|---|---|
| P | 20 January | Adelaide to Adelaide | 3.6 km (2.2 mi) | Individual time trial | Samuel Watson (GBR) |
| 1 | 21 January | Tanunda to Tanunda | 120.6 km (74.9 mi) | Hilly stage | Tobias Lund Andresen (DEN) |
| 2 | 22 January | Norwood to Uraidla | 148.1 km (92.0 mi) | Hilly stage | Jay Vine (AUS) |
| 3 | 23 January | Adelaide to Nairne | 140.8 km (87.5 mi) | Hilly stage | Sam Welsford (AUS) |
| 4 | 24 January | Brighton to Willunga Hill | ~~176 km (109 mi)~~ 130.8 km (81.3 mi) | Hilly stage | Ethan Vernon (GBR) |
| 5 | 25 January | Stirling to Stirling | 169.8 km (105.5 mi) | Hilly stage | Matthew Brennan (GBR) |
| Total | | | 713.7 km (443.5 mi) | | |

== Stages ==
=== Prologue ===
20 January 2026 — Adelaide to Adelaide, 3.6 km (2 mi) (ITT)

Prologue Result
| Rank | Rider | Team | Time |
|---|---|---|---|
| 1 | Samuel Watson (GBR) | INEOS Grenadiers | 4' 16" |
| 2 | Ethan Vernon (GBR) | NSN Cycling Team | + 1" |
| 3 | Laurence Pithie (NZL) | Red Bull–Bora–Hansgrohe | + 3" |
| 4 | Jay Vine (AUS) | UAE Team Emirates XRG | + 4" |
| 5 | Pierre Gautherat (FRA) | Decathlon CMA CGM | + 5" |
| 6 | Mauro Schmid (SUI) | Team Jayco–AlUla | + 5" |
| 7 | Maikel Zijlaard (NED) | Tudor Pro Cycling Team | + 5" |
| 8 | Tim Torn Teutenberg (GER) | Lidl–Trek | + 5" |
| 9 | Oliver Bleddyn (AUS) | ARA Australian Cycling Team | + 5" |
| 10 | Jensen Plowright (AUS) | Alpecin–Premier Tech | + 7" |

General classification after Prologue
| Rank | Rider | Team | Time |
|---|---|---|---|
| 1 | Samuel Watson (GBR) | INEOS Grenadiers | 4' 16" |
| 2 | Ethan Vernon (GBR) | NSN Cycling Team | + 1" |
| 3 | Laurence Pithie (NZL) | Red Bull–Bora–Hansgrohe | + 3" |
| 4 | Jay Vine (AUS) | UAE Team Emirates XRG | + 4" |
| 5 | Pierre Gautherat (FRA) | Decathlon CMA CGM | + 5" |
| 6 | Mauro Schmid (SUI) | Team Jayco–AlUla | + 5" |
| 7 | Maikel Zijlaard (NED) | Tudor Pro Cycling Team | + 5" |
| 8 | Tim Torn Teutenberg (GER) | Lidl–Trek | + 5" |
| 9 | Oliver Bleddyn (AUS) | ARA Australian Cycling Team | + 5" |
| 10 | Jensen Plowright (AUS) | Alpecin–Premier Tech | + 7" |

=== Stage 1 ===
21 January 2026 — Tanunda to Tanunda, 120.6 km (75 mi)

Stage 1 Result
| Rank | Rider | Team | Time |
|---|---|---|---|
| 1 | Tobias Lund Andresen (DEN) | Decathlon CMA CGM | 2h 42' 41" |
| 2 | Matthew Brennan (GBR) | Visma–Lease a Bike | + 0" |
| 3 | Sam Welsford (AUS) | INEOS Grenadiers | + 0" |
| 4 | Danny van Poppel (NED) | Red Bull–Bora–Hansgrohe | + 0" |
| 5 | Ethan Vernon (GBR) | NSN Cycling Team | + 0" |
| 6 | Liam Walsh (AUS) | ARA Australian Cycling Team | + 0" |
| 7 | Lionel Taminiaux (BEL) | Lotto–Intermarché | + 0" |
| 8 | Casper van Uden (NED) | Team Picnic–PostNL | + 0" |
| 9 | Tim Torn Teutenberg (GER) | Lidl–Trek | + 0" |
| 10 | Luke Lamperti (USA) | EF Education–EasyPost | + 0" |

General classification after Stage 1
| Rank | Rider | Team | Time |
|---|---|---|---|
| 1 | Tobias Lund Andresen (DEN) | Decathlon CMA CGM | 2h 46' 56" |
| 2 | Samuel Watson (GBR) | INEOS Grenadiers | + 1" |
| 3 | Ethan Vernon (GBR) | NSN Cycling Team | + 2" |
| 4 | Maikel Zijlaard (NED) | Tudor Pro Cycling Team | + 4" |
| 5 | Laurence Pithie (NZL) | Red Bull–Bora–Hansgrohe | + 4" |
| 6 | Matthew Brennan (GBR) | Visma–Lease a Bike | + 5" |
| 7 | Jay Vine (AUS) | UAE Team Emirates XRG | + 5" |
| 8 | Pierre Gautherat (FRA) | Decathlon CMA CGM | + 6" |
| 9 | Mauro Schmid (SUI) | Team Jayco–AlUla | + 6" |
| 10 | Tim Torn Teutenberg (GER) | Lidl–Trek | + 6" |

=== Stage 2 ===
22 January 2026 — Norwood to Uraidla, 148.1 km (92.0 mi)

Stage 2 Result
| Rank | Rider | Team | Time |
|---|---|---|---|
| 1 | Jay Vine (AUS) | UAE Team Emirates XRG | 3h 36' 42" |
| 2 | Jhonatan Narváez (ECU) | UAE Team Emirates XRG | + 0" |
| 3 | Mauro Schmid (SUI) | Team Jayco–AlUla | + 58" |
| 4 | Andreas Kron (DEN) | Uno-X Mobility | + 58" |
| 5 | Filippo Zana (ITA) | Soudal–Quick-Step | + 58" |
| 6 | Natnael Tesfatsion (ERI) | Movistar Team | + 58" |
| 7 | Adam Yates (GBR) | UAE Team Emirates XRG | + 58" |
| 8 | Matteo Sobrero (ITA) | Lidl–Trek | + 58" |
| 9 | Harry Sweeny (AUS) | EF Education–EasyPost | + 58" |
| 10 | Marco Brenner (GER) | Tudor Pro Cycling Team | + 58" |

General classification after Stage 2
| Rank | Rider | Team | Time |
|---|---|---|---|
| 1 | Jay Vine (AUS) | UAE Team Emirates XRG | 6h 23' 33" |
| 2 | Jhonatan Narváez (ECU) | UAE Team Emirates XRG | + 6" |
| 3 | Mauro Schmid (SUI) | Team Jayco–AlUla | + 1' 05" |
| 4 | Harry Sweeny (AUS) | EF Education–EasyPost | + 1' 12" |
| 5 | Marco Brenner (GER) | Tudor Pro Cycling Team | + 1' 14" |
| 6 | Andreas Kron (DEN) | Uno-X Mobility | + 1' 16" |
| 7 | Michael Leonard (CAN) | EF Education–EasyPost | + 1' 22" |
| 8 | Andrea Raccagni Noviero (ITA) | Soudal–Quick-Step | + 1' 22" |
| 9 | Adam Yates (GBR) | UAE Team Emirates XRG | + 1' 23" |
| 10 | Anthon Charmig (DEN) | Uno-X Mobility | + 1' 23" |

=== Stage 3 ===
23 January 2026 — Adelaide to Nairne, 140.8 km (87.5 mi)

Stage 3 Result
| Rank | Rider | Team | Time |
|---|---|---|---|
| 1 | Sam Welsford (AUS) | INEOS Grenadiers | 3h 26' 43" |
| 2 | Tobias Lund Andresen (DEN) | Decathlon CMA CGM | + 0" |
| 3 | Lewis Bower (NZL) | Groupama–FDJ United | + 0" |
| 4 | Jake Stewart (GBR) | NSN Cycling Team | + 0" |
| 5 | Aaron Gate (NZL) | XDS Astana Team | + 0" |
| 6 | Žak Eržen (SLO) | Team Bahrain Victorious | + 0" |
| 7 | Finn Fisher-Black (NZL) | Red Bull–Bora–Hansgrohe | + 0" |
| 8 | Matthew Fox (AUS) | Lotto–Intermarché | + 0" |
| 9 | Anthon Charmig (DEN) | Uno-X Mobility | + 0" |
| 10 | Jensen Plowright (AUS) | Alpecin–Premier Tech | + 0" |

General classification after Stage 3
| Rank | Rider | Team | Time |
|---|---|---|---|
| 1 | Jay Vine (AUS) | UAE Team Emirates XRG | 9h 50' 16" |
| 2 | Jhonatan Narváez (ECU) | UAE Team Emirates XRG | + 6" |
| 3 | Mauro Schmid (SUI) | Team Jayco–AlUla | + 1' 05" |
| 4 | Harry Sweeny (AUS) | EF Education–EasyPost | + 1' 12" |
| 5 | Marco Brenner (GER) | Tudor Pro Cycling Team | + 1' 14" |
| 6 | Andreas Kron (DEN) | Uno-X Mobility | + 1' 16" |
| 7 | Michael Leonard (CAN) | EF Education–EasyPost | + 1' 22" |
| 8 | Andrea Raccagni Noviero (ITA) | Soudal–Quick-Step | + 1' 22" |
| 9 | Adam Yates (GBR) | UAE Team Emirates XRG | + 1' 23" |
| 10 | Anthon Charmig (DEN) | Uno-X Mobility | + 1' 23" |

=== Stage 4 ===
24 January 2026 — Brighton to Willunga Hill, 130.8 km (81.3 mi)

Stage 4 Result
| Rank | Rider | Team | Time |
|---|---|---|---|
| 1 | Ethan Vernon (GBR) | NSN Cycling Team | 2h 56' 30" |
| 2 | Tobias Lund Andresen (DEN) | Decathlon CMA CGM | + 0" |
| 3 | Laurence Pithie (NZL) | Red Bull–Bora–Hansgrohe | + 0" |
| 4 | Brady Gilmore (AUS) | NSN Cycling Team | + 0" |
| 5 | Aaron Gate (NZL) | XDS Astana Team | + 0" |
| 6 | Edoardo Zambanini (ITA) | Team Bahrain Victorious | + 0" |
| 7 | Samuel Watson (GBR) | INEOS Grenadiers | + 0" |
| 8 | Anthon Charmig (DEN) | Uno-X Mobility | + 0" |
| 9 | Andrea Raccagni Noviero (ITA) | Soudal–Quick-Step | + 0" |
| 10 | Pierre Gautherat (FRA) | Decathlon CMA CGM | + 0" |

General classification after Stage 4
| Rank | Rider | Team | Time |
|---|---|---|---|
| 1 | Jay Vine (AUS) | UAE Team Emirates XRG | 12h 46' 46" |
| 2 | Mauro Schmid (SUI) | Team Jayco–AlUla | + 1' 03" |
| 3 | Harry Sweeny (AUS) | EF Education–EasyPost | + 1' 12" |
| 4 | Marco Brenner (GER) | Tudor Pro Cycling Team | + 1' 14" |
| 5 | Andreas Kron (DEN) | Uno-X Mobility | + 1' 16" |
| 6 | Andrea Raccagni Noviero (ITA) | Soudal–Quick-Step | + 1' 19" |
| 7 | Michael Leonard (CAN) | EF Education–EasyPost | + 1' 22" |
| 8 | Anthon Charmig (DEN) | Uno-X Mobility | + 1' 23" |
| 9 | Filippo Zana (ITA) | Soudal–Quick-Step | + 1' 23" |
| 10 | Matteo Sobrero (ITA) | Lidl–Trek | + 1' 27" |

=== Stage 5 ===
The fifth and final stage was disrupted by a crash in the peloton caused by a kangaroo hopping into the road, affecting many riders, including eventual overall winner Jay Vine. It was later revealed that Vine had broken his wrist in the crash.

25 January 2026 — Stirling to Stirling, 169.8 km (105.5 mi)

Stage 5 Result
| Rank | Rider | Team | Time |
|---|---|---|---|
| 1 | Matthew Brennan (GBR) | Visma–Lease a Bike | 3h 58' 08" |
| 2 | Finn Fisher-Black (NZL) | Red Bull–Bora–Hansgrohe | + 0" |
| 3 | Tobias Lund Andresen (DEN) | Decathlon CMA CGM | + 0" |
| 4 | Brady Gilmore (AUS) | NSN Cycling Team | + 0" |
| 5 | Simone Velasco (ITA) | XDS Astana Team | + 0" |
| 6 | Patrick Eddy (AUS) | ARA Australian Cycling Team | + 0" |
| 7 | Samuel Watson (GBR) | INEOS Grenadiers | + 0" |
| 8 | Edoardo Zambanini (ITA) | Team Bahrain Victorious | + 0" |
| 9 | Natnael Tesfatsion (ERI) | Movistar Team | + 0" |
| 10 | Andrea Bagioli (ITA) | Lidl–Trek | + 0" |

General classification after Stage 5
| Rank | Rider | Team | Time |
|---|---|---|---|
| 1 | Jay Vine (AUS) | UAE Team Emirates XRG | 16h 44' 54" |
| 2 | Mauro Schmid (SUI) | Team Jayco–AlUla | + 1' 03" |
| 3 | Harry Sweeny (AUS) | EF Education–EasyPost | + 1' 12" |
| 4 | Marco Brenner (GER) | Tudor Pro Cycling Team | + 1' 14" |
| 5 | Andreas Kron (DEN) | Uno-X Mobility | + 1' 16" |
| 6 | Andrea Raccagni Noviero (ITA) | Soudal–Quick-Step | + 1' 19" |
| 7 | Anthon Charmig (DEN) | Uno-X Mobility | + 1' 23" |
| 8 | Filippo Zana (ITA) | Soudal–Quick-Step | + 1' 23" |
| 9 | Matteo Sobrero (ITA) | Lidl–Trek | + 1' 27" |
| 10 | Ben O'Connor (AUS) | Team Jayco–AlUla | + 1' 28" |

== Classification leadership table ==
Classification leadership by stage
| Stage | Winner | General classification | Sprints classification | Mountains classification | Young rider classification | Most competitive rider(s) | Team classification |
|---|---|---|---|---|---|---|---|
| P | Samuel Watson | Samuel Watson | Not awarded | Not awarded | Michael Leonard | Not awarded | Red Bull–Bora–Hansgrohe |
| 1 | Tobias Lund Andresen | Tobias Lund Andresen | Tobias Lund Andresen | Martin Urianstad | Matthew Brennan | Martin Urianstad | Red Bull–Bora–Hansgrohe |
| 2 | Jay Vine | Jay Vine | Tobias Lund Andresen | Martin Urianstad | Michael Leonard | Pepijn Reinderink | UAE Team Emirates XRG |
| 3 | Sam Welsford | Jay Vine | Tobias Lund Andresen | Martin Urianstad | Michael Leonard | Enzo Paleni | UAE Team Emirates XRG |
| 4 | Ethan Vernon | Jay Vine | Tobias Lund Andresen | Martin Urianstad | Andrea Raccagni Noviero | Matthew Greenwood | UAE Team Emirates XRG |
| 5 | Matthew Brennan | Jay Vine | Tobias Lund Andresen | Martin Urianstad | Andrea Raccagni Noviero | Pascal Eenkhoorn | Team Jayco–AlUla |
| Final | | Jay Vine | Tobias Lund Andresen | Martin Urianstad | Andrea Raccagni Noviero | Not awarded | Team Jayco–AlUla |

== Classification standings ==
Legend
| Denotes the winner of the general classification | Denotes the winner of the sprints classification |
| Denotes the winner of the mountains classification | Denotes the winner of the young rider classification |
| Denotes the winner of the combativity award | |

=== General classification ===
Final general classification (1–10)
| Rank | Rider | Team | Time |
|---|---|---|---|
| 1 | Jay Vine (AUS) | UAE Team Emirates XRG | 16h 44' 54" |
| 2 | Mauro Schmid (SUI) | Team Jayco–AlUla | + 1' 03" |
| 3 | Harry Sweeny (AUS) | EF Education–EasyPost | + 1' 12" |
| 4 | Marco Brenner (GER) | Tudor Pro Cycling Team | + 1' 14" |
| 5 | Andreas Kron (DEN) | Uno-X Mobility | + 1' 16" |
| 6 | Andrea Raccagni Noviero (ITA) | Soudal–Quick-Step | + 1' 19" |
| 7 | Anthon Charmig (DEN) | Uno-X Mobility | + 1' 23" |
| 8 | Filippo Zana (ITA) | Soudal–Quick-Step | + 1' 23" |
| 9 | Matteo Sobrero (ITA) | Lidl–Trek | + 1' 27" |
| 10 | Ben O'Connor (AUS) | Team Jayco–AlUla | + 1' 28" |

=== Sprints classification ===
Final sprints classification (1–10)
| Rank | Rider | Team | Points |
|---|---|---|---|
| 1 | Tobias Lund Andresen (DEN) | Decathlon CMA CGM | 94 |
| 2 | Matthew Brennan (GBR) | Visma–Lease a Bike | 59 |
| 3 | Sam Welsford (AUS) | INEOS Grenadiers | 52 |
| 4 | Finn Fisher-Black (NZL) | Red Bull–Bora–Hansgrohe | 41 |
| 5 | Ethan Vernon (GBR) | NSN Cycling Team | 37 |
| 6 | Brady Gilmore (AUS) | NSN Cycling Team | 32 |
| 7 | Aaron Gate (NZL) | XDS Astana Team | 29 |
| 8 | Anthon Charmig (DEN) | Uno-X Mobility | 22 |
| 9 | Samuel Watson (GBR) | INEOS Grenadiers | 22 |
| 10 | Lewis Bower (NZL) | Groupama–FDJ United | 22 |

=== Mountains classification ===
Final mountains classification (1–10)
| Rank | Rider | Team | Points |
|---|---|---|---|
| 1 | Martin Urianstad (NOR) | Uno-X Mobility | 44 |
| 2 | Pepijn Reinderink (NED) | Soudal–Quick-Step | 24 |
| 3 | Luke Plapp (AUS) | Team Jayco–AlUla | 23 |
| 4 | Matthew Greenwood (AUS) | ARA Australian Cycling Team | 16 |
| 5 | Enzo Paleni (FRA) | Groupama–FDJ United | 14 |
| 6 | Robert Stannard (AUS) | Team Bahrain Victorious | 13 |
| 7 | Pascal Eenkhoorn (NED) | Soudal–Quick-Step | 11 |
| 8 | Jay Vine (AUS) | UAE Team Emirates XRG | 10 |
| 9 | Baptiste Veistroffer (FRA) | Lotto–Intermarché | 9 |
| 10 | Santiago Buitrago (COL) | Team Bahrain Victorious | 7 |

=== Young rider classification ===
Final young rider classification (1–10)
| Rank | Rider | Team | Time |
|---|---|---|---|
| 1 | Andrea Raccagni Noviero (ITA) | Soudal–Quick-Step | 16h 46' 13" |
| 2 | Michael Leonard (CAN) | EF Education–EasyPost | + 2' 14" |
| 3 | Oliver Peace (GBR) | Team Picnic–PostNL | + 4' 39" |
| 4 | Luke Tuckwell (AUS) | Red Bull–Bora–Hansgrohe | + 7' 45" |
| 5 | Pavel Novák (CZE) | Movistar Team | + 9' 05" |
| 6 | Matthew Brennan (GBR) | Visma–Lease a Bike | + 10' 07" |
| 7 | Oscar Chamberlain (AUS) | Decathlon CMA CGM | + 11' 09" |
| 8 | Pietro Mattio (ITA) | Visma–Lease a Bike | + 15' 50" |
| 9 | Hamish McKenzie (AUS) | Team Jayco–AlUla | + 17' 27" |
| 10 | Storm Ingebrigtsen (NOR) | Uno-X Mobility | + 19' 10" |

=== Teams classification ===
Final team classification (1–10)
| Rank | Team | Time |
|---|---|---|
| 1 | (Australia) Team Jayco–AlUla | 50h 19' 11" |
| 2 | (Spain) Movistar Team | + 12" |
| 3 | (Germany) Lidl–Trek | + 29" |
| 4 | (United Arab Emirates) UAE Team Emirates XRG | + 54" |
| 5 | (Australia) ARA Australian Cycling Team | + 1' 10" |
| 6 | (Belgium) Soudal–Quick-Step | + 1' 20" |
| 7 | (United States) EF Education–EasyPost | + 2' 11" |
| 8 | (Norway) Uno-X Mobility | + 3' 43" |
| 9 | (Kazakhstan) XDS Astana Team | + 3' 46" |
| 10 | (Netherlands) Visma–Lease a Bike | + 4' 04" |
