= Gorka Sorarrain =

Spanish cyclist

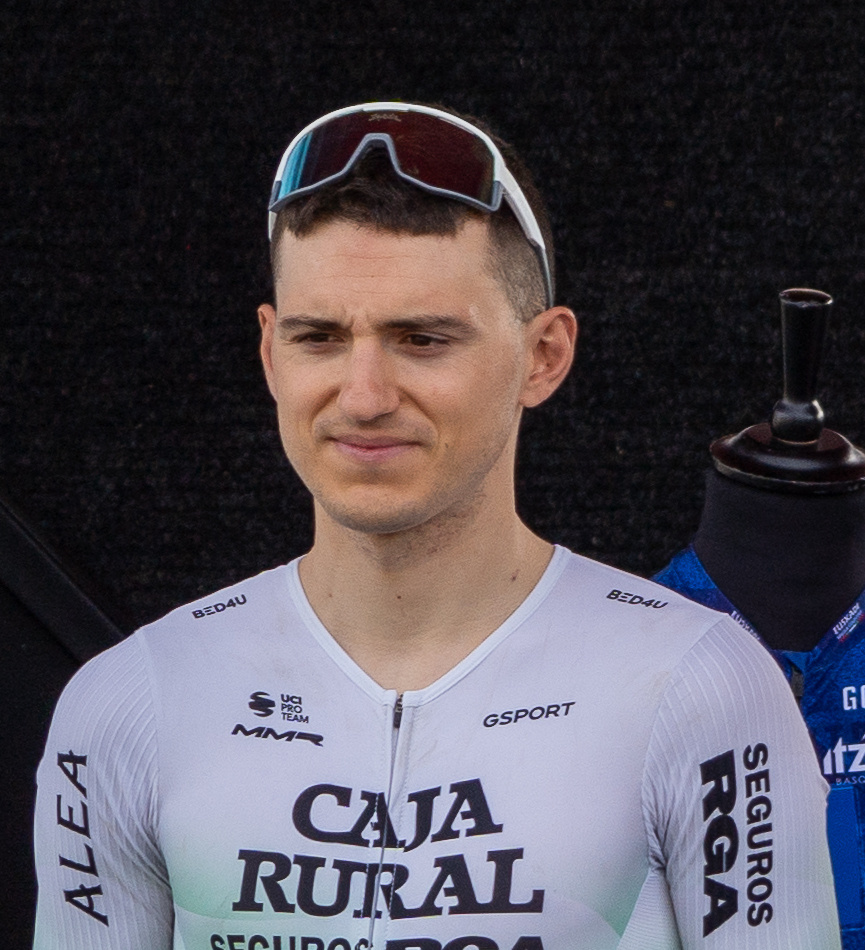
- Sorarrain in 2024

Personal information
- Full name: Gorka Sorarrain Agirrezabala
- Born: 21 May 1996 (age 30) Tolosa, Spain
- Height: 1.85 m (6 ft 1 in)
- Weight: 76 kg (168 lb)

Cycling career
- Sport: Cycling
- Current team: Caja Rural–Seguros RGA
- Discipline: Road
- Role: Rider

Amateur team
- 2022: Baqué Cycling Team

Professional teams
- 2023: BAI–Sicasal–Petro de Luanda
- 2023–: Caja Rural–Seguros RGA

Gorka Sorarrain Agirrezabala (born 21 May 1996) is a Spanish cyclist, who currently rides for UCI ProTeam Caja Rural–Seguros RGA.

Sorarrain played basketball until he was twenty-three, only starting cycling at the beginning of the Covid-19 pandemic on an indoor home trainer. After the end of the lockdown, he signed up for various amateur races in Spain. He finally took part in his first official competitions at the beginning of 2022, at the age of twenty-five. He then joined the Baqué Cycling Team in April, and won two races. In September, he entered his first UCI race, the Giro della Regione Friuli Venezia Giulia. In 2023, Sorarrain was recruited by UCI Continental team BAI–Sicasal–Petro de Luanda, notably placing 5th in the Spanish National Road Race Championships. In August, he stepped up to Caja Rural–Seguros RGA. In 2024, he finished fifth overall in the Tour of Taihu Lake

== Major results ==
2022
1st San Gregorio Saria
1st San Bartolomé Sari Nagusia
2023
5th Road race, National Road Championships
2024
5th Overall Tour of Taihu Lake
2025
10th Circuito de Getxo
2026
7th Overall Deutschland Tour
