= 2026 Deutschland Tour =

2026 UCI ProSeries

Race details
- Dates: 19–23 August 2026
- Stages: 4 + Prologue
- Distance: 742.2 km (461.2 mi)

Results
Jersey awarded to the overall winner	Winner	Isaac del Toro (MEX)	(UAE Team Emirates XRG)
	Second	Louis Barré (FRA)	(Visma–Lease a Bike)
	Third	Marc Hirschi (SWI)	(Tudor Pro Cycling Team)
Jersey awarded to the points classification winner	Points	Isaac del Toro (MEX)	(UAE Team Emirates XRG)
Jersey awarded to the mountains classification winner	Mountains	Miguel Heidemann (GER)	(Rembe / Rad-Net)
Jersey awarded to the young rider classification winner	Young rider	Isaac del Toro (MEX)	(UAE Team Emirates XRG)
Jersey awarded to the team classification winner	Team	(Spain) Movistar Team	

The 2026 Deutschland Tour was a men's road cycling stage race which took place from 19 to 23 August 2026. It was the 40th edition of the Deutschland Tour, which is rated as a 2.Pro event on the 2026 UCI ProSeries calendar.

== Teams ==
Nine of the 18 UCI WorldTeams, five UCI ProTeams, three UCI Continental teams, and one national team made up the 18 teams in the race.

UCI WorldTeams

- Alpecin–Premier Tech
- Team Bahrain Victorious
- Lidl–Trek
- Red Bull–Bora–Hansgrohe
- Movistar Team
- Soudal–Quick-Step
- Team Picnic–PostNL
- Visma–Lease a Bike
- UAE Team Emirates XRG

UCI ProTeams

- Caja Rural–Seguros RGA
- Cofidis
- Team TotalEnergies
- Tudor Pro Cycling Team
- Unibet Rose Rockets

UCI Continental Teams

- Rembe / Rad-Net
- Team Lotto–Kern Haus Outlet Montabaur
- Team Storck–MRW BAU

National Teams

- Germany

== Schedule ==
Stage characteristics and winners
Stage	Date	Route	Distance	Type	Stage winner
P	19 August	Bad Orb	2.6 km (1.6 mi)	Individual time trial	Isaac del Toro (MEX)
1	20 August	Essen to Schwäbisch Hall	215.3 km (133.8 mi)	Hilly stage	Louis Barré (FRA)
2	21 August	Schwäbisch Hall to Offenbach an der Queich	197.0 km (122.4 mi)	Flat stage	Alessio Magagnotti (ITA)
3	22 August	Herxheim to Bad Dürkheim	170.8 km (106.1 mi)	Hilly stage	Giulio Pellizzari (ITA)
4	23 August	Heilbronn	156.5 km (97.2 mi)	Hilly stage	Paul Magnier (FRA)
Total			742.2 km (461.2 mi)		

== Stages ==
=== Prologue ===
19 August 2026 – Bad Orb, 2.6 km (1.6 mi)

Prologue Result
Rank	Rider	Team	Time
1	Isaac del Toro (MEX)	UAE Team Emirates XRG	3' 08"
2	Paul Magnier (FRA)	Soudal–Quick-Step	+ 2"
3	Laurenz Rex (BEL)	Soudal–Quick-Step	+ 5"
4	Marco Haller (AUT)	Tudor Pro Cycling Team	+ 5"
5	Andrea Raccagni (ITA)	Soudal–Quick-Step	+ 6"
6	Benjamin Thomas (FRA)	Cofidis	+ 7"
7	António Morgado (POR)	UAE Team Emirates XRG	+ 7"
8	Giulio Ciccone (ITA)	Lidl–Trek	+ 7"
9	Tibor Del Grosso (NED)	Alpecin–Premier Tech	+ 7"
10	Tobias Müller (GER)	Unibet Rose Rockets	+ 7"

General classification after Prologue
Rank	Rider	Team	Time
1	Isaac del Toro (MEX)	UAE Team Emirates XRG	3' 08"
2	Paul Magnier (FRA)	Soudal–Quick-Step	+ 2"
3	Laurenz Rex (BEL)	Soudal–Quick-Step	+ 5"
4	Marco Haller (AUT)	Tudor Pro Cycling Team	+ 5"
5	Andrea Raccagni (ITA)	Soudal–Quick-Step	+ 6"
6	Benjamin Thomas (FRA)	Cofidis	+ 7"
7	António Morgado (POR)	UAE Team Emirates XRG	+ 7"
8	Giulio Ciccone (ITA)	Lidl–Trek	+ 7"
9	Tibor Del Grosso (NED)	Alpecin–Premier Tech	+ 7"
10	Tobias Müller (GER)	Unibet Rose Rockets	+ 7"

=== Stage 1 ===
20 August 2026 – Bad Orb to Schwäbisch Hall, 215.3 km (133.8 mi)

Stage 1 Result
Rank	Rider	Team	Time
1	Louis Barré (FRA)	Visma–Lease a Bike	5h 15' 09"
2	Isaac del Toro (MEX)	UAE Team Emirates XRG	+ 16"
3	Giulio Ciccone (ITA)	Lidl–Trek	+ 16"
4	Natnael Tesfatsion (ERI)	Movistar Team	+ 16"
5	Edoardo Zambanini (ITA)	Team Bahrain Victorious	+ 16"
6	Bart Lemmen (NED)	Visma–Lease a Bike	+ 16"
7	Marc Hirschi (SWI)	Tudor Pro Cycling Team	+ 22"
8	Tijmen Graat (NED)	Visma–Lease a Bike	+ 24"
9	Mathieu Burgaudeau (FRA)	Team TotalEnergies	+ 24"
10	Max Schachmann (GER)	Soudal–Quick-Step	+ 24"

General classification after Stage 1
Rank	Rider	Team	Time
1	Louis Barré (FRA)	Visma–Lease a Bike	5h 18' 18"
2	Isaac del Toro (MEX)	UAE Team Emirates XRG	+ 9"
3	Giulio Ciccone (ITA)	Lidl–Trek	+ 18"
4	Edoardo Zambanini (ITA)	Team Bahrain Victorious	+ 28"
5	Andrea Raccagni (ITA)	Soudal–Quick-Step	+ 29"
6	Natnael Tesfatsion (ERI)	Movistar Team	+ 30"
7	Benjamin Thomas (FRA)	Cofidis	+ 30"
8	Bart Lemmen (NED)	Visma–Lease a Bike	+ 30"
9	Tibor Del Grosso (NED)	Alpecin–Premier Tech	+ 30"
10	Gorka Sorarrain (ESP)	Caja Rural–Seguros RGA	+ 31"

=== Stage 2 ===
21 August 2026 – Schwäbisch Hall to Offenbach an der Queich, 197.0 km (122.4 mi)

Stage 2 Result
Rank	Rider	Team	Time
1	Alessio Magagnotti (ITA)	Red Bull–Bora–Hansgrohe	4h 40' 13"
2	Paul Magnier (FRA)	Soudal–Quick-Step	+ 0"
3	Iúri Leitão (POR)	Caja Rural–Seguros RGA	+ 0"
4	Max Walscheid (GER)	Lidl–Trek	+ 0"
5	Phil Bauhaus (GER)	Team Bahrain Victorious	+ 0"
6	Tobias Müller (GER)	Unibet Rose Rockets	+ 0"
7	John Degenkolb (GER)	Team Picnic–PostNL	+ 0"
8	Jenthe Biermans (BEL)	Cofidis	+ 0"
9	Henri Uhlig (GER)	Alpecin–Premier Tech	+ 0"
10	Marco Haller (AUT)	Tudor Pro Cycling Team	+ 0"

General classification after Stage 2
Rank	Rider	Team	Time
1	Louis Barré (FRA)	Visma–Lease a Bike	9h 58' 31"
2	Isaac del Toro (MEX)	UAE Team Emirates XRG	+ 6"
3	Giulio Ciccone (ITA)	Lidl–Trek	+ 18"
4	Edoardo Zambanini (ITA)	Team Bahrain Victorious	+ 28"
5	Andrea Raccagni (ITA)	Soudal–Quick-Step	+ 29"
6	Natnael Tesfatsion (ERI)	Movistar Team	+ 30"
7	Benjamin Thomas (FRA)	Cofidis	+ 30"
8	Bart Lemmen (NED)	Visma–Lease a Bike	+ 30"
9	Tibor Del Grosso (NED)	Alpecin–Premier Tech	+ 30"
10	Mathias Vacek (CZE)	Lidl–Trek	+ 31"

=== Stage 3 ===
22 August 2026 – Herxheim to Bad Dürkheim, 170.8 km (106.1 mi)

Stage 3 Result
Rank	Rider	Team	Time
1	Giulio Pellizzari (ITA)	Red Bull–Bora–Hansgrohe	4h 03' 44"
2	Isaac del Toro (MEX)	UAE Team Emirates XRG	+ 0"
3	Marc Hirschi (SWI)	Tudor Pro Cycling Team	+ 34"
4	Senna Remijn (NED)	Alpecin–Premier Tech	+ 49"
5	Andrea Raccagni (ITA)	Soudal–Quick-Step	+ 49"
6	Natnael Tesfatsion (ERI)	Movistar Team	+ 49"
7	Stefano Oldani (ITA)	Caja Rural–Seguros RGA	+ 49"
8	António Morgado (POR)	UAE Team Emirates XRG	+ 49"
9	Mathieu Burgaudeau (FRA)	Team TotalEnergies	+ 49"
10	Florian Stork (GER)	Tudor Pro Cycling Team	+ 49"

General classification after Stage 3
Rank	Rider	Team	Time
1	Isaac del Toro (MEX)	UAE Team Emirates XRG	14h 02' 12"
2	Louis Barré (FRA)	Visma–Lease a Bike	+ 52"
3	Marc Hirschi (SWI)	Tudor Pro Cycling Team	+ 1' 5"
4	Andrea Raccagni (ITA)	Soudal–Quick-Step	+ 1' 21"
5	Natnael Tesfatsion (ERI)	Movistar Team	+ 1' 22"
6	Mathias Vacek (CZE)	Lidl–Trek	+ 1' 23"
7	Gorka Sorarrain (ESP)	Caja Rural–Seguros RGA	+ 1' 23"
8	Max Schachmann (GER)	Soudal–Quick-Step	+ 1' 25"
9	Stefano Oldani (ITA)	Caja Rural–Seguros RGA	+ 1' 25"
10	Giulio Pellizzari (ITA)	Red Bull–Bora–Hansgrohe	+ 1' 26"

=== Stage 4 ===
23 August 2026 – Heilbronn, 156.5 km (97.2 mi)

Stage 4 Result
Rank	Rider	Team	Time
1	Paul Magnier (FRA)	Soudal–Quick-Step	3h 37' 39"
2	Danny van Poppel (NED)	Red Bull–Bora–Hansgrohe	+ 0"
3	Tim Torn Teutenberg (GER)	Lidl–Trek	+ 0"
4	Tibor Del Grosso (NED)	Alpecin–Premier Tech	+ 0"
5	Edoardo Zambanini (ITA)	Team Bahrain Victorious	+ 0"
6	Natnael Tesfatsion (ERI)	Movistar Team	+ 0"
7	Clément Venturini (FRA)	Unibet Rose Rockets	+ 0"
8	Benjamin Thomas (FRA)	Cofidis	+ 0"
9	Alan Jousseaume (FRA)	Team TotalEnergies	+ 0"
10	Tijmen Graat (NED)	Visma–Lease a Bike	+ 0"

General classification after Stage 4
Rank	Rider	Team	Time
1	Isaac del Toro (MEX)	UAE Team Emirates XRG	17h 39' 48"
2	Louis Barré (FRA)	Visma–Lease a Bike	+ 53"
3	Marc Hirschi (SWI)	Tudor Pro Cycling Team	+ 1' 8"
4	Andrea Raccagni (ITA)	Soudal–Quick-Step	+ 1' 24"
5	Mathias Vacek (CZE)	Lidl–Trek	+ 1' 25"
6	Natnael Tesfatsion (ERI)	Movistar Team	+ 1' 25"
7	Gorka Sorarrain (ESP)	Caja Rural–Seguros RGA	+ 1' 26"
8	Stefano Oldani (ITA)	Caja Rural–Seguros RGA	+ 1' 28"
9	Max Schachmann (GER)	Soudal–Quick-Step	+ 1' 28"
10	Edgar Cadena (MEX)	Team Storck–MRW BAU	+ 1' 33"

== Classification leadership table ==
Classification leadership by stage
Stage	Winner	General classification	Points classification	Mountains classification	Young rider classification	Team classification
P	Isaac del Toro	Isaac del Toro	Isaac del Toro	Not awarded	Isaac del Toro	Soudal–Quick-Step
1	Louis Barré	Louis Barré	Isaac del Toro	Miguel Heidemann	Isaac del Toro	Visma–Lease a Bike
2	Alessio Magagnotti	Louis Barré	Isaac del Toro	Ole Theiler	Isaac del Toro	Visma–Lease a Bike
3	Giulio Pellizzari	Isaac del Toro	Isaac del Toro	Miguel Heidemann	Isaac del Toro	Movistar Team
4	Paul Magnier	Isaac del Toro	Isaac del Toro	Miguel Heidemann	Isaac del Toro	Movistar Team
Final		Isaac del Toro	Isaac del Toro	Miguel Heidemann	Isaac del Toro	Movistar Team

== Classification standings ==
Legend
Denotes the winner of the general classification	Denotes the winner of the mountains classification
Denotes the winner of the points classification	Denotes the winner of the young rider classification

=== General classification ===
Final general classification (1–10)
Rank	Rider	Team	Time
1	Isaac del Toro (MEX)	UAE Team Emirates XRG	17h 39' 48"
2	Louis Barré (FRA)	Visma–Lease a Bike	+ 53"
3	Marc Hirschi (SUI)	Tudor Pro Cycling Team	+ 1' 08"
4	Andrea Raccagni (ITA)	Soudal–Quick-Step	+ 1' 24"
5	Mathias Vacek (CZE)	Lidl–Trek	+ 1' 25"
6	Natnael Tesfatsion (ERI)	Lidl–Trek	+ 1' 25"
7	Gorka Sorarrain (ESP)	Caja Rural–Seguros RGA	+ 1' 26"
8	Stefano Oldani (ITA)	Caja Rural–Seguros RGA	+ 1' 28"
9	Max Schachmann (GER)	Soudal–Quick-Step	+ 1' 28"
10	Edgar Cadena (MEX)	Team Storck–MRW BAU	+ 1' 33"

=== Points classification ===
Final points classification (1–10)
Rank	Rider	Team	Points
1	Isaac del Toro (MEX)	UAE Team Emirates XRG	37
2	Paul Magnier (FRA)	Soudal–Quick-Step	35
3	Giulio Pellizzari (ITA)	Red Bull–Bora–Hansgrohe	20
4	Natnael Tesfatsion (ERI)	Movistar Team	17
5	Louis Barré (FRA)	Visma–Lease a Bike	15
6	Alessio Magagnotti (ITA)	Red Bull–Bora–Hansgrohe	15
7	Théo Hébert (FRA)	Team TotalEnergies	15
8	Ben Jochum (GER)	Team Lotto–Kern Haus Outlet Montabaur	14
9	Marc Hirschi (SUI)	Tudor Pro Cycling Team	13
10	Edoardo Zambanini (ITA)	Team Bahrain Victorious	12

=== Mountains classification ===
Final mountains classification (1–10)
Rank	Rider	Team	Points
1	Miguel Heidemann (GER)	Rembe / Rad-Net	17
2	Ben Jochum (GER)	Team Lotto–Kern Haus Outlet Montabaur	10
3	Isaac del Toro (MEX)	UAE Team Emirates XRG	8
4	Ole Theiler (GER)	Rembe / Rad-Net	6
5	Nelson Oliveira (POR)	Movistar Team	4
6	Théo Hébert (FRA)	Team TotalEnergies	3
7	Álvaro Sagrado (ESP)	Team Storck–MRW BAU	3
8	Dominik Röber (GER)	Germany	3
9	Giulio Pellizzari (ITA)	Red Bull–Bora–Hansgrohe	3
10	Ellande Larronde (FRA)	Caja Rural–Seguros RGA	3

=== Young rider classification ===
Final young rider classification (1–10)
Rank	Rider	Team	Time
1	Isaac del Toro (MEX)	UAE Team Emirates XRG	17h 39' 48"
2	Andrea Raccagni (ITA)	Soudal–Quick-Step	+ 1' 24"
3	Mathias Vacek (CZE)	Lidl–Trek	+ 1' 25"
4	Giulio Pellizzari (ITA)	Red Bull–Bora–Hansgrohe	+ 1' 36"
5	Senna Remijn (NED)	Alpecin–Premier Tech	+ 1' 58"
6	António Morgado (POR)	UAE Team Emirates XRG	+ 2' 17"
7	Tijmen Graat (NED)	Visma–Lease a Bike	+ 4' 08"
8	Arno Wallenborn (LUX)	Team Lotto–Kern Haus Outlet Montabaur	+ 5' 24"
9	Edoardo Zambanini (ITA)	Team Bahrain Victorious	+ 6' 44"
10	Henri Uhlig (GER)	Alpecin–Premier Tech	+ 7' 25"

=== Team classification ===
Final team classification (1–10)
Rank	Team	Time
1	(Spain) Movistar Team	53h 04' 56"
2	(Belgium) Soudal–Quick-Step	+ 4' 48"
3	(United Arab Emirates) UAE Team Emirates XRG	+ 4' 52"
4	(Switzerland) Tudor Pro Cycling Team	+ 4' 53"
5	(Belgium) Alpecin–Premier Tech	+ 5' 16"
6	(France) Cofidis	+ 6' 45"
7	(Netherlands) Visma–Lease a Bike	+ 8' 02"
8	(Spain) Caja Rural–Seguros RGA	+ 11' 19"
9	(Germany) Lidl–Trek	+ 11' 42"
10	(France) Team TotalEnergies	+ 14' 43"
