= Giuseppe Gaetano Descalzi =

- Born: 1767; Chiavari
- Died: 1855 (aged 87 or 88)
- Occupation: Furniture maker
- Known for: Chiavari chair

Giuseppe Gaetano Descalzi (1767-1855) was a Genoese furniture maker, best known as the inventor of the Chiavari chair.

Giuseppe Gaetano Descalzi was born in Chiavari in the Republic of Genoa in 1767, the son of a cooper. He was called "il Campanino" ("the bell ringer") because his grandfather was the bell-ringer of the Bacezza church. Descalzi was apprenticed to one of the best master carpenters of Chiavari, and became a master craftsman himself. In 1795 the Descalzi brothers opened a furniture workshop. In 1796 he received a silver medal for two wooden chests of drawers from the Chiavari Società Economica, which had been founded five years earlier by the Marquis Stefano Rivarola. Descalzi introduced the use of a polished slab of San Giacomo slate as a tabletop, a low-cost alternative to marble.

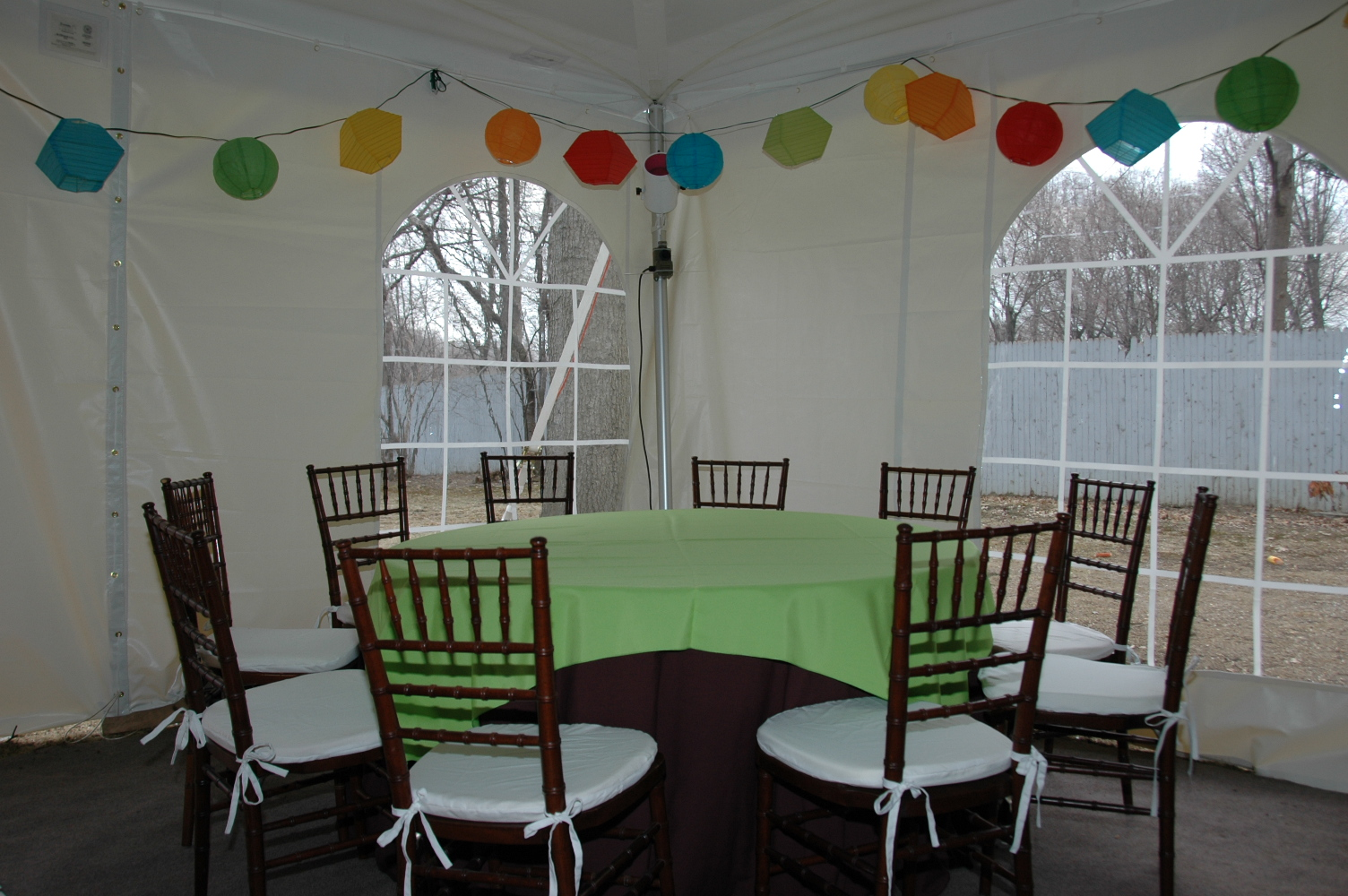
Chivari Fruitwood Ballroom Chairs

In 1807 Rivarola challenged Descalzi to design a new, modern chair based on a chair that he had brought from Paris. Descalzi created a simple, practical and elegant design for a cherrywood chair. The chairs are both light and robust. Descalzi exploited traditional knowledge, paid strict attention to quality and developed new manufacturing techniques. Chairs using the "Chiavarine" design became extremely popular and were purchased by many of the monarchs of the time. Descalzi's furniture designs won numerous medals at trade shows. His sons Emanuele and Giacomo and their descendants continued the chair making industry that he had founded. Many other factories opened in Chiavari and the surrounding towns, and some continue to make furniture today.
