= Chiavari chair =

Wooden chair of Ligurian design

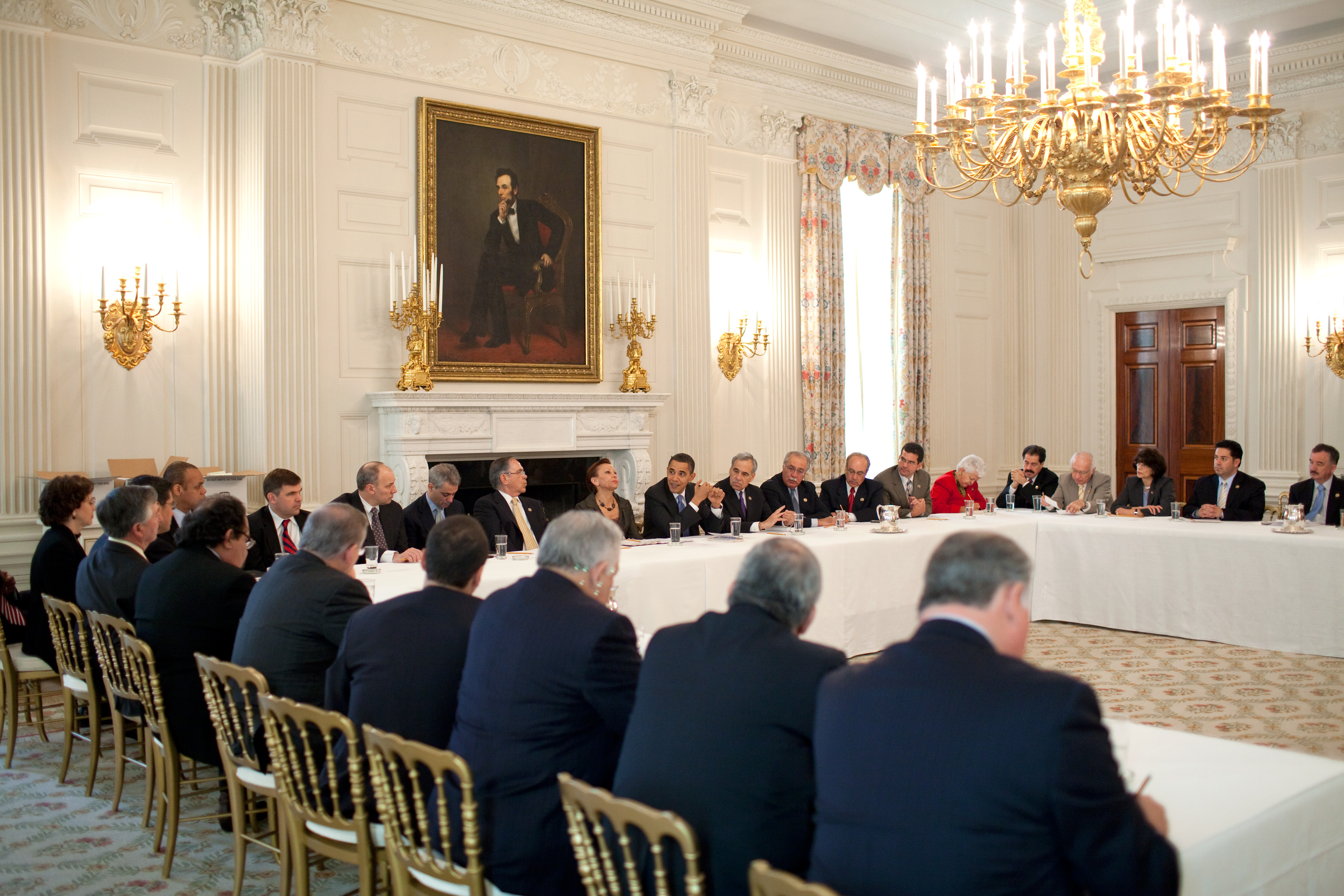
Chiavari chairs at a meeting in the White House State Dining Room in 2009

The Chiavari chair, also known as the Chiavarina, or Tiffany chair, is a wooden chair of Ligurian design.

== History ==
The Chiavarina was created in 1807 by a cabinetmaker from Chiavari on the northwestern Italian coast, Giuseppe Gaetano Descalzi. At the invitation of the President of the Economic Society of Chiavari, the Marquis Stefano Rivarola, Descalzi reworked some chairs in the French Empire style, simplifying the decorative elements and lightening the structural elements.

The chair was a success and soon many factories opened in Chiavari and surrounding towns. When Gaetano Descalzi died in 1855, about 600 workers were making Chiavari chairs. The chair was praised by Charles Albert of Savoy, Napoleon III, and by the sculptor Antonio Canova.

The success of the Chiavarina declined following the introduction of the Austrian chairs of Michael Thonet which were mass-produced, less expensive, and consisting of few elements easily assembled, and in the second half of the twentieth century, following competition from industrial production. The architect and designer Gio Ponti was inspired by the structural system of the Chiavari chair for his Superleggera chair of 1955.

== Features ==
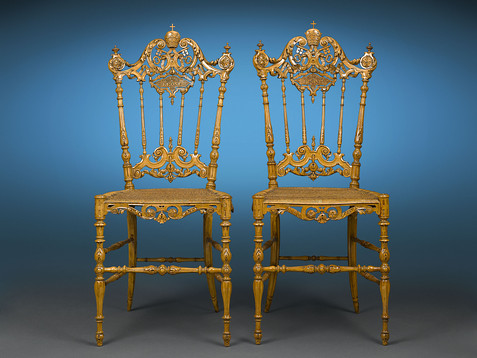
Chiavari Chairs given to Pope Leo XIII by the Italian City of Chiavari when the city became a diocese in 1892

The chair is designed with each component made for the specific stresses it will carry. Descalzi designed a slot system for the construction and a system to tie the strips of the purple willow which form the seat of the chair directly to the frame.

The timbers originally used by Descalzi were wild cherry and maple, which were added to beech and ash, all of them from inland forests in Italy.

== See also ==
- Chiavari
- Chair
- Sedia di Chiavari

== Bibliography ==
- A Montagni, L. Pessa, L'arte della Sedia a Chiavari (catalogue of an exhibition held at the Palazzo Rocca in Chiavari), Sagep, Genova, 1985.
- P. A. Lattarulo, Gaetano Descalzi, la sua "Chiavarina", i suoi continuatori, Tipografia Colombo, Chiavari 2005.
- F. Casoni, J. Casoni, Le sedie leggere di Chiavari, De Ferrari, Genova 2011.
