= Catherine Feuillet =

French geneticist

- Born: Catherine Feuillet; July 1965 (age 61); Orléans, France
- Education: Federal Institute for Agroecology in Zurich
- Occupation: Geneticist
- Known for: Sequencing chromosome 3B on the wheat genome
- Awards: Prix Foulon, Trophée de la Femme, Chevalier of the Legion of Honour, Jean Dufrenoy Prize from the Académie d'Agriculture of France

Catherine Feuillet (French pronunciation: [katʁin fœjɛ]; born July 1965) is a French geneticist. She investigated the molecular basis of fungal disease resistance in wheat and in barley and cloned the first leaf rust resistance gene from wheat. In 2004 she was hired as a research director at the Institut National de la Recherche Agronomique (INRA) in France to lead European and international projects on wheat genomics.

In 2008, she and her team successfully published the first mapping of the largest wheat chromosome, 3B, with the full sequence of this chromosome being published in 2014.

Feuillet was part of the IWSGC from 2005 to 2018. She has been employed as a geneticist by Bayer and Inari Agriculture. She is an elected fellow of the American Association for the Advancement of Science.

== Education and early life ==
Catherine Feuillet was born in Orléans and studied plant molecular biology in Toulouse. She received her doctorate in 1993 at the Paul Sabatier University regarding genes involved in lignification in Eucalyptus. Between 1994 and 1997, she completed post-doctoral studies at the Federal Institute for Agroecology in Zürich, developing molecular markers to support breeding for fungal disease resistance in wheat. She later became an assistant professor at the Institute of Plant Biology at the University of Zurich.

== Career ==
In 2004, she was employed by the Institut National de la Recherche Agronomique as a research director.

In 2005, she co-founded the International Wheat Genome Sequencing Consortium (IWGSC), an international effort to produce a high quality reference sequence of the bread wheat genome.

In 2005 she co-created and chaired the European Triticeae Genomics Initiative (ETGI), aimed at coordinating research in wheat, barley and rye in Europe.

Between 2008 and 2012 she led the "TriticeaeGenome: Genomics for Triticeae improvement".

In 2008, Feuillet's team published the first mapping results of the wheat chromosome 3B.

In 2008 she joined International Triticeae Mapping Initiative (ITMI) to assist with planning and coordination of research projects.

In 2009 she led Breedwheat, a French public-private partnership to strengthen the competitiveness of the French wheat breeding sector and address sustainability, quality and safety in agricultural production.

In 2011 she joined the Wheat Initiative, created by the G20 countries to improve global wheat production.

Feuillet has been employed by Bayer CropScience as the head of the Trait Research Department. Feuillet is employed as Chief Scientific Officer by private company Inari Agriculture.

== Wheat genome sequencing ==
Feuillet began work on sequencing the wheat genome in 2004 with the aim of decrypting the largest wheat chromosome, 3B. At that time, whole genome sequencing approaches did not yield any high quality sequence assemblies due to the extremely high amount of repetitive sequences in the wheat genome.

Feuillet and her team were the first to establish a physical map of chromosome 3B. Their work was published in Science in 2008. The reference sequence of chromosome 3B was published by Feuillet and her team concomitantly with the publications of a draft sequence of each individual chromosome by the IWGSC in 2014. The draft sequence of the 21 chromosomes enabled the annotation of 124,201 genes and comparative evolutionary analyses with diploid and tetraploid wheat relatives. These sequences anchored to many molecular markers on genetic maps, provided a springboard for faster gene isolation, rapid genetic marker development, and precise breeding through genome editing to accelerate wheat breeding.

== Awards ==
In 2009 Feuillet received the Prix Foulon from the French Academy of Sciences for her work on the wheat genome. She also received a gold Trophée de la Femme.

In 2010, she received the insignia of Chevalier of the Legion of Honour from the INRA.

In 2012 Feuillet received the Jean Dufrenoy Prize from the Académie d'Agriculture of France in 2012.

In 2015 Feuillet was awarded a Fellowship by the American Association for the Advancement of Science.
