= Fallet =

Fallet may refer to:

== People ==
- Nicolas Fallet (1746–1801), French playwright and journalist
- René Fallet (1927–1983), French screenwriter

== Other ==
- Fallet (TV series), Swedish television series
- Döda Fallet, extinct whitewater rapid
