= Nelson le Follet =

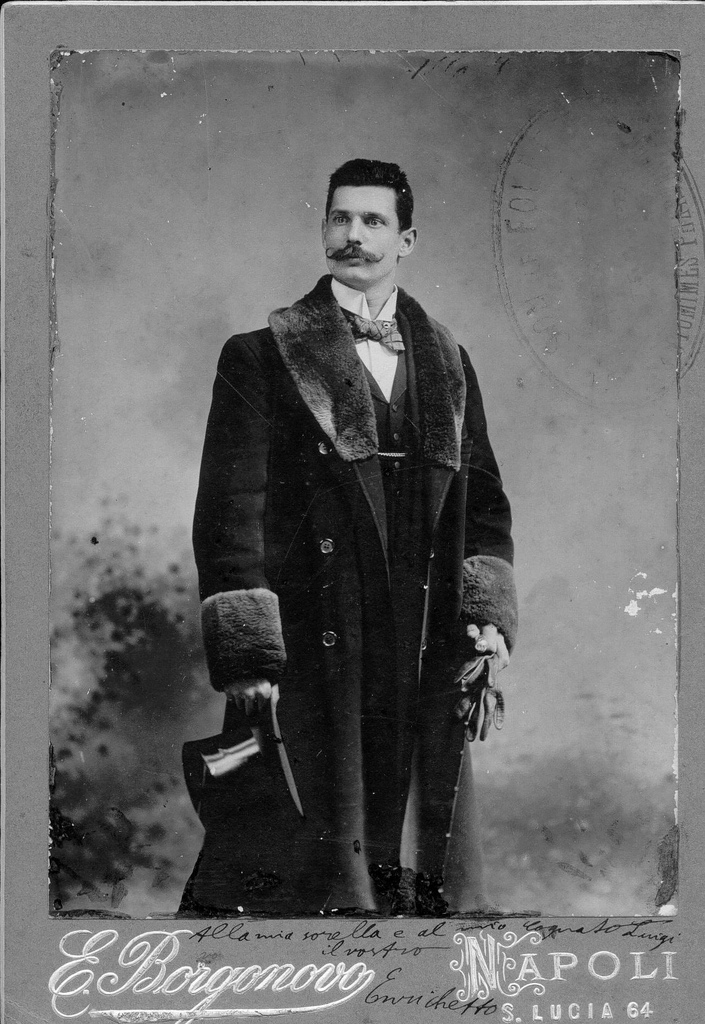
Nelson Follet in 1902

Nelson Le Follet, stage name of Bartolomeo Viganego, also known as Enrico or Enrichetto (14 May 1869 in San Fruttuoso – 20 September 1943 in Chiavari), was an Italian illusionist, impersonator and acrobat.

== Biography ==
During Le Follet's youth, he had been an athlete of the Christopher Columbus Gymnastics Society, thus dedicating himself to performing acrobatic acts in famous circuses of the time, such as the Parish Circus, under the name of the "Red Devil". His background as a Viganego gymnast, allowed him to perform mostly as an antipodean, as an expert of the circus art in juggling various objects with his feet, laying on his back and keeping his legs up in the air, more or less, vertically. He dedicated himself to pantomime, transforming and illusionist shows in Italian Theatres (such as the Venetian Malibran), French and Spanish Theatres, with his own company, "Troupe Nelson". In 1898-99, in his shows, he used a projecting machine, made by the brothers Auguste and Louis Lumière. At the beginning of the century, mostly, he used names of art such as Nelson Viganego, Nelson Le Follet or Nelson Follet, and, sometimes the Italian version of "Nelson Folletto". After his circus experience, another ideal place for Le Follet's exhibitions was the coffee-concert Paris style kind of show. In April 1902, he staged at the Umberto the first Napolitano Theatre, a show called Arizof, which had been described by those times' newspapers as, " a fantastic and spectacular choreographic act by Nelson Follet (prose, music and dance)". The prima ballerina was Elvira Valentini.

After this, he had shows in France (at the Olympia in Paris), Spain, Belgium, Poland, Estonia and Brazil, being active until the eve of the First World War. In the very first years after the war, he worked as a theatre agent, based in Genoa. Only few photos of Le Follet are left. The only existent photo, from the early 1900s, shows him, dressed with a coat in sea otter fur and beaver fur reverts.

== Bibliography ==
- Carlo Alfredo Clerici, Stefania Acerra. Le magiche avventure di Nelson Le Follet. Vita e spettacoli di Enrico Viganego, artista della Belle Époque. Dispensa della conferenza tenuta a Milano, 8 settembre 2015. Con testimonianze di Elvira Costa, discendente di Bartolomeo Viganego.
