= Clyde Follet Seavey =

American painter (1904–1991)

- Born: June 23, 1904; Sacramento, California
- Died: 1991 (aged 86–87)
- Known for: Painting, Drawing, Illustration

Clyde Follet Seavey (June 23, 1904 – 1991) was an American artist.

Seavey was born in Sacramento, California. His father was a city official in Sacramento. Seavey married a Peruvian woman named Adele de Izcue. Together, they had a son named Clyde Izcue Seavey Jr.

Adele de Izcue died in 2001. Both Seavey's wife and only child were often subjects in his drawings and paintings.

Seavey attended UC Berkeley. Here, he won a scholarship to attend the California College of Arts & Crafts. After graduation, he opened a San Francisco-based commercial art company with Louis Shawl and Paul Nyland. The company was in business for more than a half-century. Separate from his company, Seavey worked as a commercial artist for multiple magazines including The American Weekly. Seavey's personal work, sketchbooks and paintings, portray his early domestic life in Laguna, California.

Seavey has shown work in museums and galleries around California, including a show at Gilbert Galleries in 1966. He is noted for his paintings of old, San Franciscan mansions and Victorian houses at night or in twilight. The Seavey family owned a four-story home in Pacific Heights. The artist used this space as a gallery for his expansive body of portraits and San Francisco scenes. The house was torn down around 1980.

Seavey was a member of the San Francisco Artists Club, the San Francisco Artists & Art Directors Club, and the San Francisco Advertising Club. Seavey died in 1991.
