= Chiavari =

Town near Genoa in Liguria, Italy

Chiavari Ciävai (Ligurian)
- Comune
- Comune di Chiavari
- View of Chiavari

- Coat of arms

- Location within Italy Location within Liguria
- Coordinates: 44°19′N 9°20′E
- Country: Italy
- Region: Liguria
- Metropolitan city: Genoa (GE)
- Frazioni: Campodonico, Sanguineto, Sant'Andrea di Rovereto, Caperana, Maxena, Ri, San Pier di Canne

Government
  - Mayor: Federico Messuti

Area
  - Total: 12.23 km^{2} (4.72 sq mi)
- Elevation: 5 m (16 ft)

Population (2026)
  - Total: 27,435
  - Density: 2,243/km^{2} (5,810/sq mi)
- Demonym: Chiavaresi
- Time zone: UTC+1 (CET)
  - Summer (DST): UTC+2 (CEST)
- Postal code: 16043
- Dialing code: 0185
- Website: Official website

Chiavari (Italian pronunciation: [ˈkjaːvari]; Ligurian: Ciävai [ˈtʃaːvaj]) is a seaside town and comune (municipality) in the Metropolitan City of Genoa in the region of Liguria in Italy. As of 2026, with a population of 27,435, it is the 3rd-largest municipality in the metropolitan city and the 7th-largest in Liguria.

It has a beachside promenade and a marina and is situated near the river Entella.

== History ==
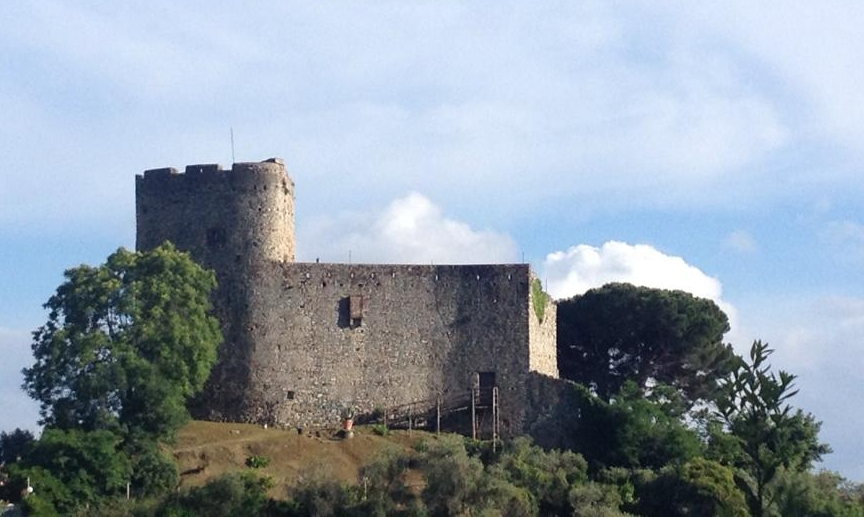
Chiavari Castle

=== Pre-Roman and Roman Era ===
A pre-Roman necropolis, which dates from the 8th to 7th century BC, has been uncovered in the area where Chiavari is located now. Chiavari grew up on the traces of a Roman camp on the Via Aurelia.

=== Medieval Era ===
A castle was constructed in 1147. The old town contains numerous arcades and buildings from the 13th century, including a castle, several mansions, and the nearby Church of San Salvatore di Lavagna, which was founded in 1224 by Innocent IV.

The cathedral was rebuilt in 1613. Famous as a center of humanism, Chiavari has a public library with a collection of manuscripts and incunabula. After the discovery of the conspiracy of the Fieschi, in 1542, and the capture of Chiavari by the Counts of Lavagna, the town suffered greatly, being associated with the conspirators. Among its illustrious citizens were Luca Cantiano di Moneglia, founder of an art academy, and Giuseppe Gregorio Solari, translator of many Latin poets.

=== 19th century ===
From 1805 to 1814, Chiavari served as the capital of the short-lived Apennins Departments of France of the First French Empire. Chiavari is the home of the Chiavari chair designed in 1807 by a local, Giuseppe Gaetano Descalzi. The chair was a success and led to the opening of many factories in Chiavari and surrounding towns.

Chiavari railway station was opened in 1868; it provides an underground passageway between the town centre and the beachside promenades.

=== 20th century ===
The Colonia Fara building was built in 1935 during the Fascist regime.

== Climate ==
Climate data for Chiavari (1971–2000)
Month	Jan	Feb	Mar	Apr	May	Jun	Jul	Aug	Sep	Oct	Nov	Dec	Year
Mean daily maximum °C (°F)	11.7 (53.1)	12.3 (54.1)	14.4 (57.9)	16.8 (62.2)	20.9 (69.6)	24.4 (75.9)	27.7 (81.9)	27.6 (81.7)	23.9 (75.0)	19.5 (67.1)	14.9 (58.8)	12.3 (54.1)	18.9 (66.0)
Daily mean °C (°F)	9.1 (48.4)	9.6 (49.3)	11.4 (52.5)	13.6 (56.5)	17.4 (63.3)	20.8 (69.4)	23.9 (75.0)	24.0 (75.2)	20.6 (69.1)	16.6 (61.9)	12.3 (54.1)	9.9 (49.8)	15.8 (60.4)
Mean daily minimum °C (°F)	6.6 (43.9)	6.7 (44.1)	8.3 (46.9)	10.3 (50.5)	13.9 (57.0)	17.1 (62.8)	20.2 (68.4)	20.3 (68.5)	17.3 (63.1)	13.8 (56.8)	9.7 (49.5)	7.5 (45.5)	12.6 (54.8)
Average precipitation mm (inches)	105 (4.1)	89 (3.5)	94 (3.7)	65 (2.6)	65 (2.6)	48 (1.9)	22 (0.9)	62 (2.4)	86 (3.4)	136 (5.4)	129 (5.1)	93 (3.7)	994 (39.3)
Average precipitation days (≥ 1.0 mm)	9	7	9	7	7	5	3	4	6	8	9	7	81
Source 1: Istituto Superiore per la Protezione e la Ricerca Ambientale
Source 2: Enea-Casaccia (precipitation 1961–1990)

== Demographics ==
As of 2026, the population is 27,435, of which 46.5% are males, and 53.5% are females. Minors make up 13.3% of the population, and seniors make up 30.6%.

Historical population

Year	Pop.	±%
1861	10,818	—
1871	12,008	+11.0%
1881	12,666	+5.5%
1901	12,689	+0.2%
1911	13,700	+8.0%
1921	14,504	+5.9%
1931	16,515	+13.9%
1936	17,520	+6.1%

Year	Pop.	±%
1951	20,279	+15.7%
1961	24,603	+21.3%
1971	30,884	+25.5%
1981	30,082	−2.6%
1991	28,584	−5.0%
2001	27,476	−3.9%
2011	27,338	−0.5%
2021	27,228	−0.4%

Source: ISTAT

=== Foreign population ===
Foreign population by country of birth (2025)
Country of birth	Population
Albania	791
Ecuador	359
Peru	339
Ukraine	286
Morocco	201
Moldova	180
Romania	160
Argentina	144
China	128
Chile	126
Brazil	89
France	67
Russia	59
United Kingdom	59
Bangladesh	57

As of 2025, immigrants make up 14.2% of the population. The 5 largest foreign countries of birth are Albania, Ecuador, Peru, Ukraine, and Morocco.

== Sports ==
In 2014, the local football team Virtus Entella were promoted to the Italian Serie B for the first time in their history. In 2018 they were relegated back to the third tier but they came back again the following year. After another relegation in 2021, they returned to the second division in 2025.

== Notable people ==
- Esteban Campodónico (1866–1938), medical doctor, university professor, and philanthropist
- Nelson le Follet (1869–1943), illusionist, impersonator, and acrobat
