= Norton Simon Museum =

Art museum in Pasadena, California

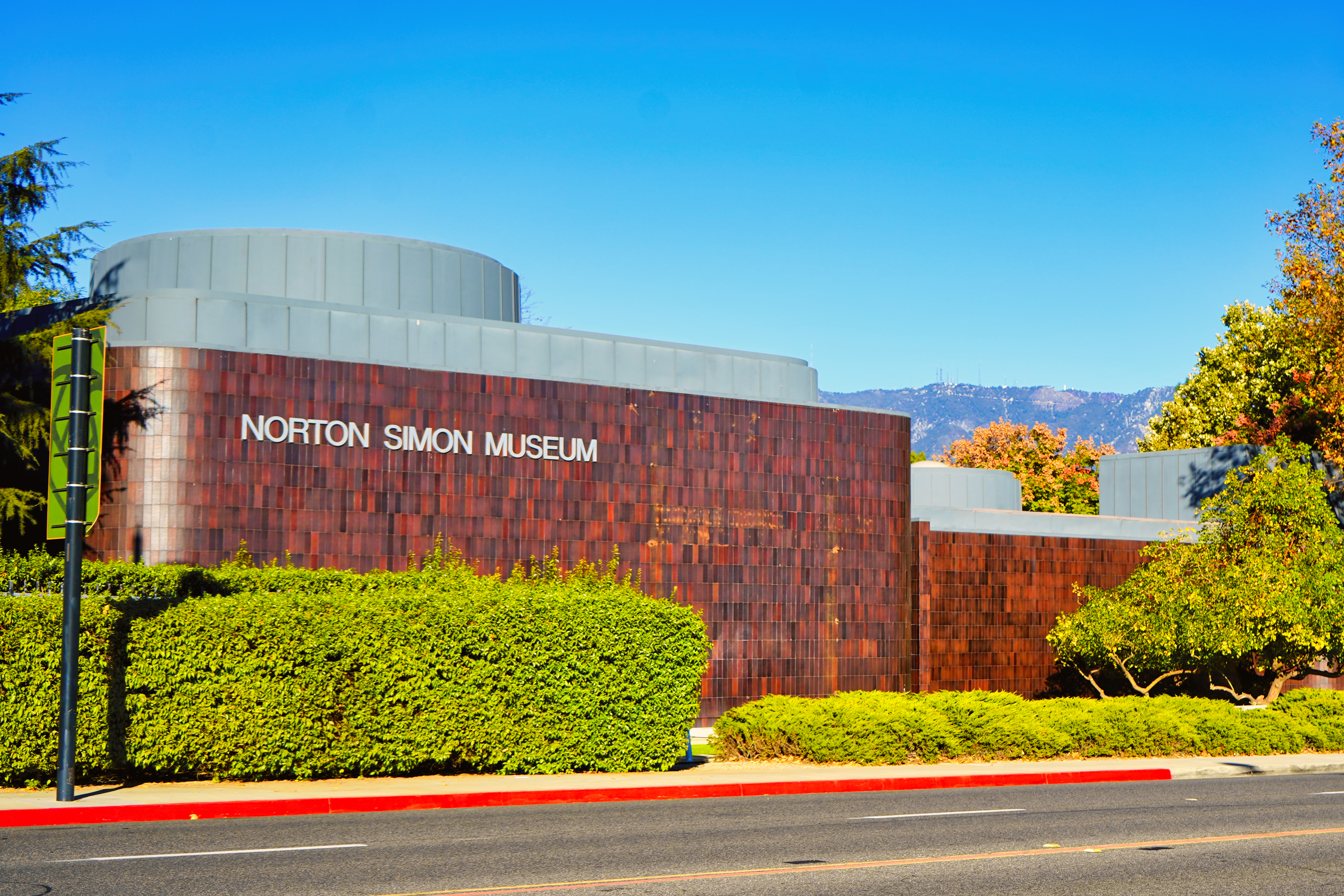
- The museum in 2020
- Former name: Pasadena Art Institute, Pasadena Art Museum
- Established: March 1, 1975
- Location: Pasadena, California
- Coordinates: 34.146203°N 118.159097°W
- Type: Art museum
- Collection size: approximately 12,500 objects / approximately 800 objects on display
- President: Walter W. Timoshuk
- Curator: Emily Talbot
- Architect: Ladd + Kelsey
- Public transit access: Metro Local Bus 180 / Pasadena Transit Route 10, 33
- Website: nortonsimon.org

The Norton Simon Museum is an art museum located in Pasadena, California, United States. It was previously known as the Pasadena Art Institute and the Pasadena Art Museum and displays numerous sculptures on its grounds.

The Norton Simon collections include European paintings, sculptures, and tapestries; Asian sculptures, paintings, and woodblock prints. Outside sculptures surround the museum, with notable Rodin sculptures near its entrance and other sculptures along Colorado Boulevard and in a landscape setting around a large pond. The museum contains the Norton Simon Theater which shows film programs daily, and hosts lectures, symposia, and dance and musical performances year-round. The museum is located on Colorado Boulevard along the route of the Tournament of Roses's Rose Parade, where its distinctive, brown tile exterior can be seen in the background of television broadcasts.

== History ==
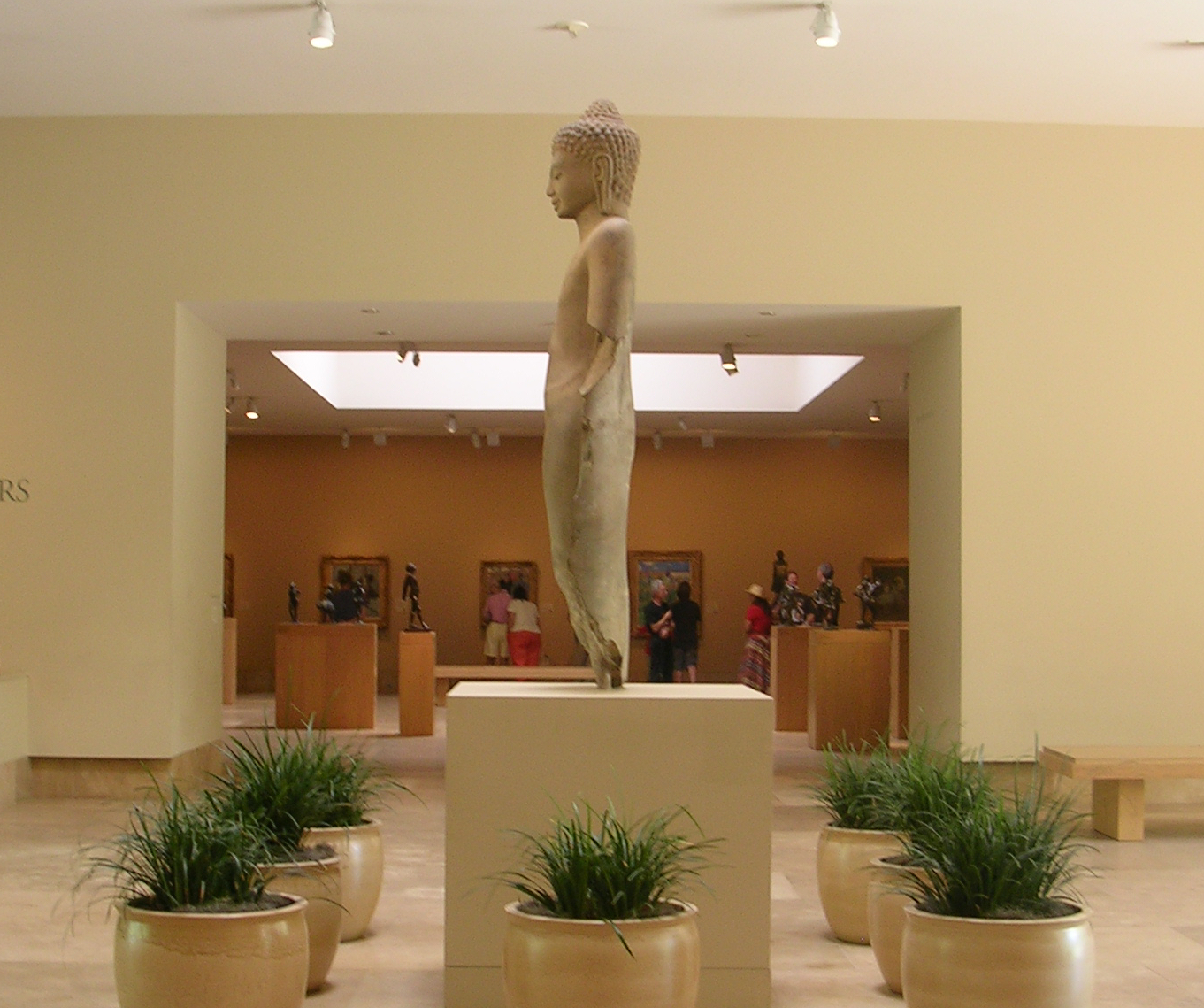
The museum entrance hall

After receiving approximately 400 German Expressionist pieces from collector Galka Scheyer in 1953, the Pasadena Art Institute changed its name to the Pasadena Art Museum in 1954 and occupied the Chinoiserie-style "The Grace Nicholson Treasure House of Oriental Art" building (now the Pacific Asia Museum) on North Los Robles Avenue until 1970. The museum filled a void, being the only modern art museum between San Francisco and La Jolla in California at the time. It was known for progressive art exhibits and supported the work of local contemporary artists such as Helen Lundeberg, John McLaughlin, and Sam Francis. In 1962, curator Walter Hopps arrived from the Ferus gallery, organizing an early Pop art show in 1962 and a Marcel Duchamp retrospective in 1963, as well as solo shows of the work of Kurt Schwitters and Joseph Cornell.

Hopps later drew up a short list of California architects for a new museum building, including Richard Neutra, Charles Eames, John Lautner, Craig Ellwood, and Thornton Ladd. Hopps insisted on a local architect because he expected a high level of interaction throughout the design process. A new Pasadena Art Museum building was completed in 1969, designed by Pasadena architects Thornton Ladd and John Kelsey of the firm Ladd & Kelsey. The general contractor selected to build the museum was Del E. Webb Corporation. The distinctive and modern curvilinear exterior facade is faced in 115,000 glazed tiles, in varying rich brown tones with an undulating surface, made by ceramic artisan Edith Heath. Hopps resigned before the museum opened.

In the early 1970s, due to an ambitious schedule of exhibits and the new building project, the museum began to experience serious financial hardships. By that time, industrialist Norton Simon, who had risen to become one of the pre-eminent art collectors in the world during the 1960s, was searching for a permanent location for his growing collection of over 4,000 objects. He was first approached for financial assistance in 1971 by trustees of the museum. In 1974, the museum and Simon came to an agreement. According to the agreed five-year plan, Simon took over an $850,000 loan on the building and other financial obligations, including a $1 million accumulated operating deficit, in return for using 75% of the gallery space for his collection. The remainder was used to display the Pasadena museum's contemporary collection. A new 10-member board of trustees was formed, consisting of four members from Simon's group, three from the Pasadena museum board and three public members nominated by Simon. Simon also became responsible for the collection and building projects; in return the museum was renamed the Norton Simon Museum and renovated at a reported cost of more than $3 million. The detailed history of that process was told by former director and art critic John Coplans (who later became an artist) in Artforum. This move, widely criticized by the local community as it represented the closing of the only contemporary art museum between San Francisco and La Jolla, led indirectly to the founding of the Museum of Contemporary Art, Los Angeles in 1979, a project largely driven by Norton Simon's sister Marcia Weisman.

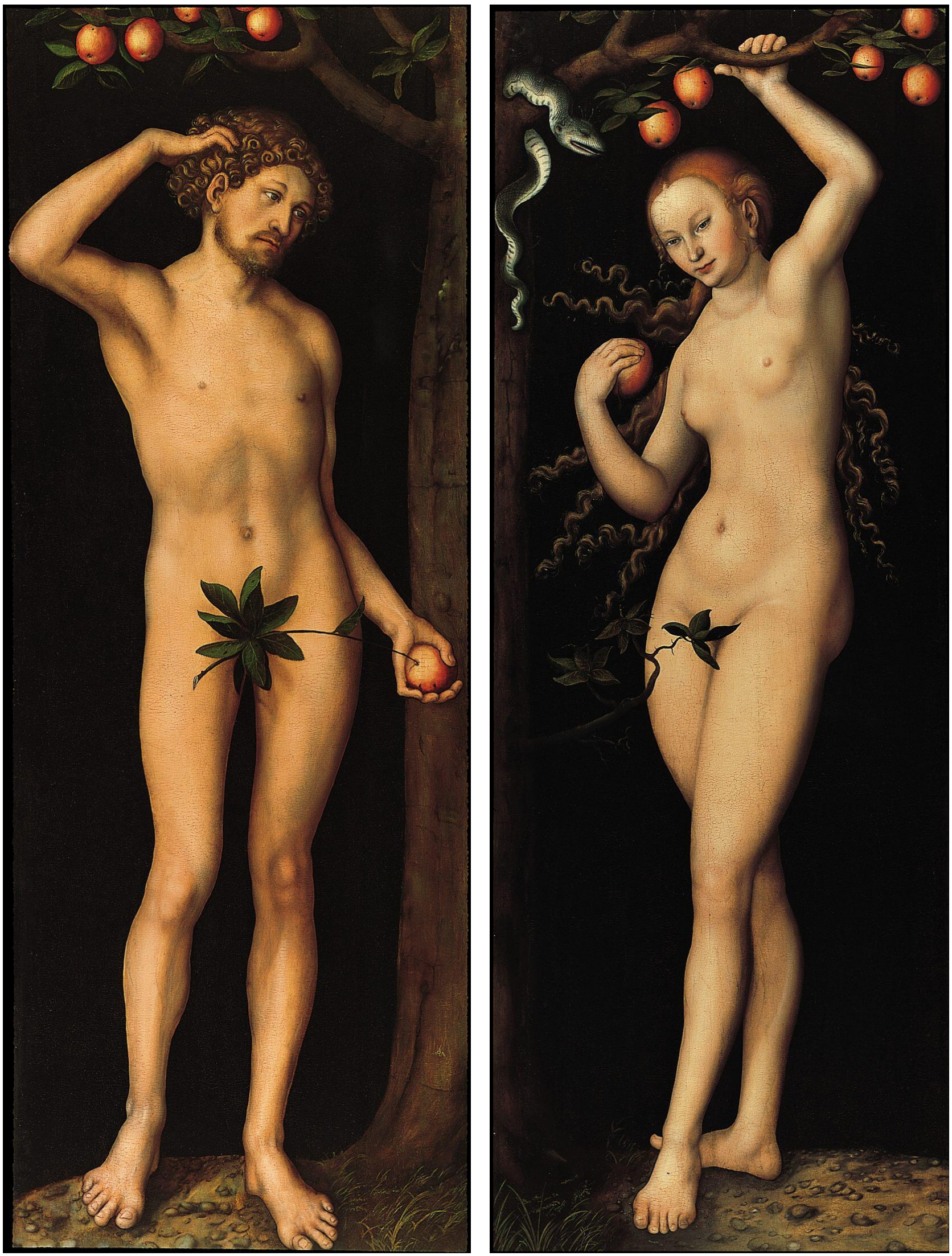
Lucas Cranach the Elder, Adam and Eve (pair), c. 1530

Simon died in 1993, and the actress Jennifer Jones, his widow and chairwoman of the board, made corrective, conciliatory moves that have repositioned the museum and its two collections. In 1995, the museum began a major $5 million renovation with the architect Frank Gehry, a longtime trustee of the museum. The redesign resulted in a procession of medium-size, more intimate galleries with raised ceilings and improved lighting, increased rotating exhibition space, an entire floor devoted to Asian art, and restored access to the gardens. The gardens, which are located on the old "Carmelita" property, were redesigned by Power and Associates to house the 20th-century sculpture collection in an engaging setting. The new Norton Simon Theater was the final element of the renovation, designed by Gensler & Associates, and is used for lectures, film, dance performances and concerts.

== Collections ==
The Norton Simon Museum, which comprises more than 11,000 objects, contains a significant permanent collection which is highly regarded internationally. The museum itself does not own the works it displays; instead, most of the art is on long-term loan from The Norton Simon Foundation and the Norton Simon Art Foundation, which each own different groups of artworks. As of 2014, their public filings placed the combined fair-market value of the artworks at about $5 billion. The museum makes relatively little effort to expand the collection amassed by its founder, but it still receives gifts. However, no more than 800 or 900 of those pieces are on display at any one time. The museum also mounts temporary exhibitions that focus on a particular artist, an art movement or artistic period, or art that was created in a specific region or country.

For more than three decades after it was founded in 1975, the Norton Simon Museum maintained a no-loans policy. In 2007, the board agreed to circulate select works to museums including the National Gallery of Art in Washington D.C., saying it wanted the museum to become better known. In 2009, it entered into a reciprocal loan agreement with the Frick Collection in New York City.

=== Asian art ===
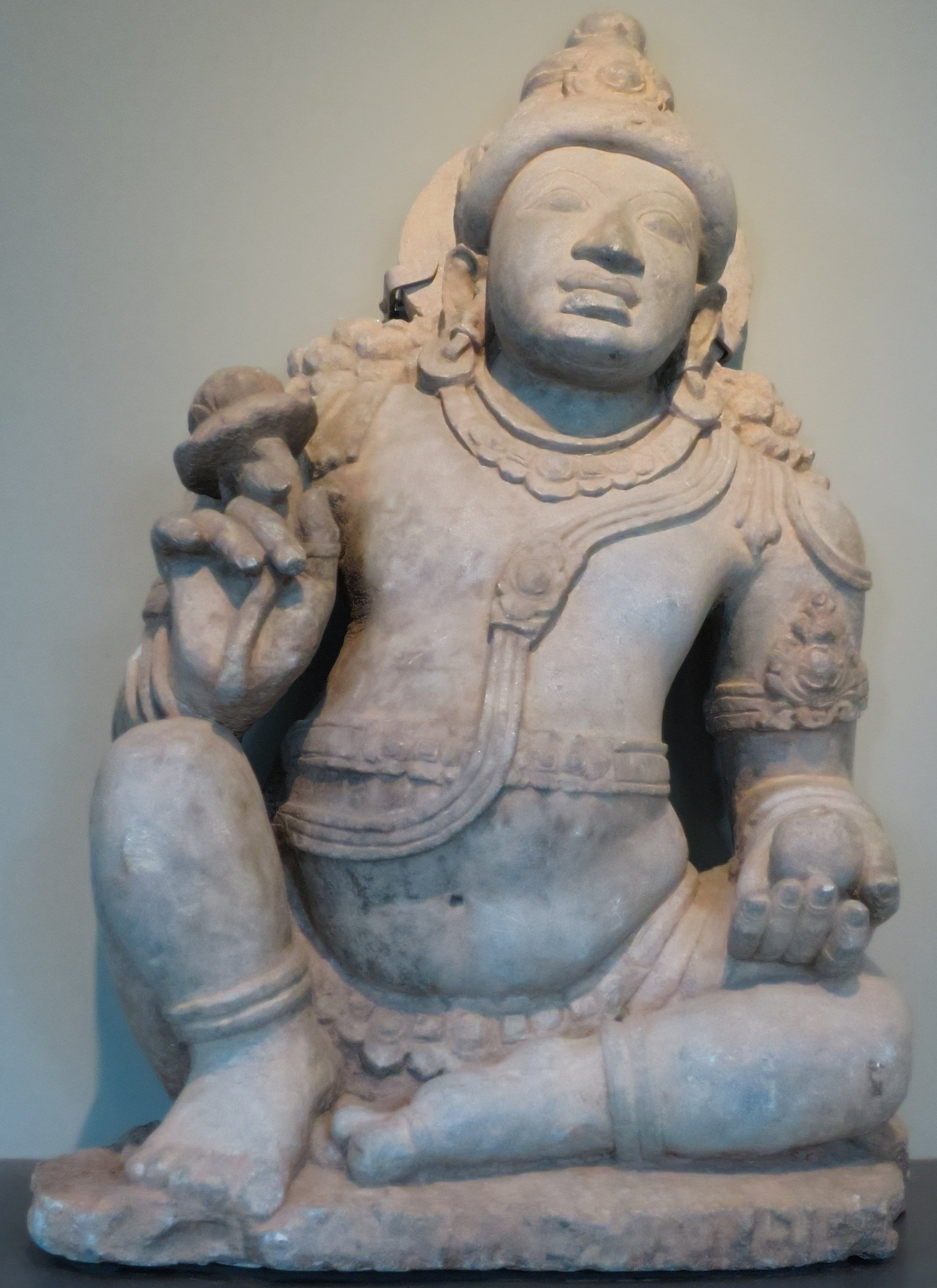
'Digambara Yaksha Sarvahna' from Karnataka, India, c. 900 CE

The museum has a collection of art from South Asia and Southeast Asia, with examples of this region's sculptural and painting traditions. On display are holdings from India, Pakistan, Nepal, Tibet, Cambodia and Thailand, as well as selected works from Afghanistan, Myanmar, Bangladesh, China, Indonesia, Sri Lanka, Vietnam, and Japan. The collection is particularly rich in art from the Indian subcontinent, including monumental stone sculpture from the Kushana and Gupta periods, and a remarkable group of Chola bronzes from southern India. Selections of the museum's Rajput paintings from India, and thangkas, or Buddhist religious paintings, from Tibet and Nepal are well represented. The significant collection of Japanese woodblock prints includes objects that were formerly in the collection of Frank Lloyd Wright.

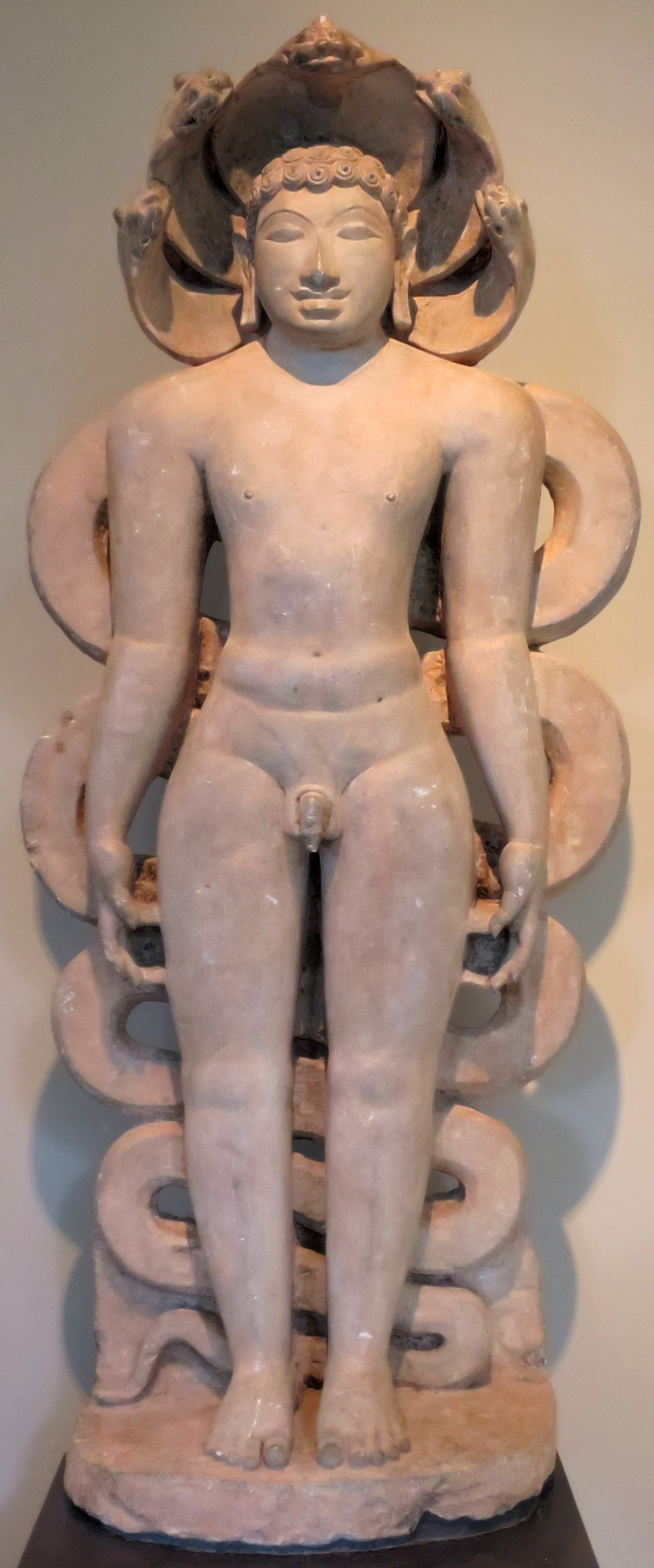
'Jina Suparsvanatha' from Karnataka, India, c. 900

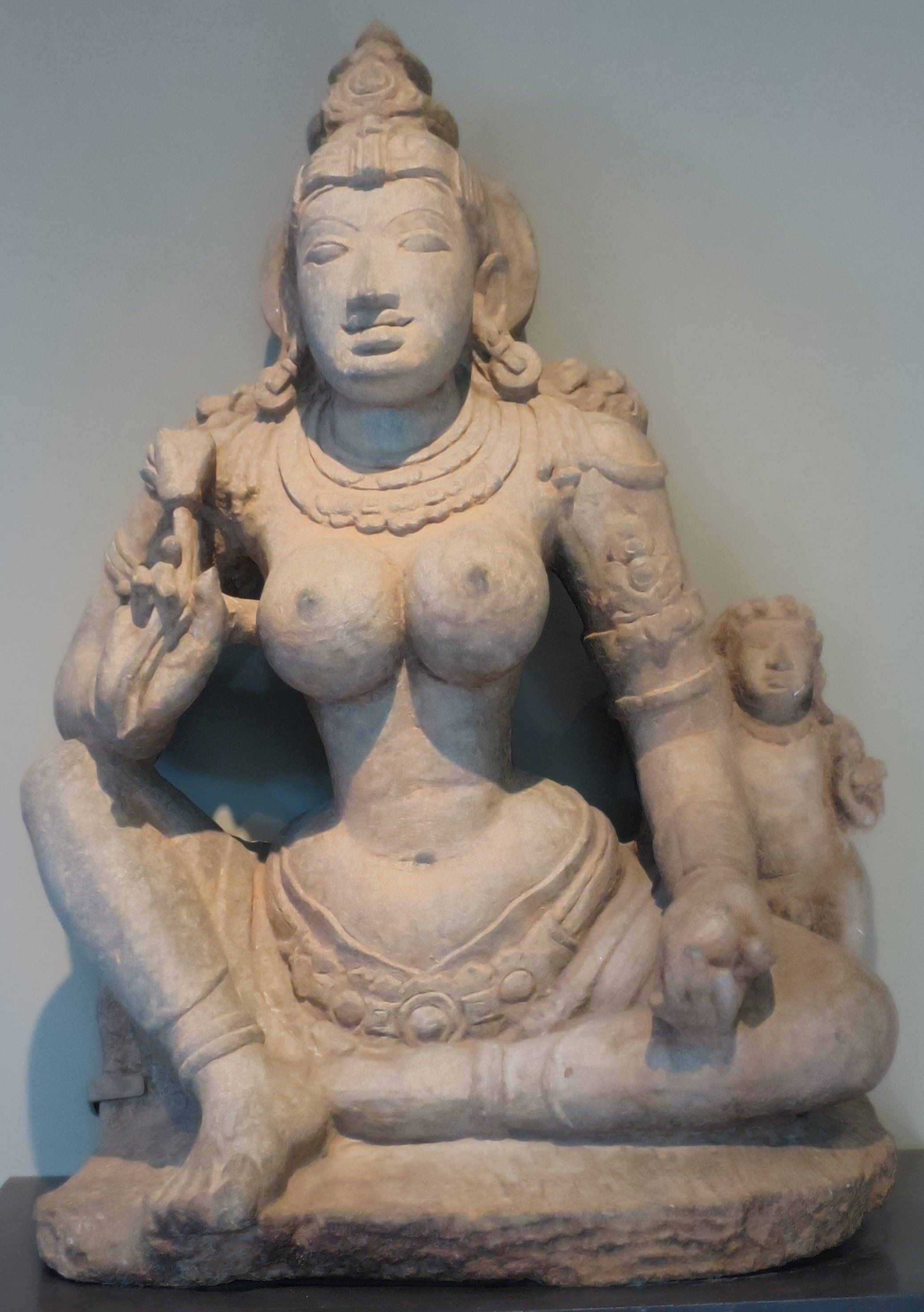
'Digambara Yakshi Kushmandini' from Karnataka, India, c. 900

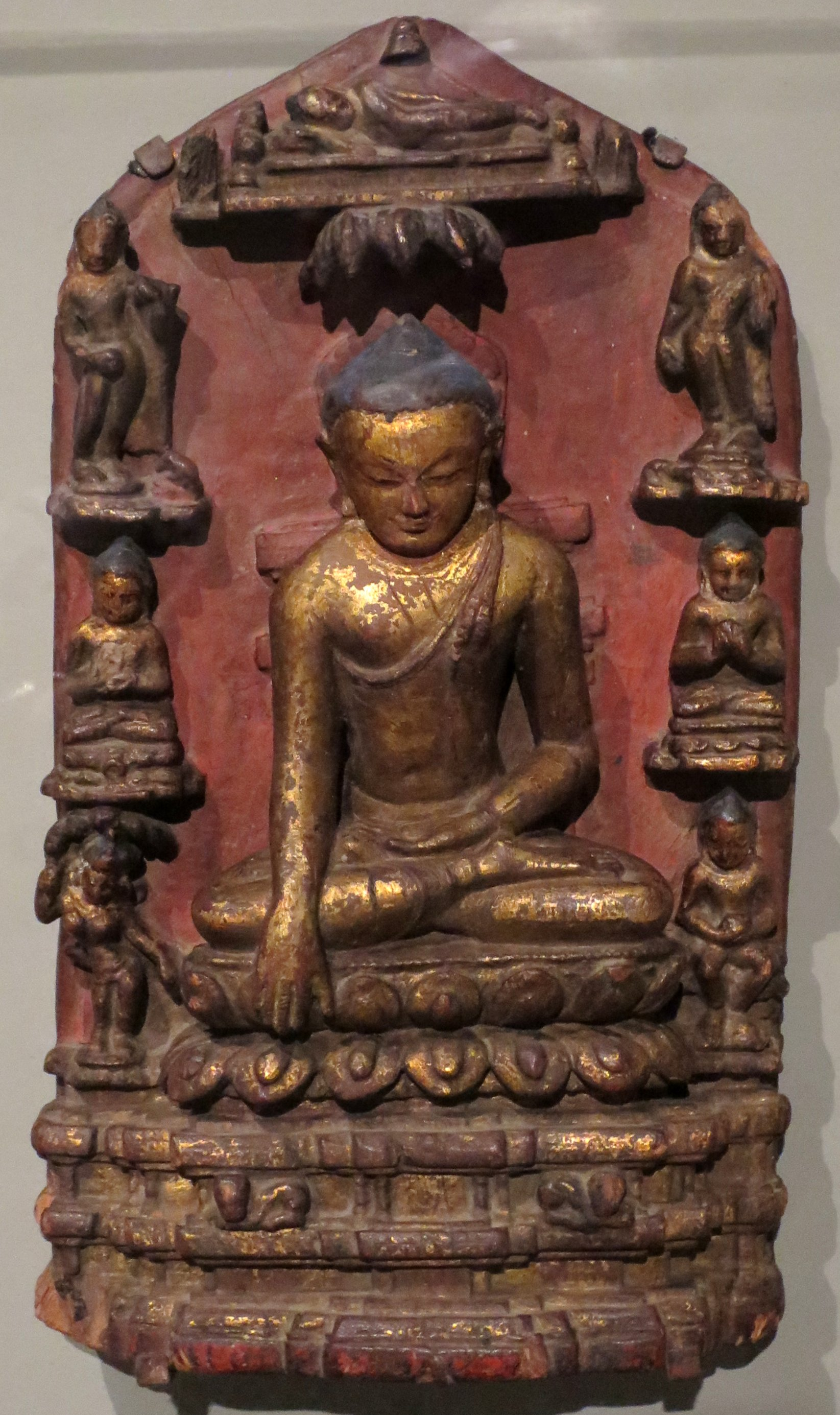
8 Miraculous Events of the Buddha's Life from Myanmar, 13th century

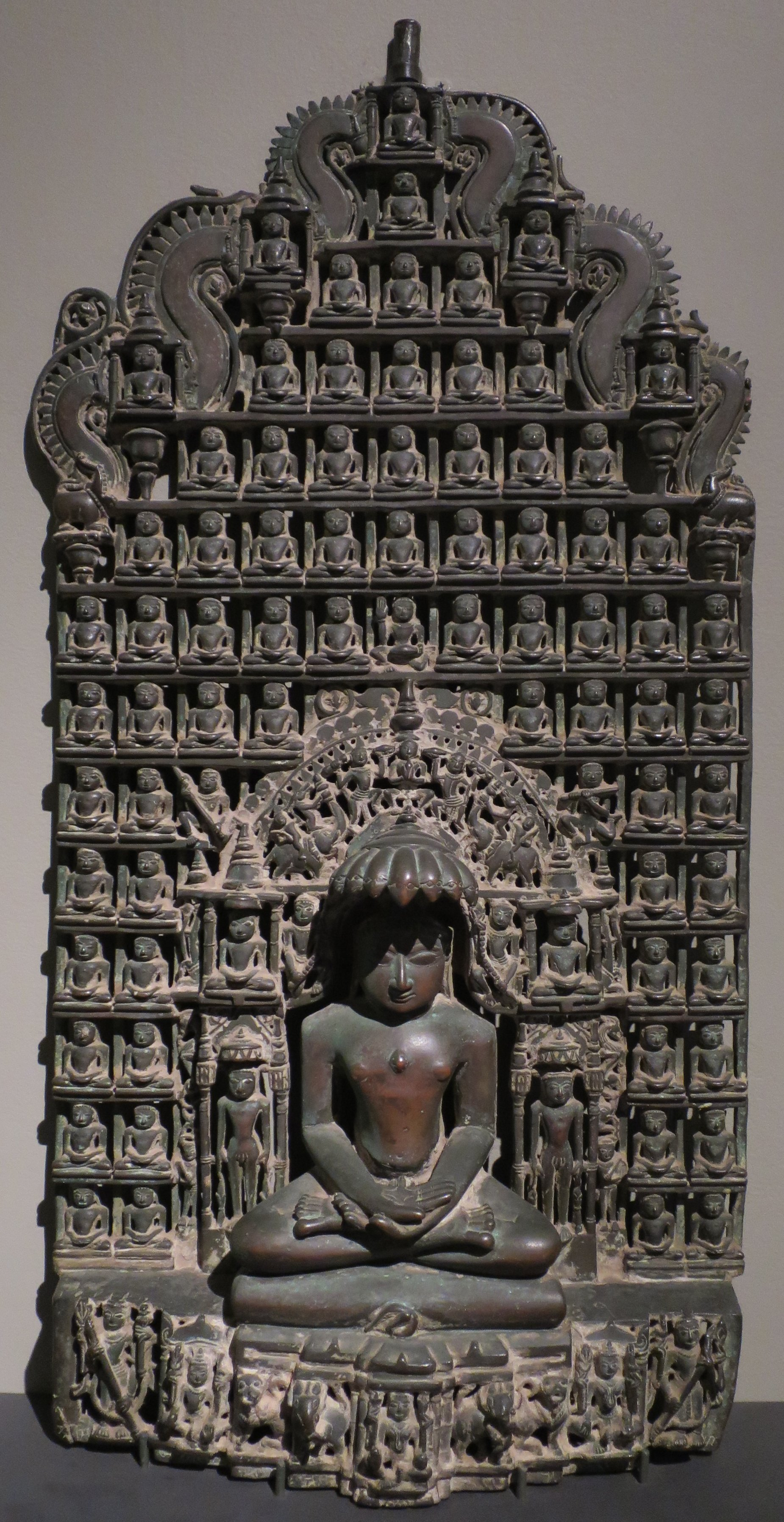
Jain chaubisi

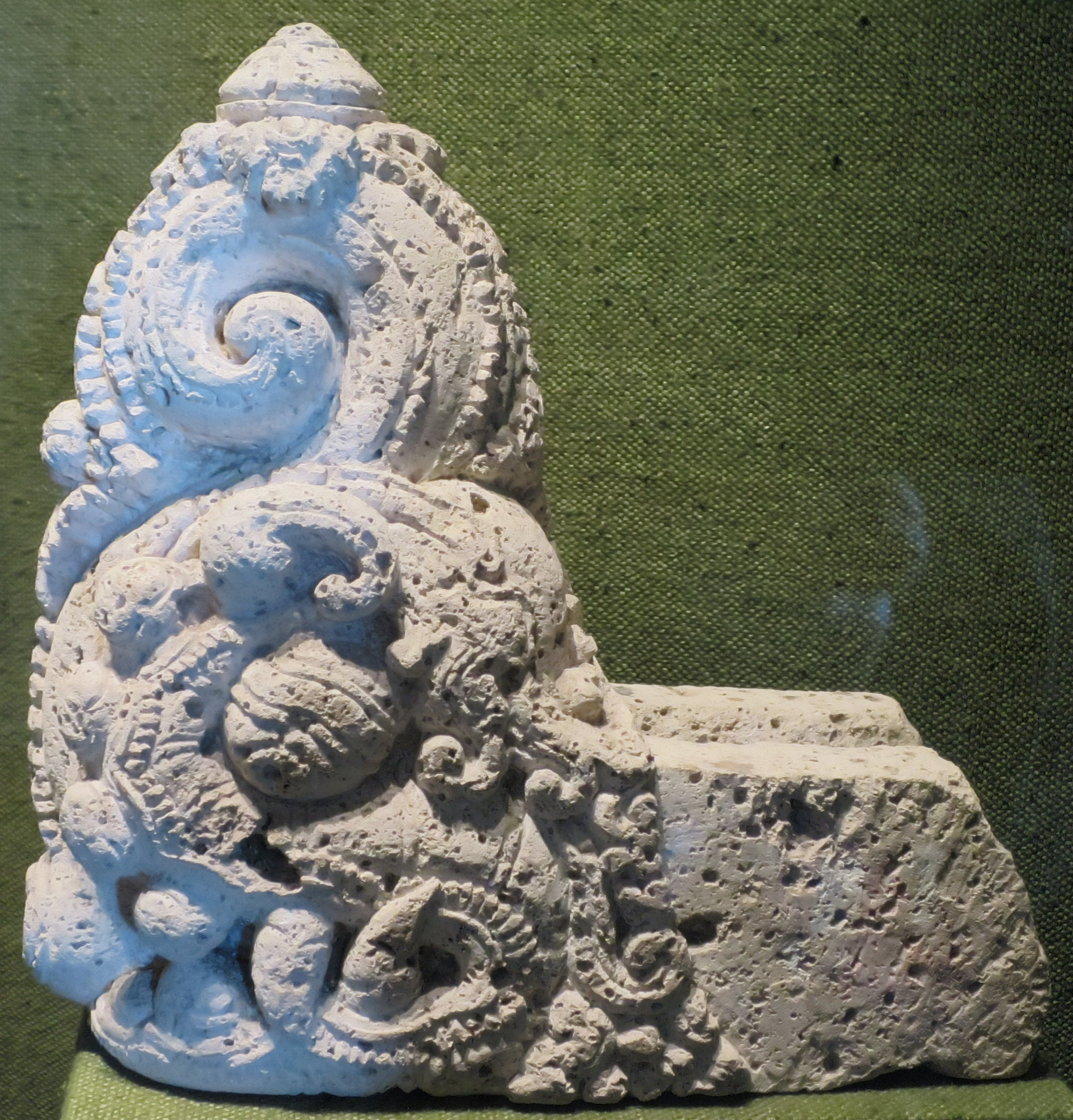
Water spout, central Java, 15th century

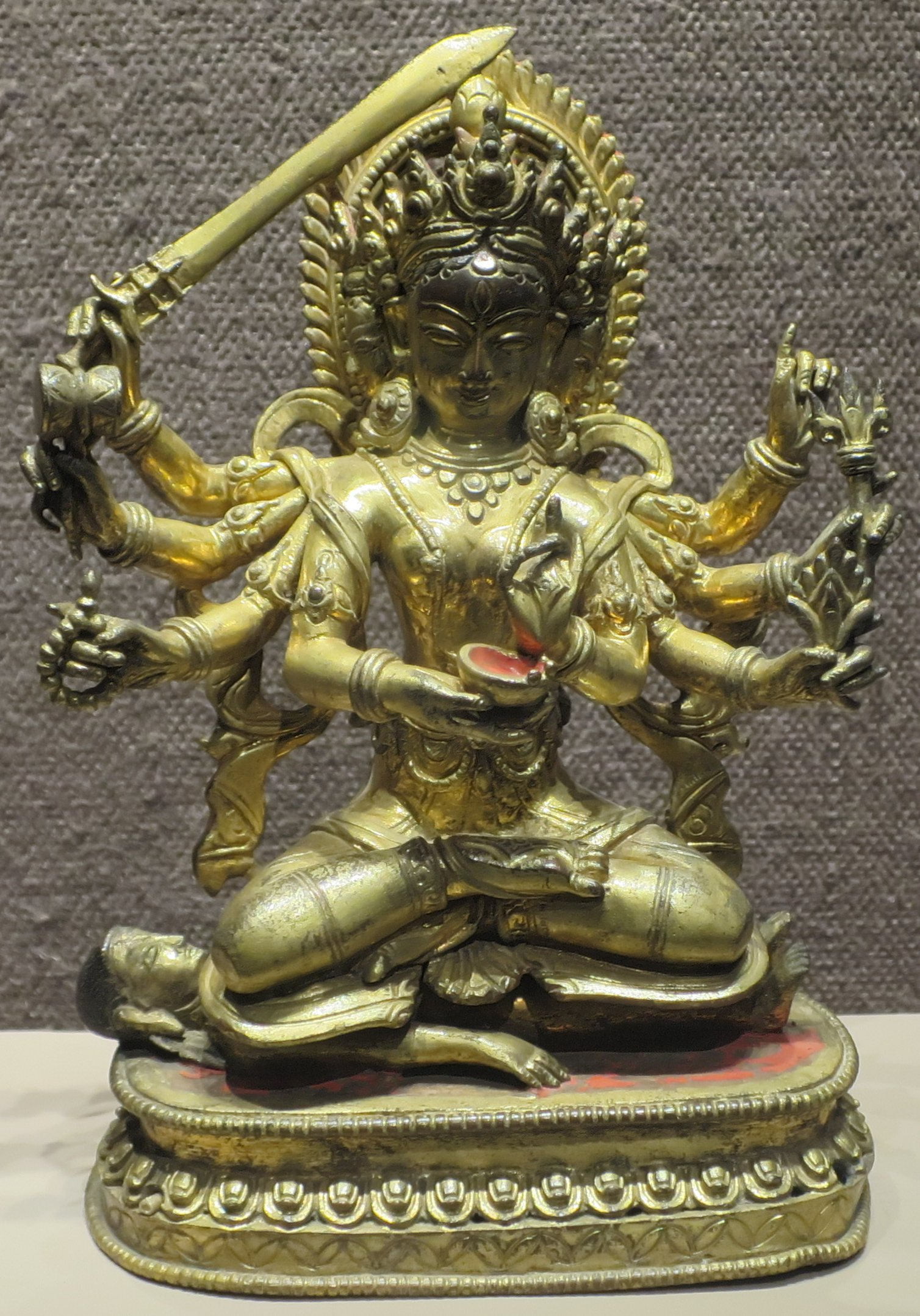
'Hindu Goddess' from Nepal, c. 1700, gilt bronze

=== European art: 14th–16th centuries ===
Masterworks of the Early Renaissance, the High Renaissance and Mannerism make up the museum's extensive collection of 14th- to 16th-century European art. Exquisite works by Paolo Veneziano and Giovanni di Paolo, and an exceptional Guariento di Arpo altarpiece, anchor the museum's collection of gold-ground panel paintings. Jacopo Bassano, Botticelli, Filippino Lippi and Raphael are represented by rich oil paintings of religious scenes. Also represented are magnificent examples of such Northern European masters as Lucas Cranach the Elder, Dieric Bouts and Hans Memling. The portraits of Giorgione, Giovanni Bellini and El Greco reflect the great diversity of subject matter in the collection. Ownership of Cranach's Adam and Eve is disputed due to their history as Nazi loot.

=== European art: 17th–18th centuries ===
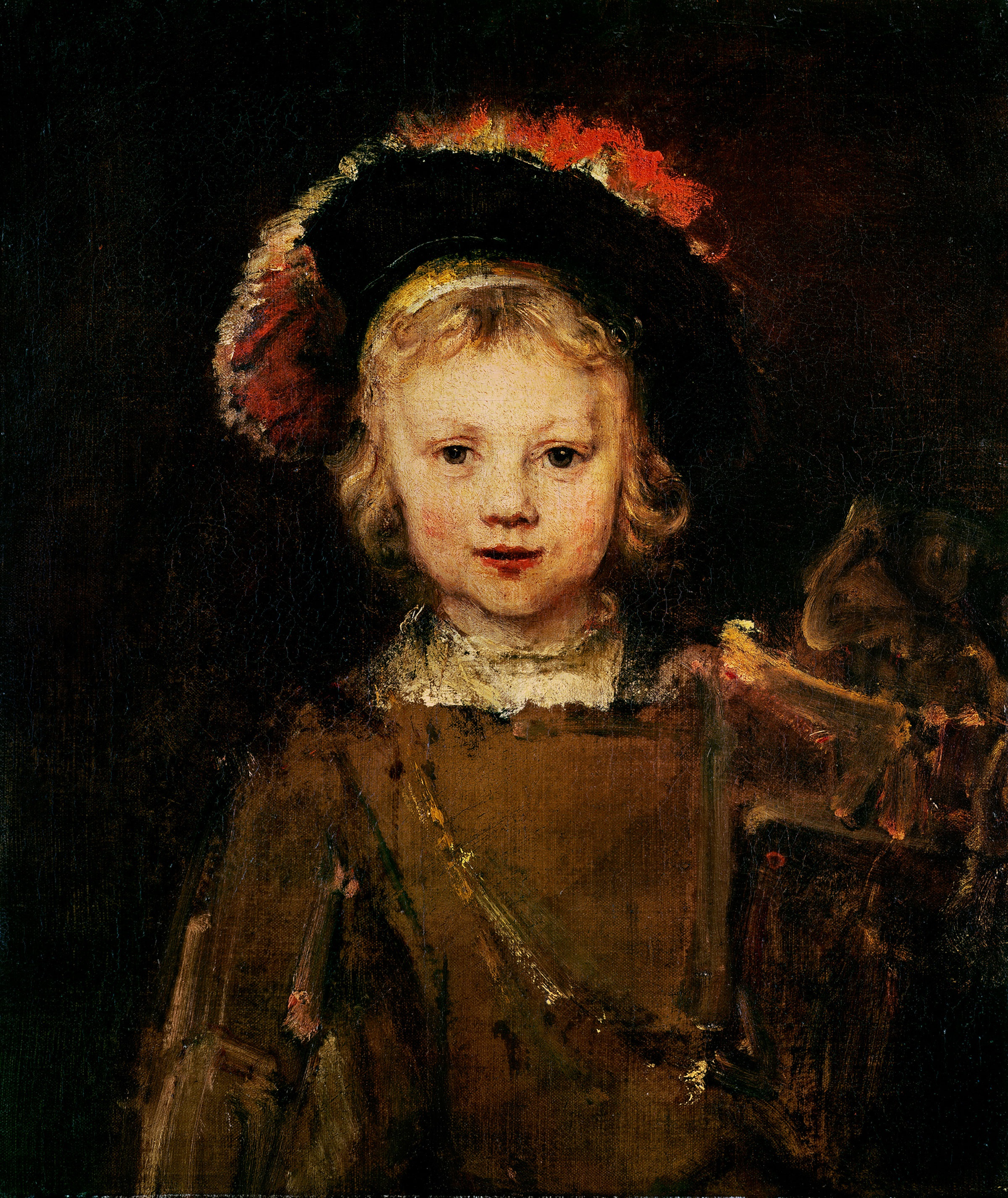
Rembrandt, Portrait of a Boy in a Fancy Costume, c. 1655

The museum's early Baroque paintings from Italy and Spain are represented by such noted artists as Guido Reni, Guercino, Murillo and Zurbarán. The Northern Baroque collection is profoundly expressed in the works of Peter Paul Rubens. The remarkable group of 17th-century Dutch genre, portrait and landscape paintings is crowned with three portraits by Rembrandt. Capping off the 17th century are Flemish and German still lifes, and religious landscapes by the French masters Claude Lorrain and Nicolas Poussin. The French component of the 18th century collection contains paintings by Watteau, Fragonard and Boucher, while Italy is represented with capriccios and historic glimpses into the daily life of Rome and Venice with works by Longhi, Pannini, Guardi, Canaletto, and Tiepolo.

=== European art: 19th century ===
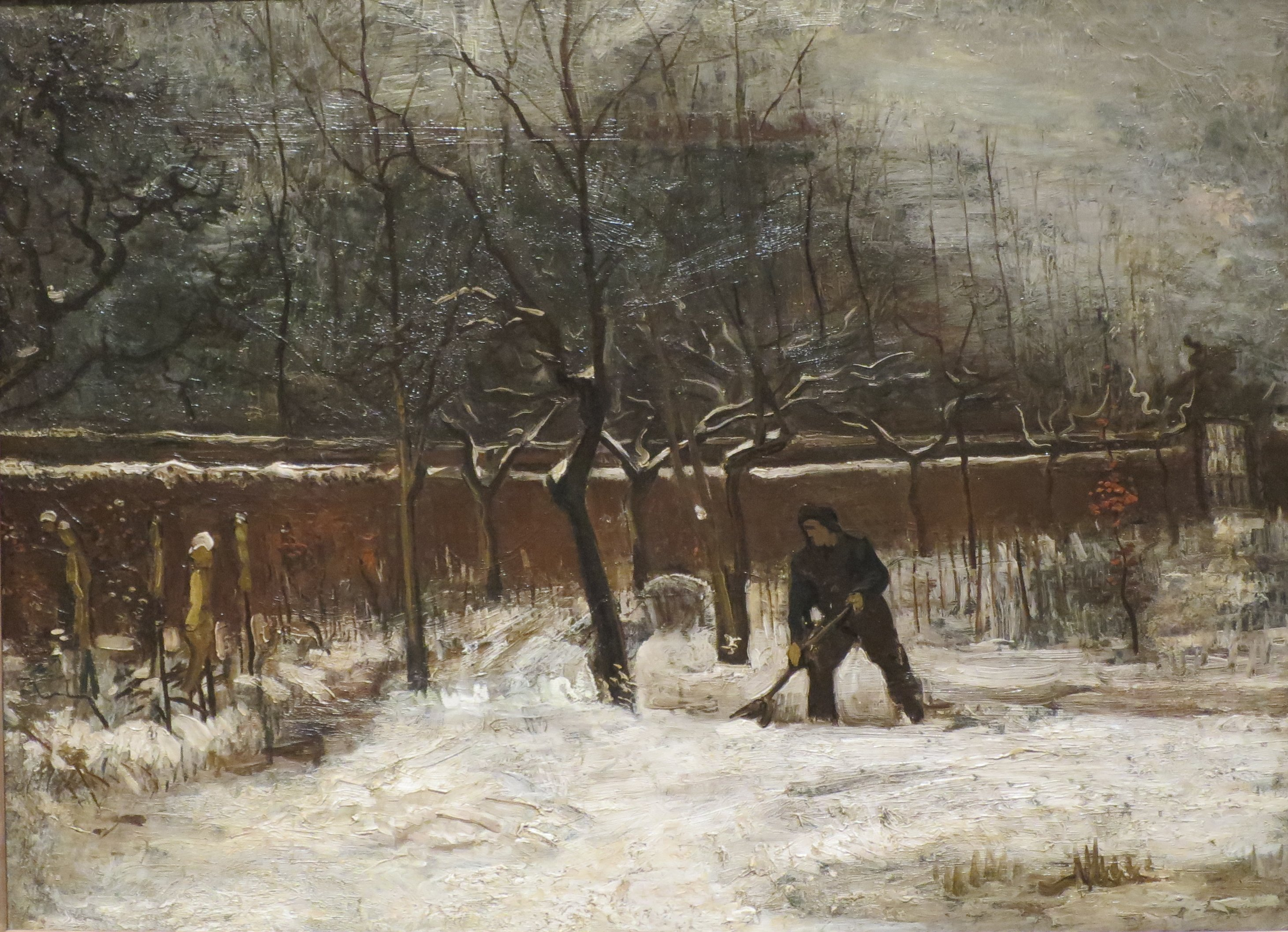
Vincent van Gogh, The Parsonage Garden at Nuenen in the Snow, 1885, (F194)

The museum's paintings by Jean-Auguste-Dominique Ingres and Francisco de Goya mark the beginning of the 19th century and lead to superb examples of mid-century Realism executed by Jean-Baptiste-Camille Corot, Gustave Courbet and Édouard Manet. The museum has the most significant collection of Impressionist and Post-Impressionist art in Southern California. Works by Claude Monet, Pierre-Auguste Renoir and Edgar Degas, who alone is represented by over one hundred works of art, are displayed alongside works by Vincent van Gogh, Paul Cézanne and Paul Gauguin. Complementing these works are Auguste Rodin's monumental bronze sculptures, displayed in the museum's front garden. Outstanding paintings by Édouard Vuillard and Pierre Bonnard lead to the doorstep of 20th-century Modernism.

=== Modern art ===
The museum has an extensive collection of Modern art, with seminal works by Pablo Picasso, Georges Braque, Henri Matisse, and Diego Rivera on permanent view. The "Galka Scheyer collection of works by the Blue Four artists" boasts paintings and works on paper by Paul Klee, Lyonel Feininger, Alexei Jawlensky, and Wassily Kandinsky. Scheyer, a German art dealer and collector who had represented these artists and settled in L.A. in 1925, left 450 works by the Blue Four and other modern artists (plus an archive of 800 documents) to the Pasadena Art Institute after plans had failed to give them to UCLA.

=== Contemporary art ===
The collection of Post-War Contemporary Art, from the Norton Simon Museum's acquisition of the Pasadena Art Museum's building and collections, is noteworthy for its strength in collage, assemblage and sculpture, including works by Joseph Cornell, Robert Rauschenberg, Louise Nevelson, and Ed Kienholz. Pop Art, and Minimal Art are represented by Roy Lichtenstein, Andy Warhol, Donald Judd, and Robert Irwin. Californian art from the 1950s through the 1970s is a particular strength, with artwork by Sam Francis, Richard Diebenkorn, Jay DeFeo, Ronald Davis, Larry Bell, Edward Ruscha, Kenneth Price, Charles Arnoldi, and Ed Moses, Color Field painting and Lyrical Abstraction are represented by Kenneth Noland, Ronnie Landfield, Frank Stella, Helen Frankenthaler, and Kenneth Showell.

=== Sculpture ===
Major sculptors of the 19th century and early 20th century, including Aristide Maillol, Constantin Brâncuși, Henry Moore, Barbara Hepworth, and Isamu Noguchi, are represented by works in bronze, lead and marble sculptures throughout the galleries and outside the museum, including the Front Garden and Colorado Boulevard lawn, as well as the extensive Sculpture Garden grounds.

== Management ==
The Norton Simon is organized as an operating foundation, devoting its resources to its own public benefit activities. The operating budget is about $6 million. The museum building, which is owned by the board of trustees, stands on land leased from the City of Pasadena for $1 a year. The 75-year lease runs until 2050. Negotiations in the past included possible moves to San Francisco and UCLA, as well as an affiliation with the J. Paul Getty Trust.

Jennifer Jones' Hollywood connections brought members of the film and television community, including Billy Wilder, Gregory Peck, Cary Grant, David Geffen, Tom Brokaw, and Candice Bergen, to the Norton Simon's museum board.

== Gallery ==
Selected art images of Norton Simon Museum.

Fra Angelico Madonna and Child, c. 1430

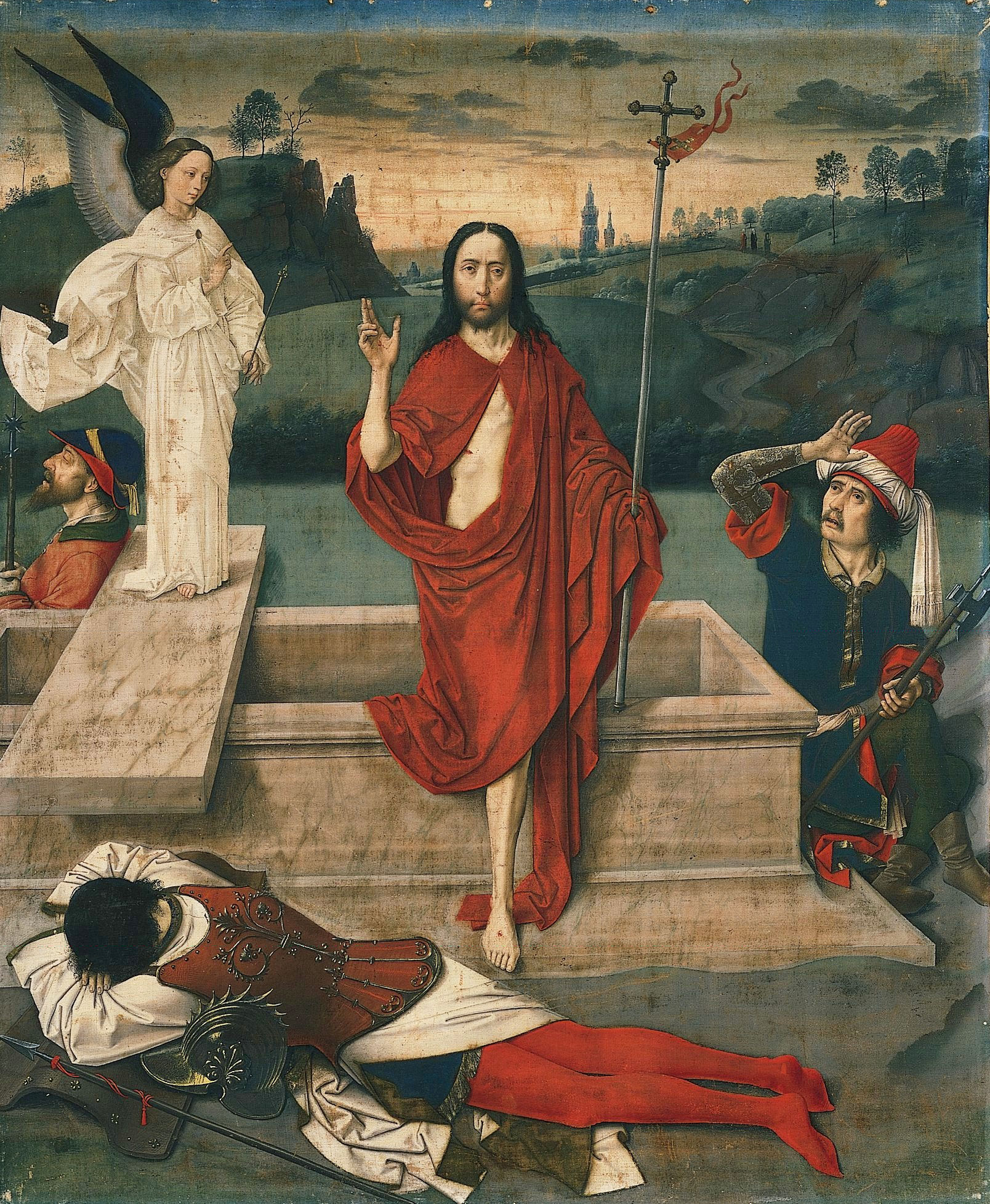
Dieric Bouts, Resurrection, 1455

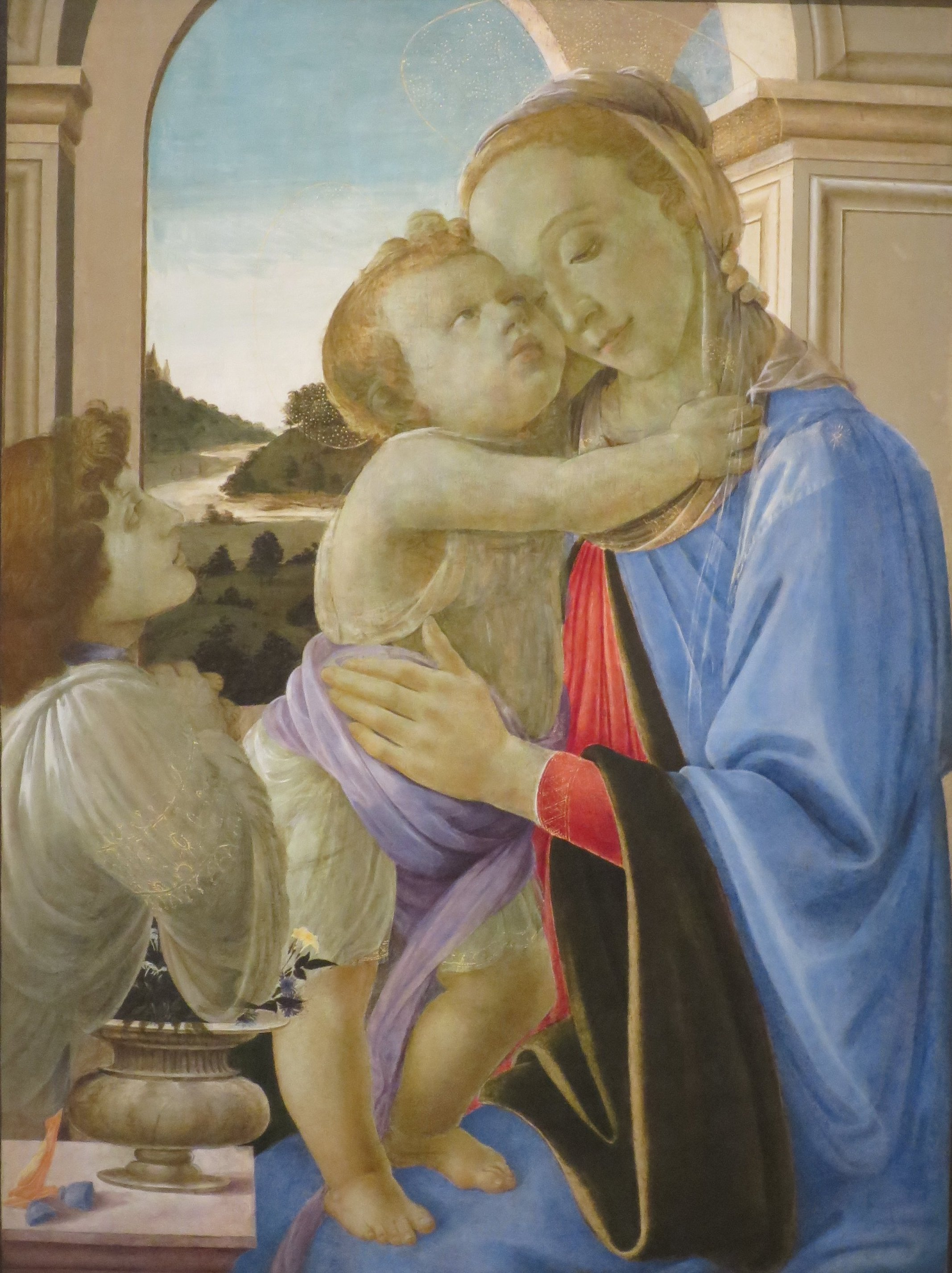
Sandro Botticelli, Madonna and Child with Adoring Angel, 1468

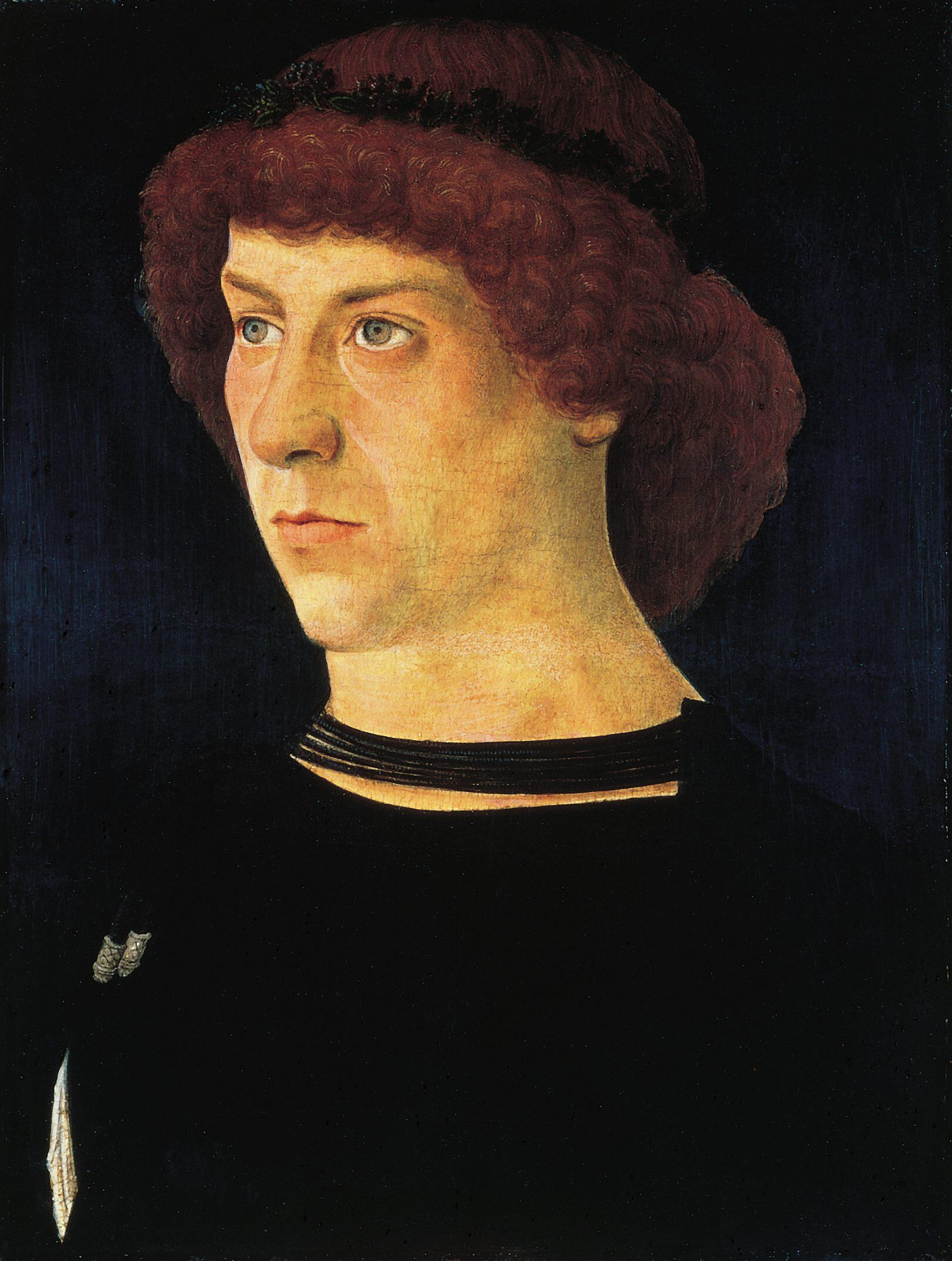
Giovanni Bellini Portrait of Joerg Fugger, 1474

Hans Memling Christ Giving His Blessing 1478

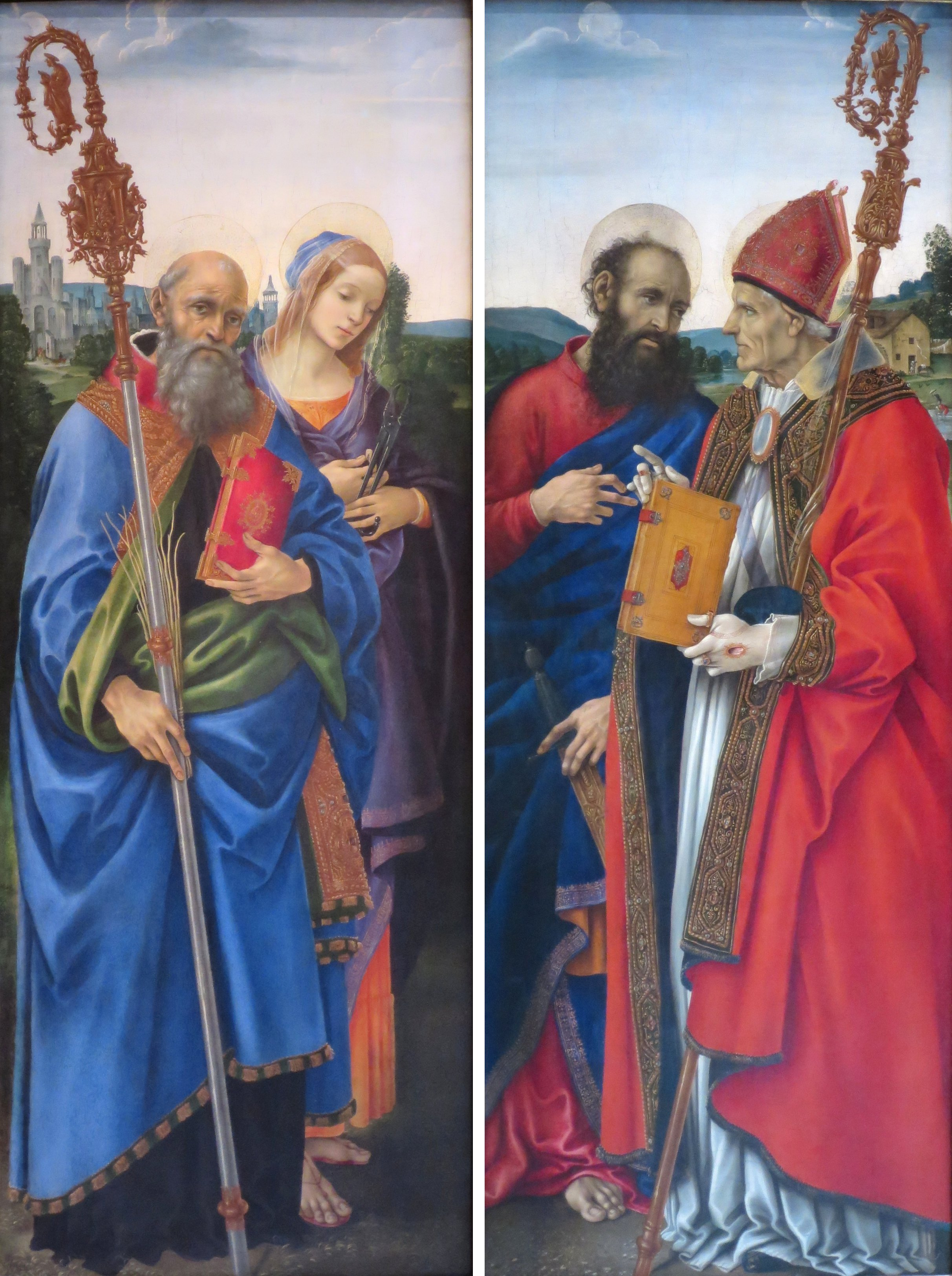
Filippino Lippi Saints Benedict and Apollonia and Saints Paul and Frediano, 1483

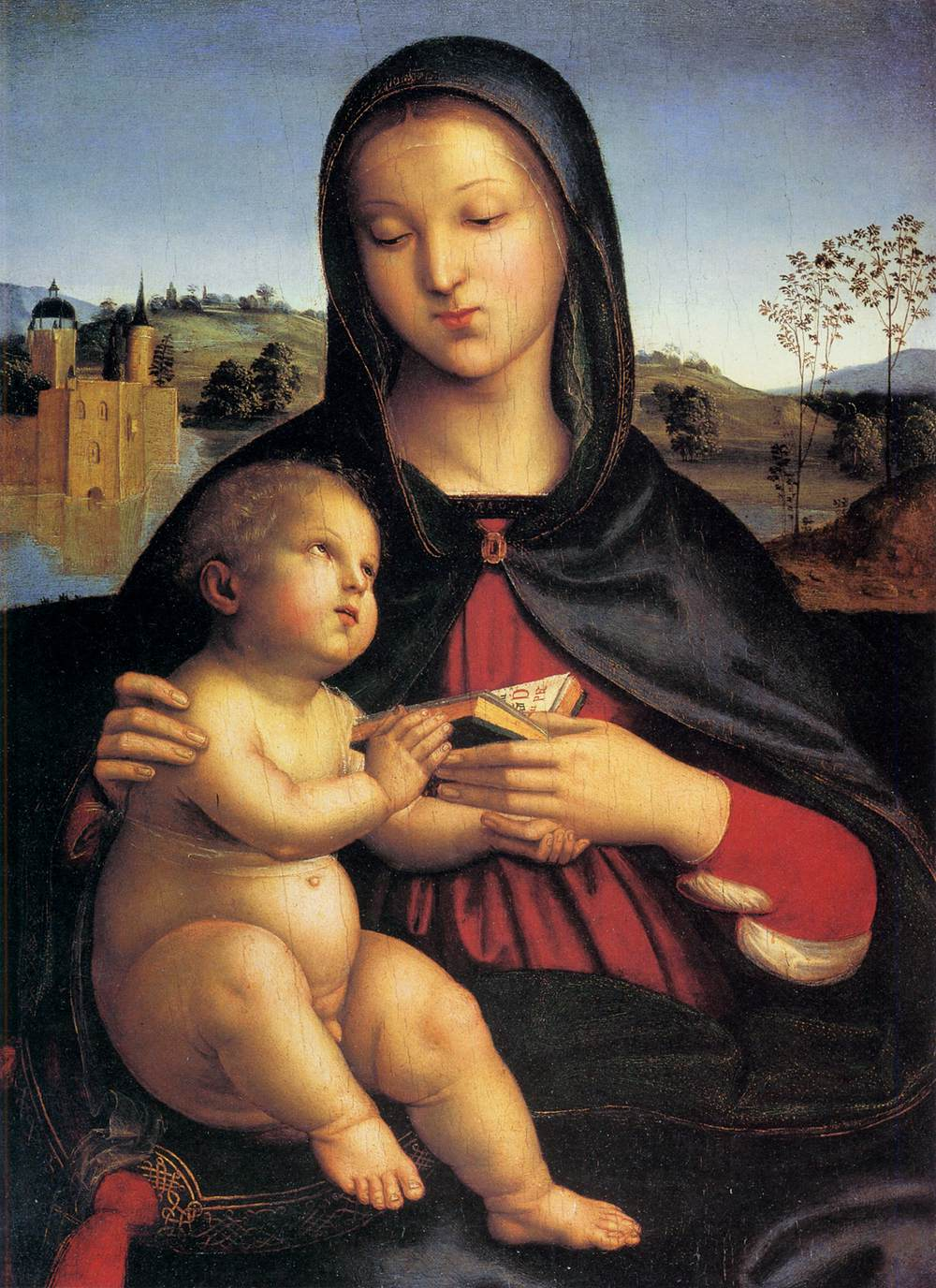
Raphael, Madonna and Child with the Book, 1503

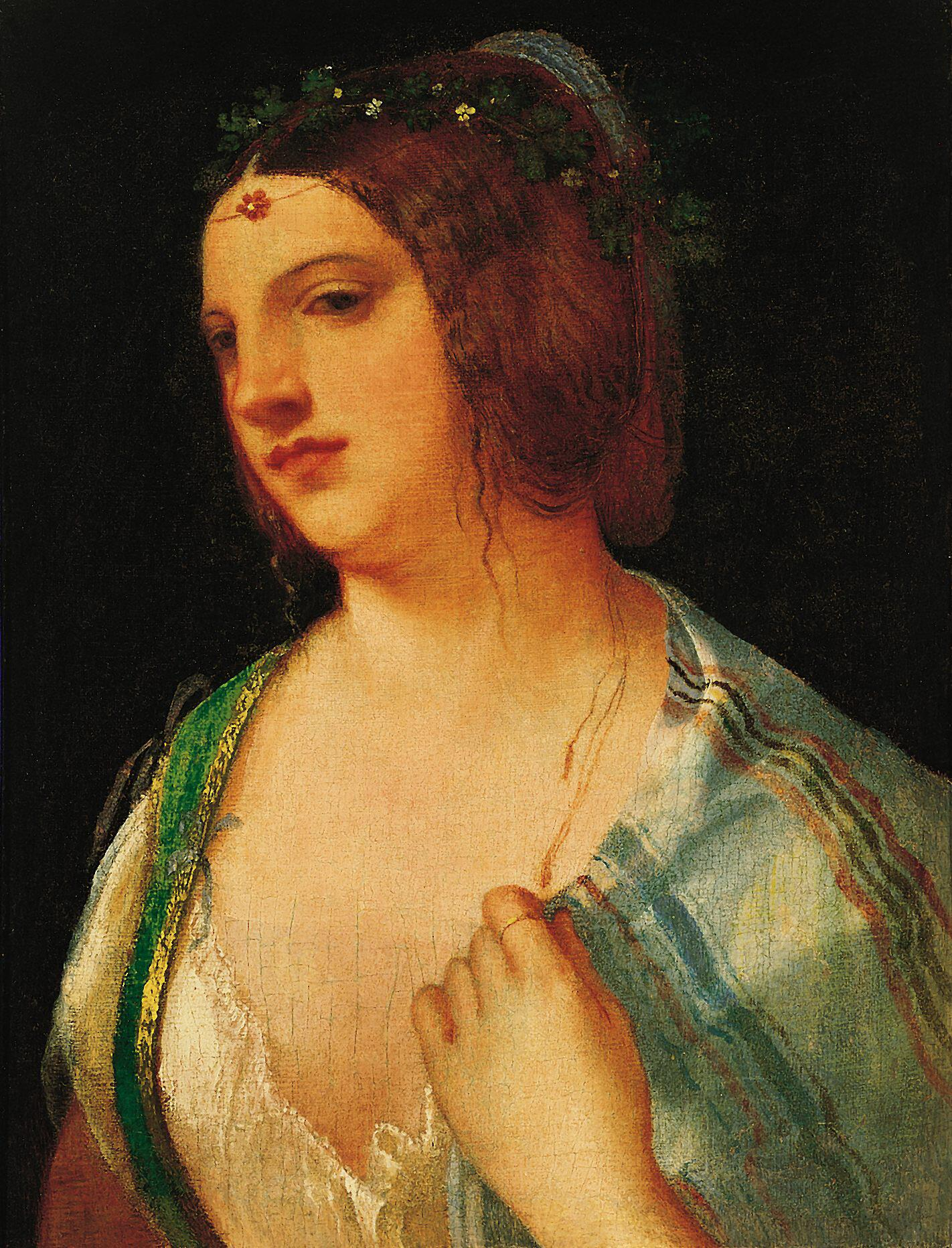
Giorgione Head of a Venetian Girl, c. 1509

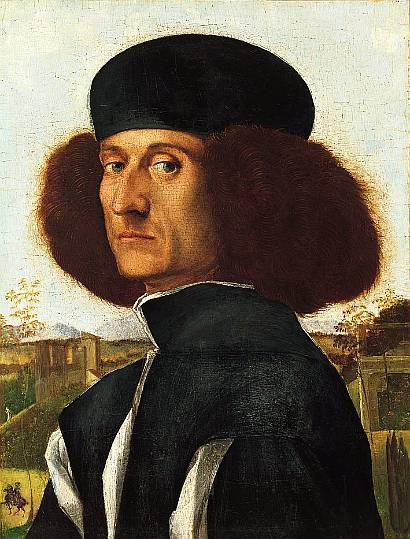
Vittore Carpaccio Portrait of a Venetian Nobleman, c. 1510

Gerard David Coronation of the Virgin, 1515

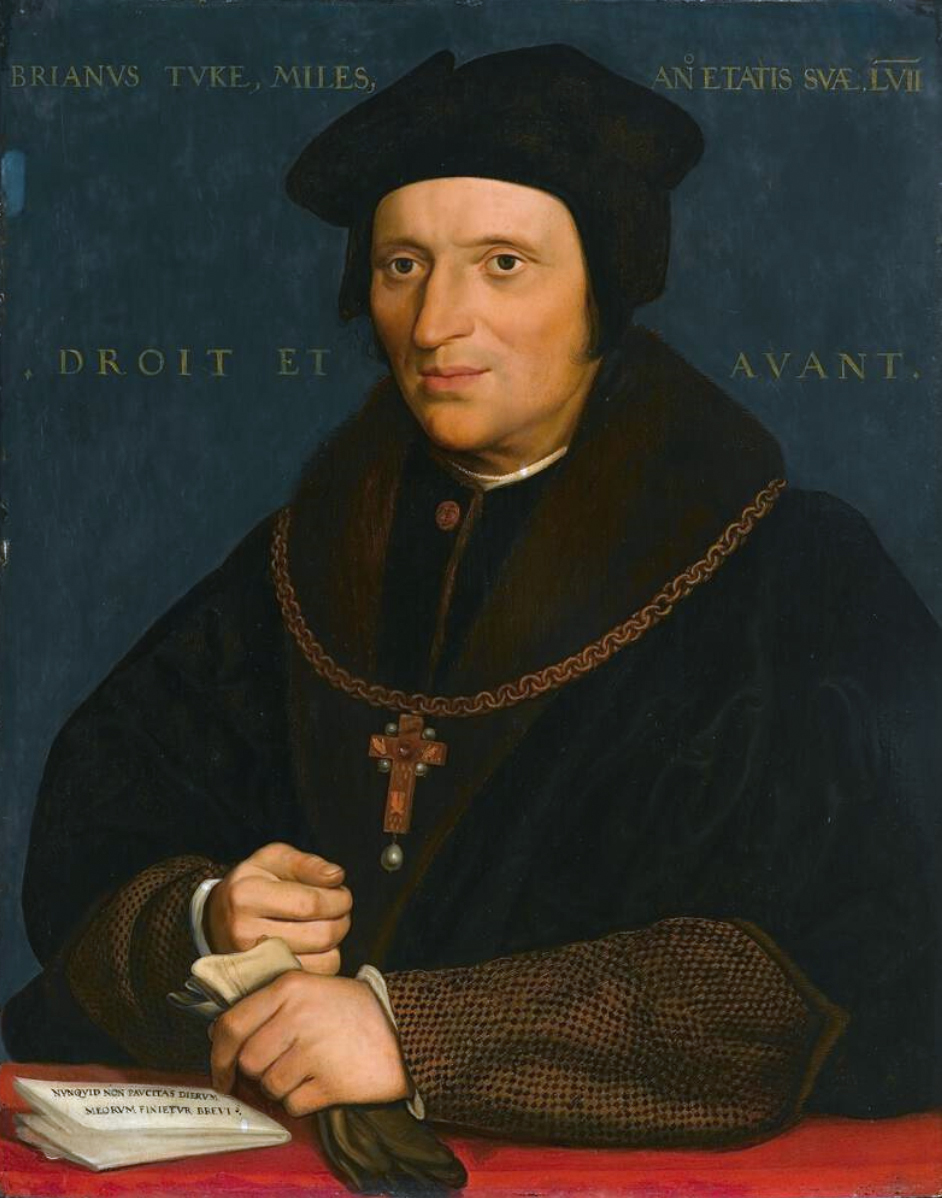
Hans Holbein the Younger Portrait of Sir Bryan Tuke, c. 1527

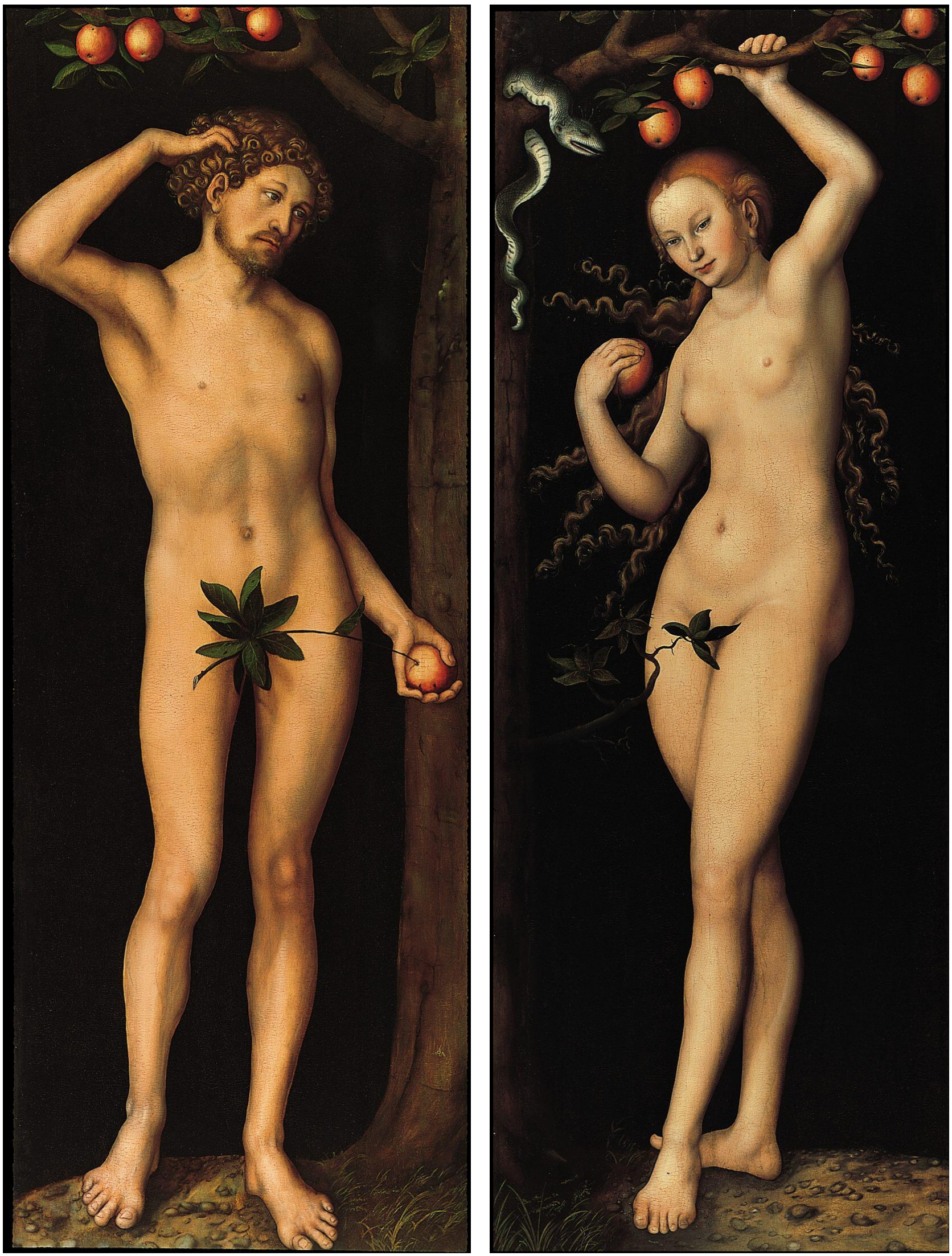
Lucas Cranach the Elder Adam and Eve, c. 1530

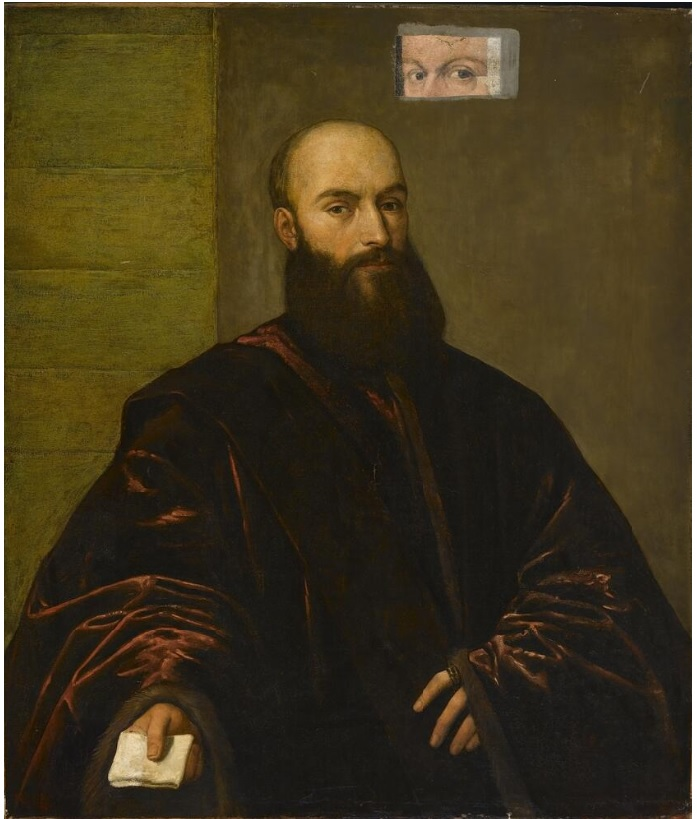
Titian Portrait of a Venetian Gentleman, 1530

El Greco Manusso Theotokopoulos, c. 1603

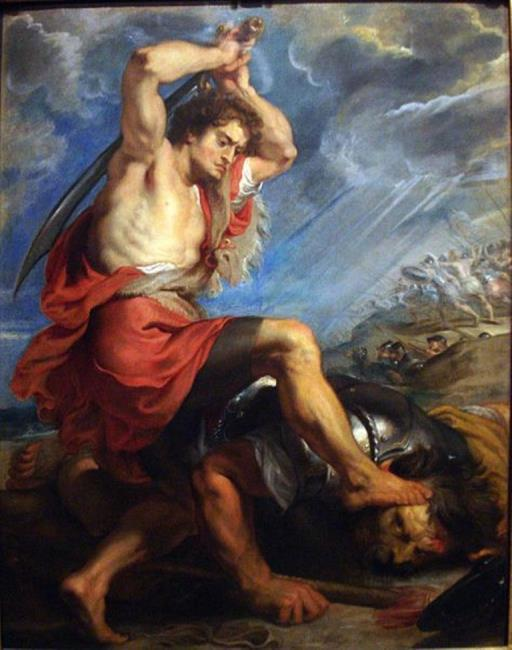
Peter Paul Rubens David Slaying Goliath, c. 1615

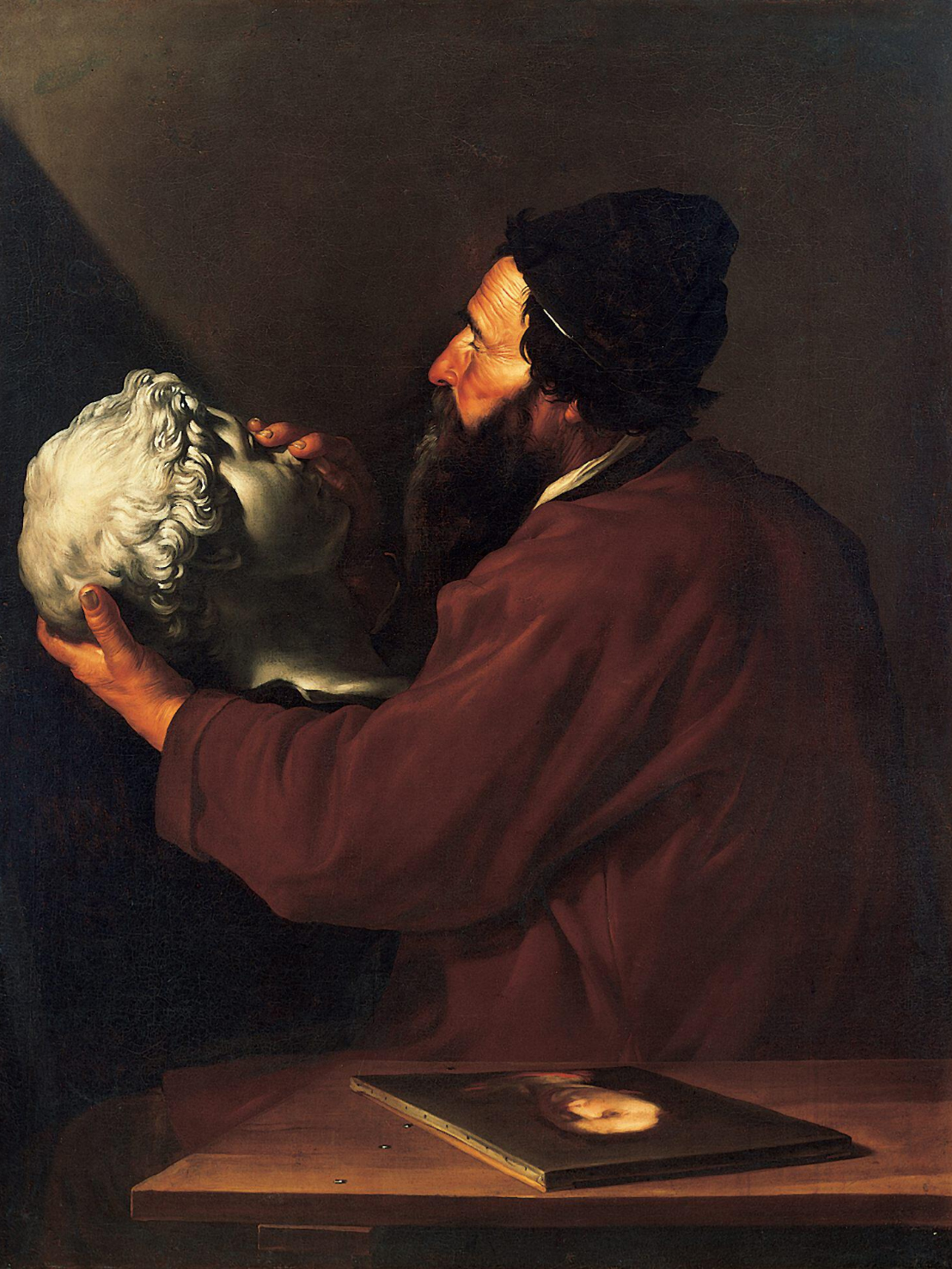
Jusepe de Ribera El sentido del tacto , c. 1615–16

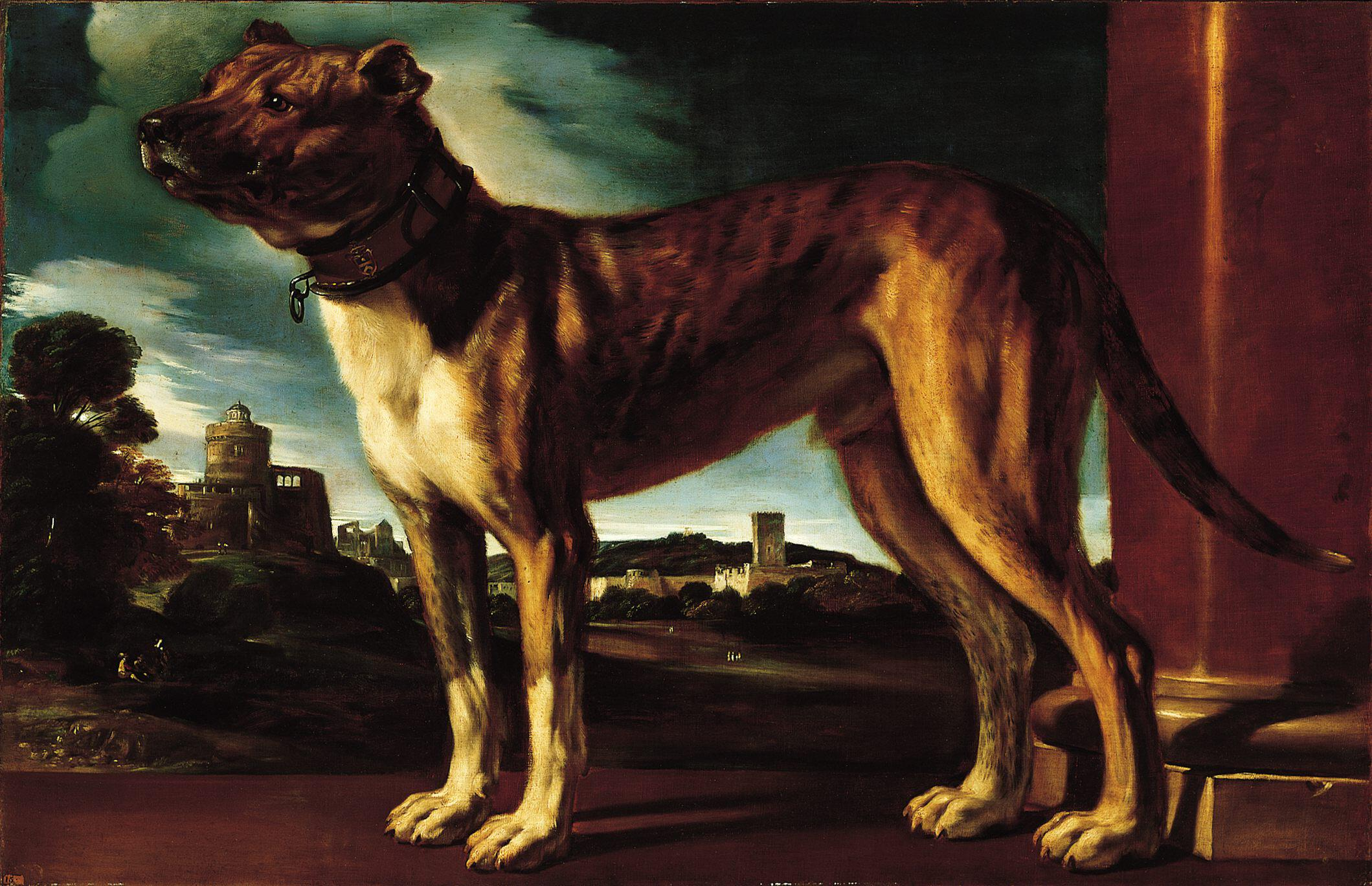
Guercino Aldrovani Dog, c. 1625

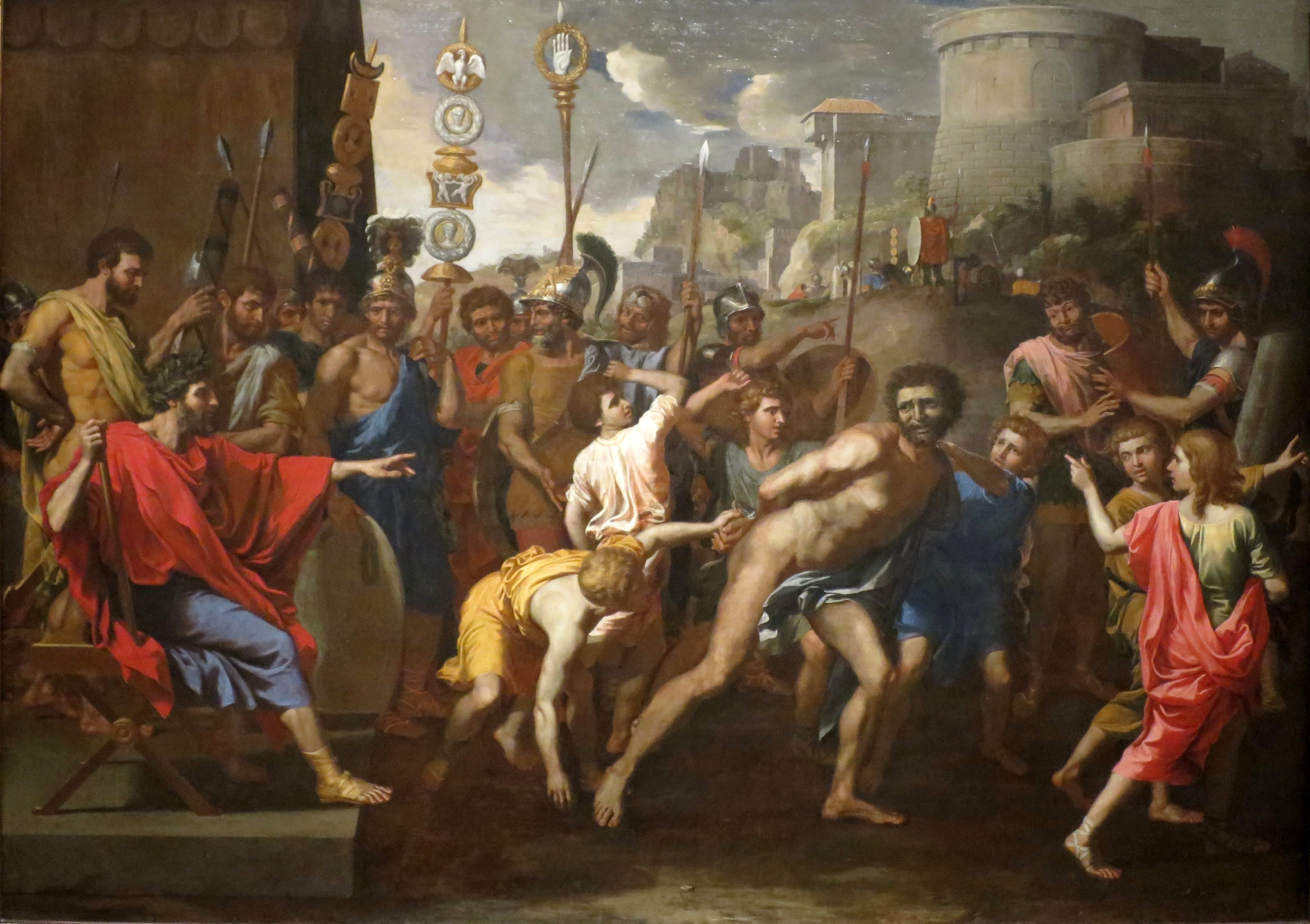
Nicolas Poussin Camillus and the Schoolmaster of Falerii c. 1635–40

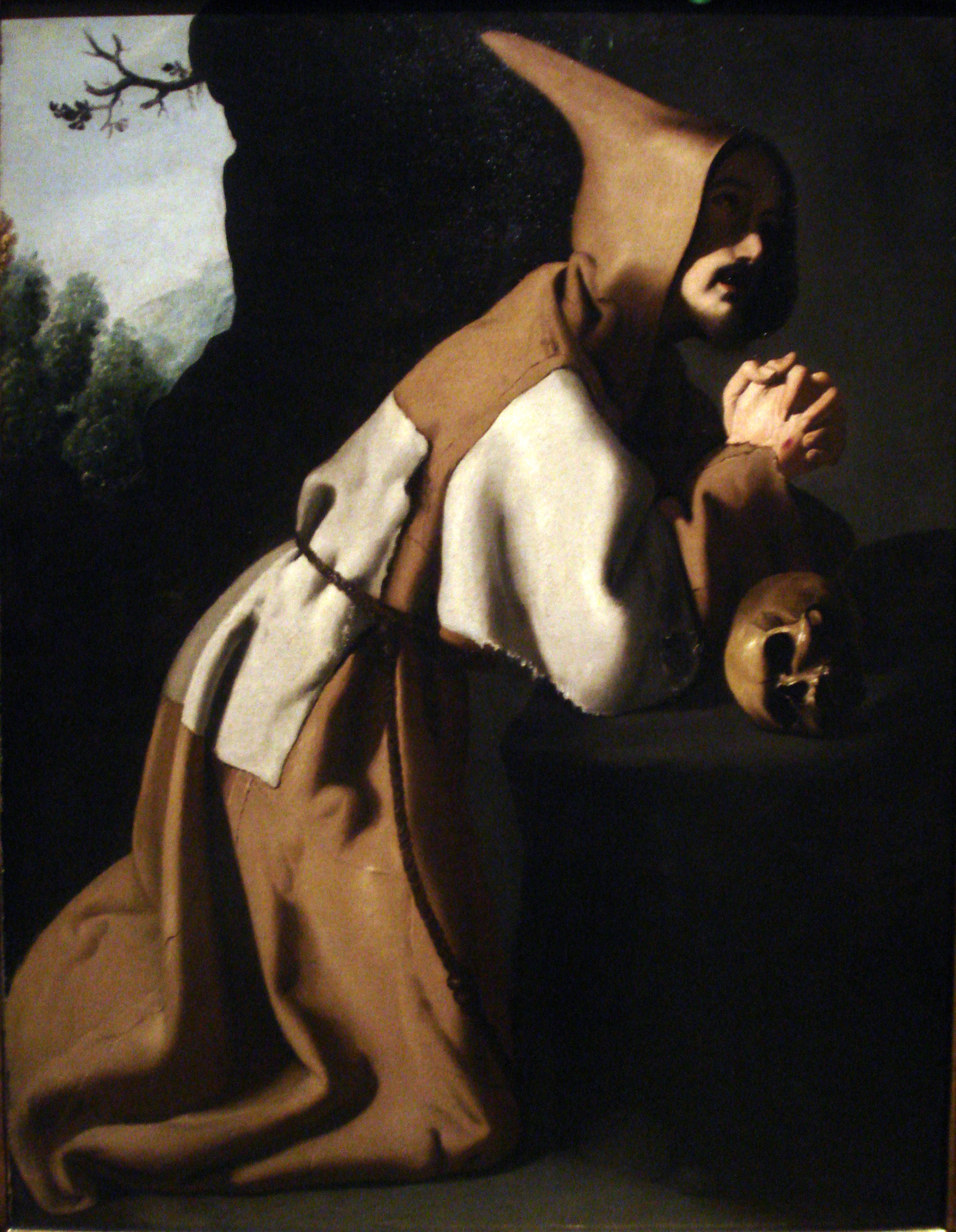
Francisco de Zurbarán Saint Francis in Prayer, c. 1638–1639

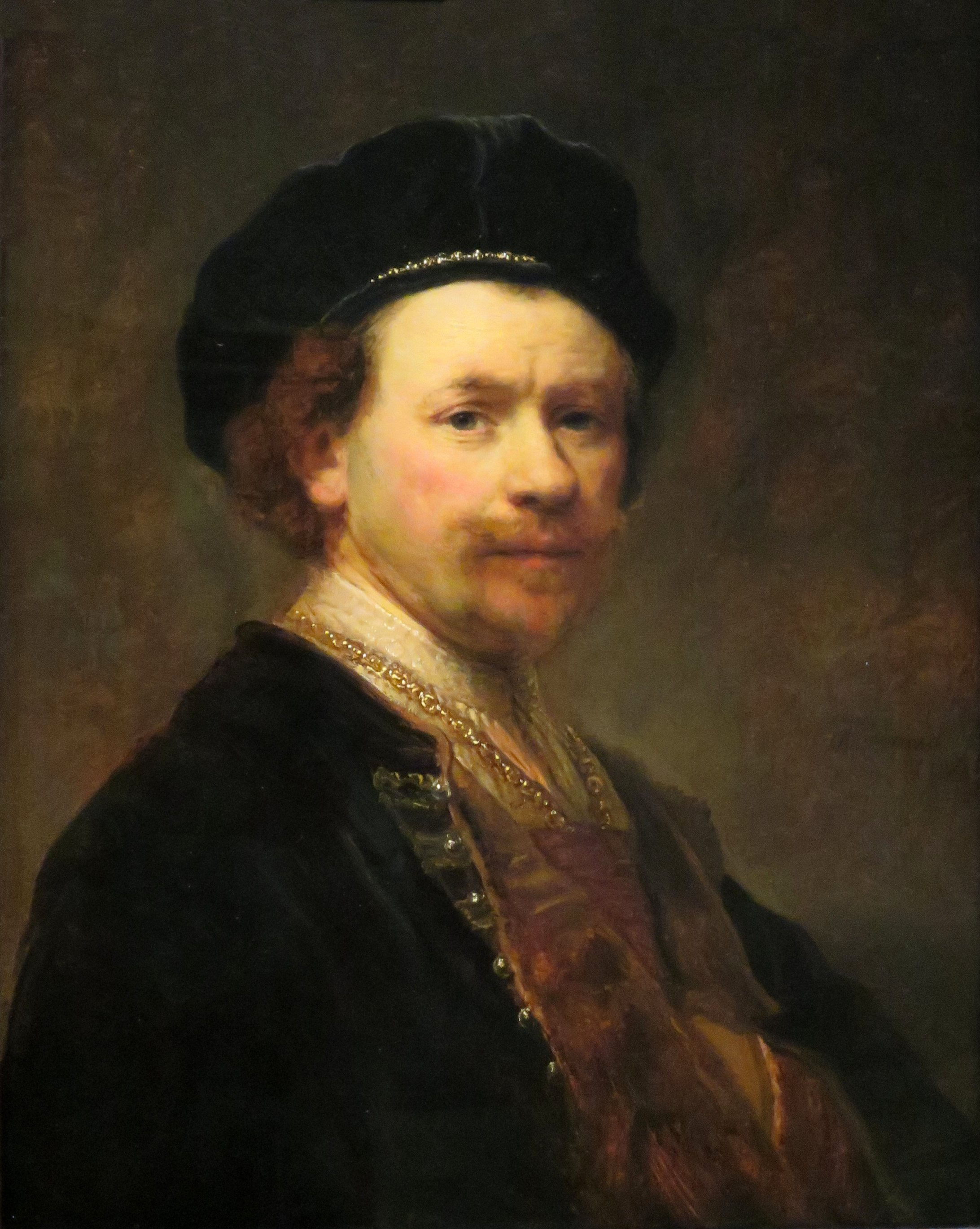
Rembrandt Selfportrait c. 1649

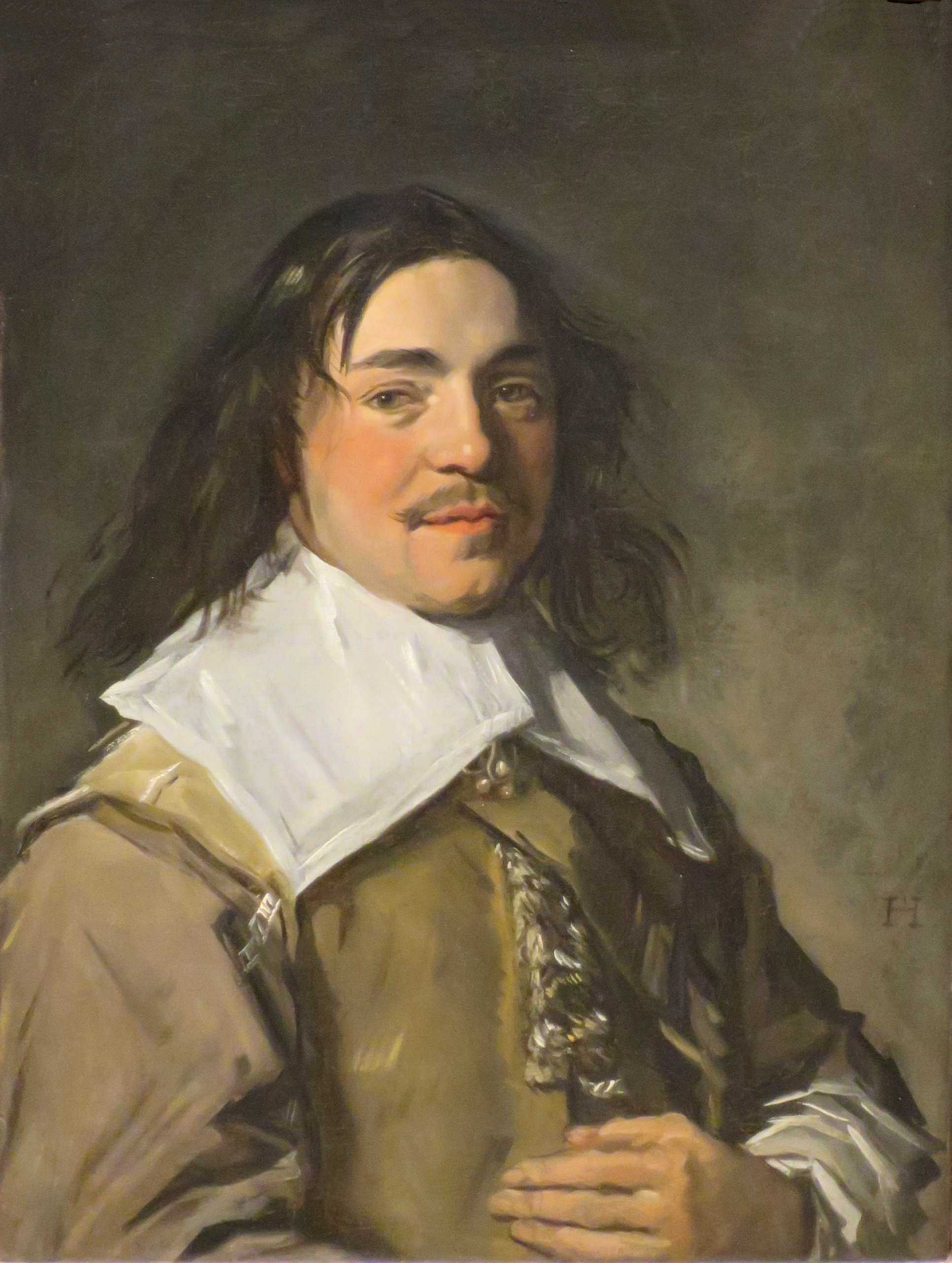
Frans Hals Portrait of a Young Man, 1650

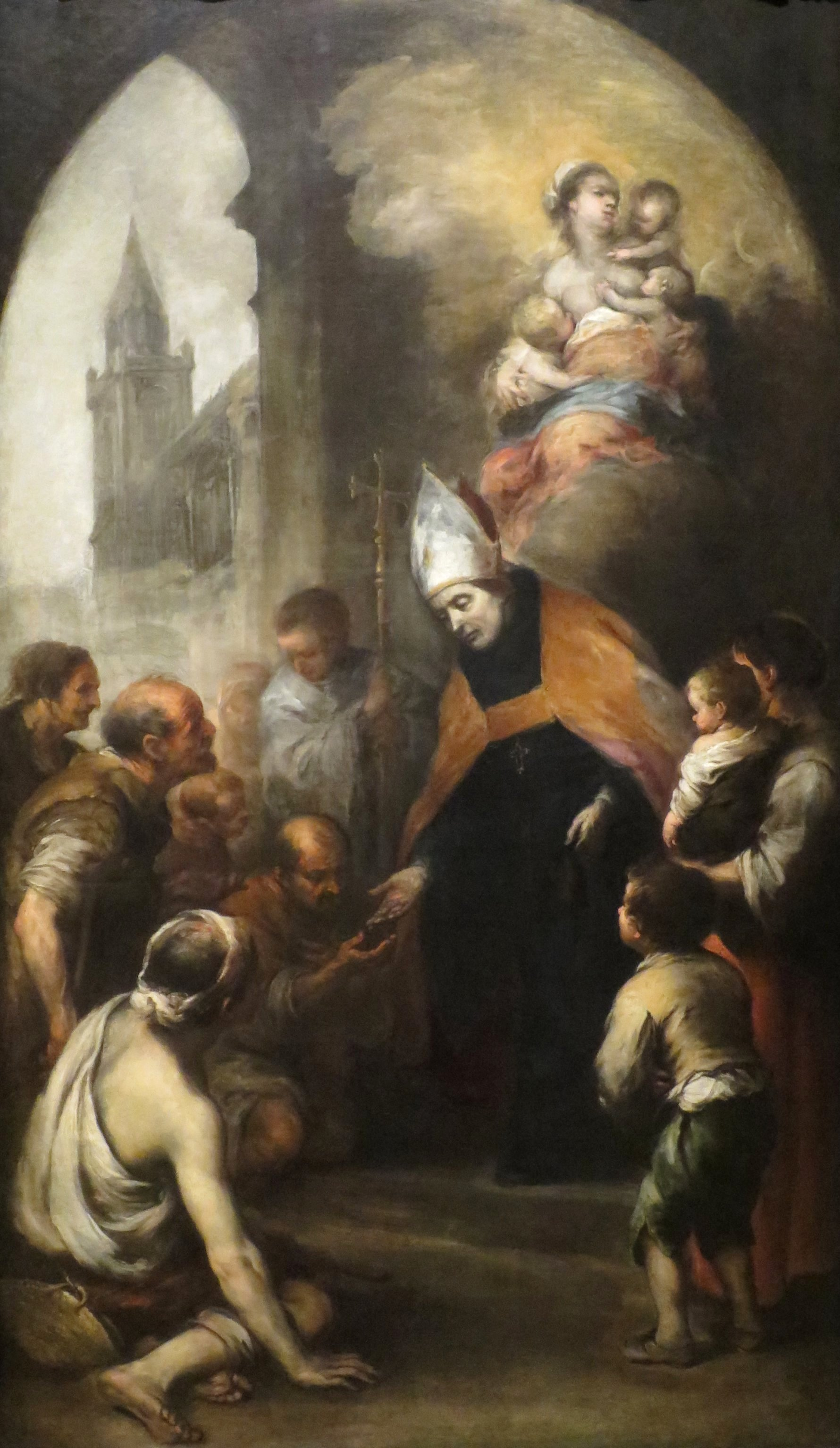
Murillo St. Thomas Giving Alms, c. 1665–70

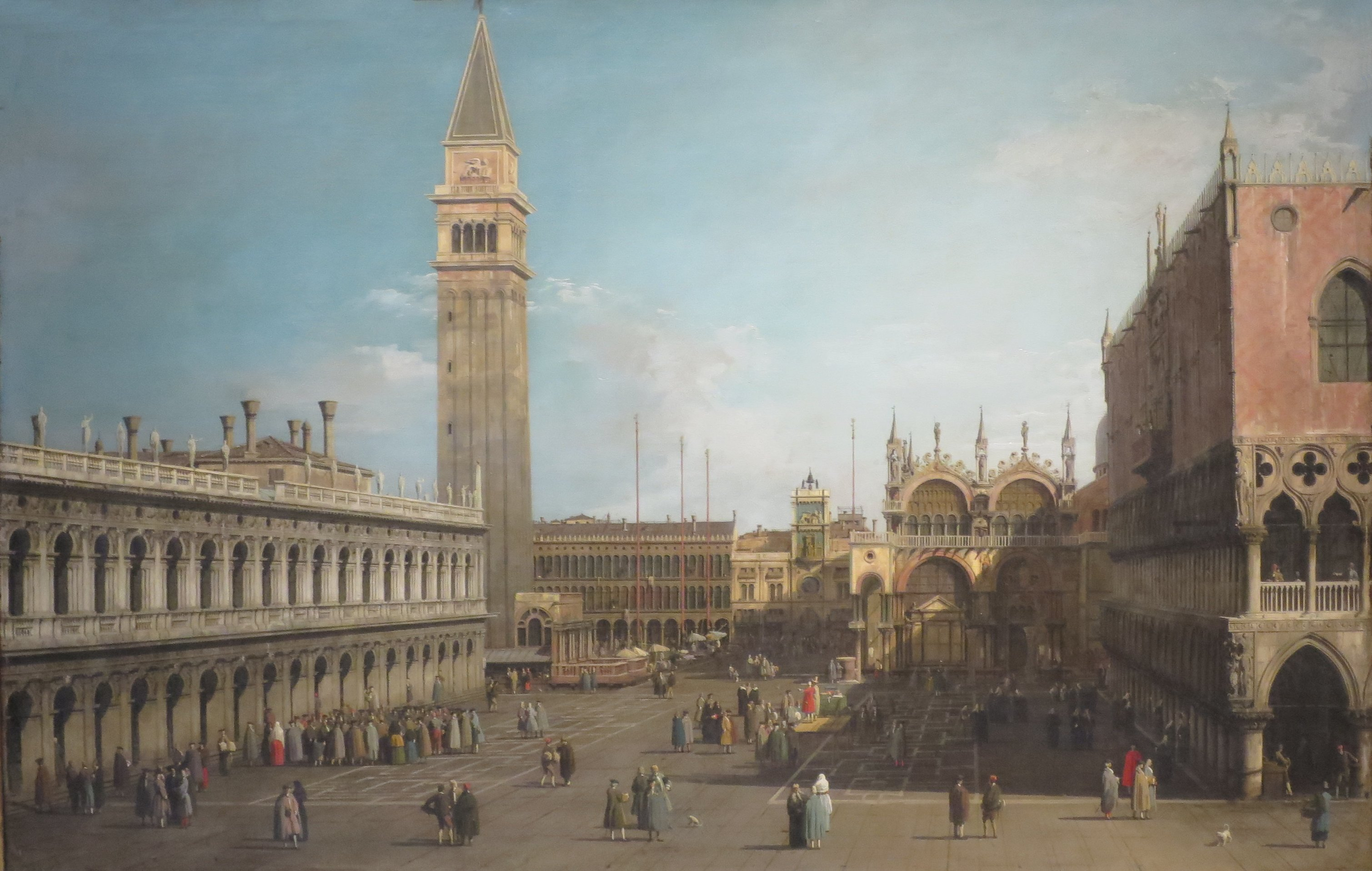
Canaletto The Piazzetta, Venice, Looking North, 1740

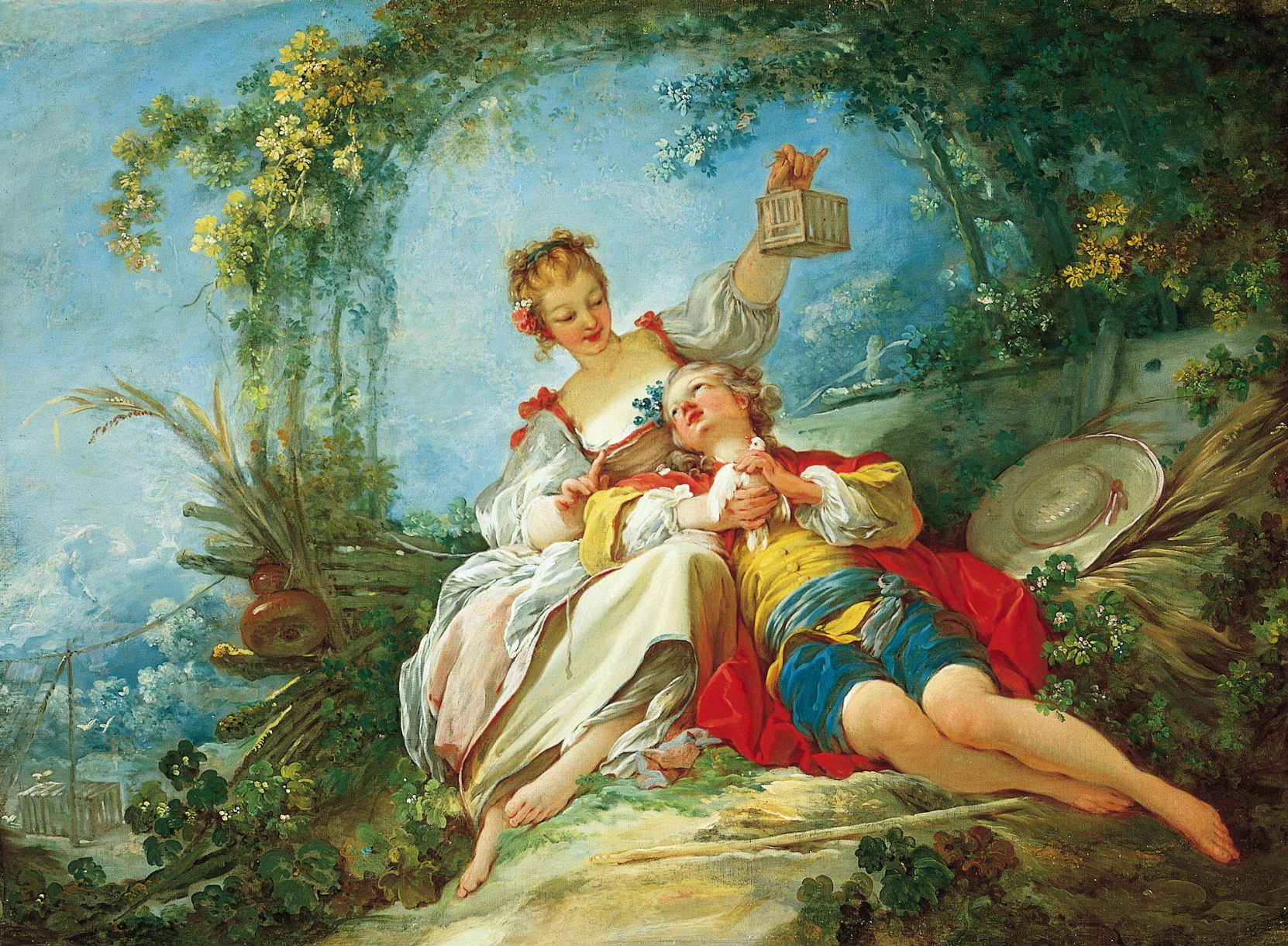
Jean-Honoré Fragonard Happy Lovers, c. 1751–1755

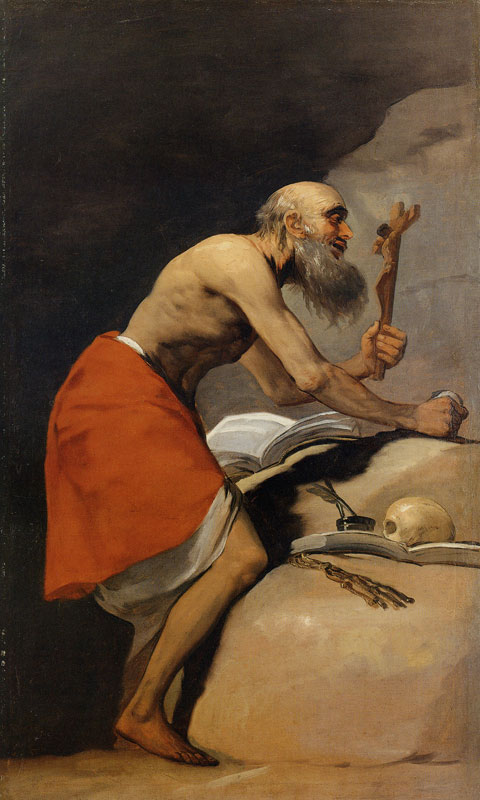
Francisco Goya Saint Jerome in Penitence, 1798

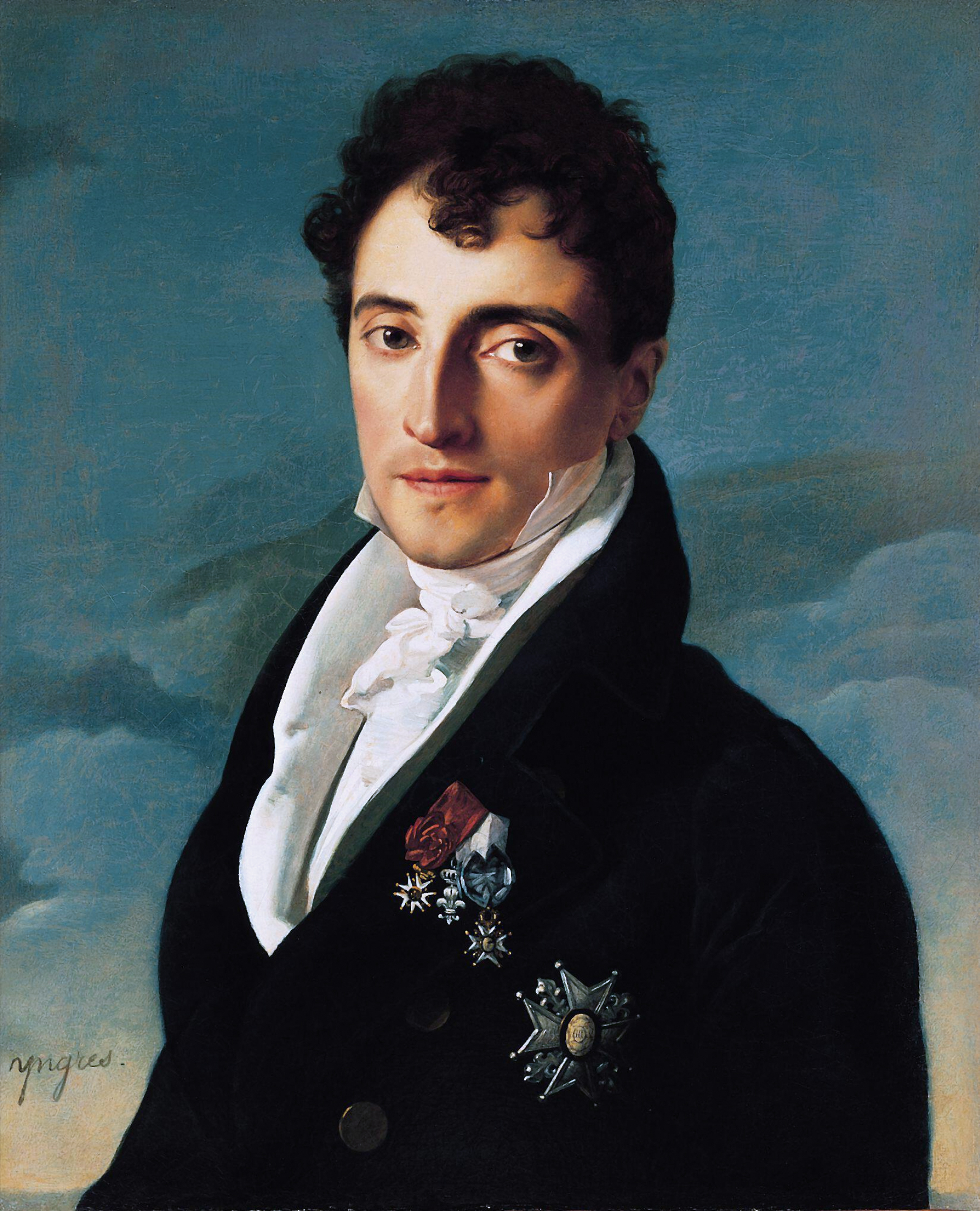
Jean-Auguste-Dominique Ingres Baron Joseph-Pierre Vialetès de Mortarieu, 1805

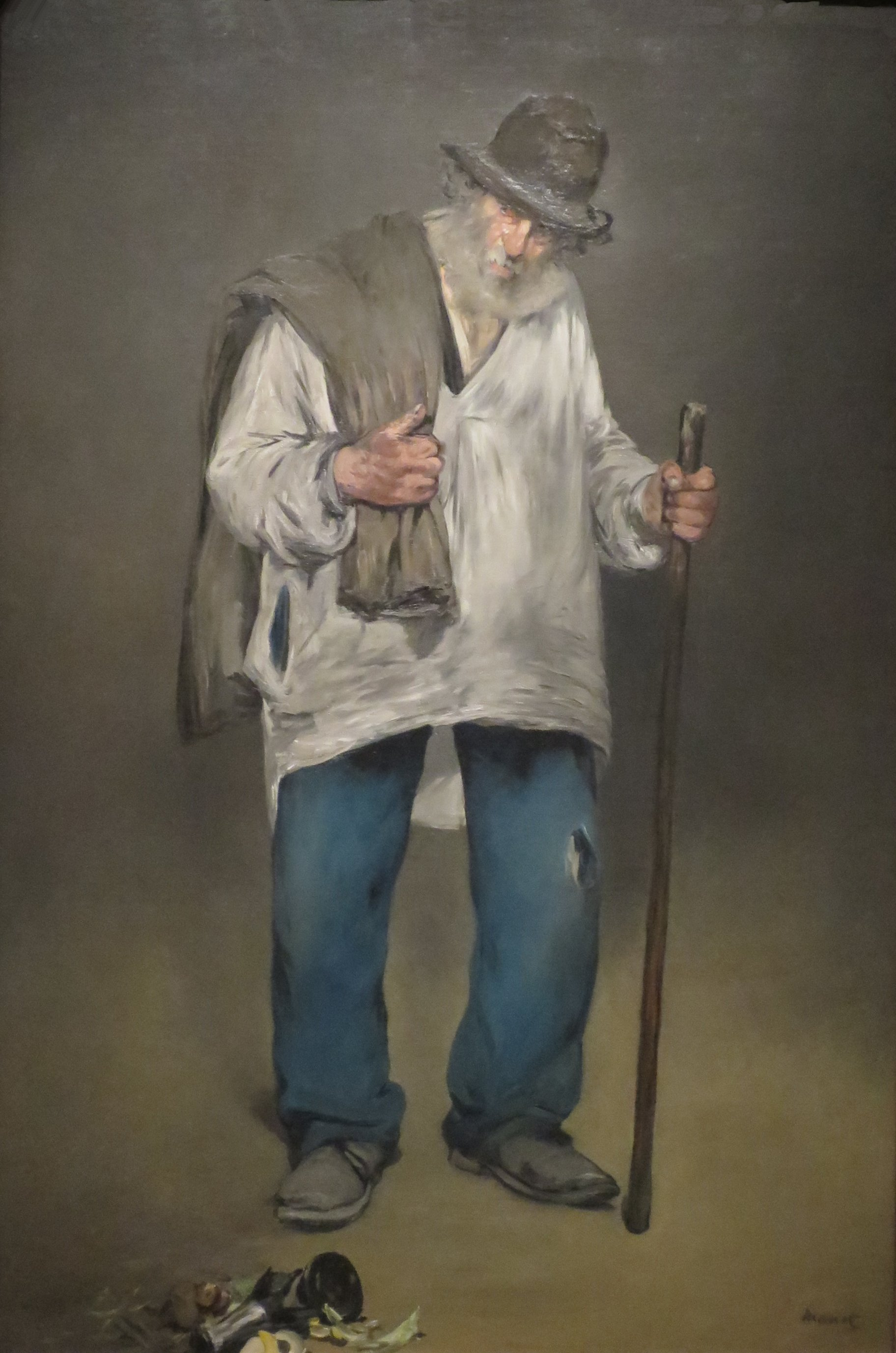
Édouard Manet, The Ragpicker, 1869

Pierre-Auguste Renoir Nude, c.1872

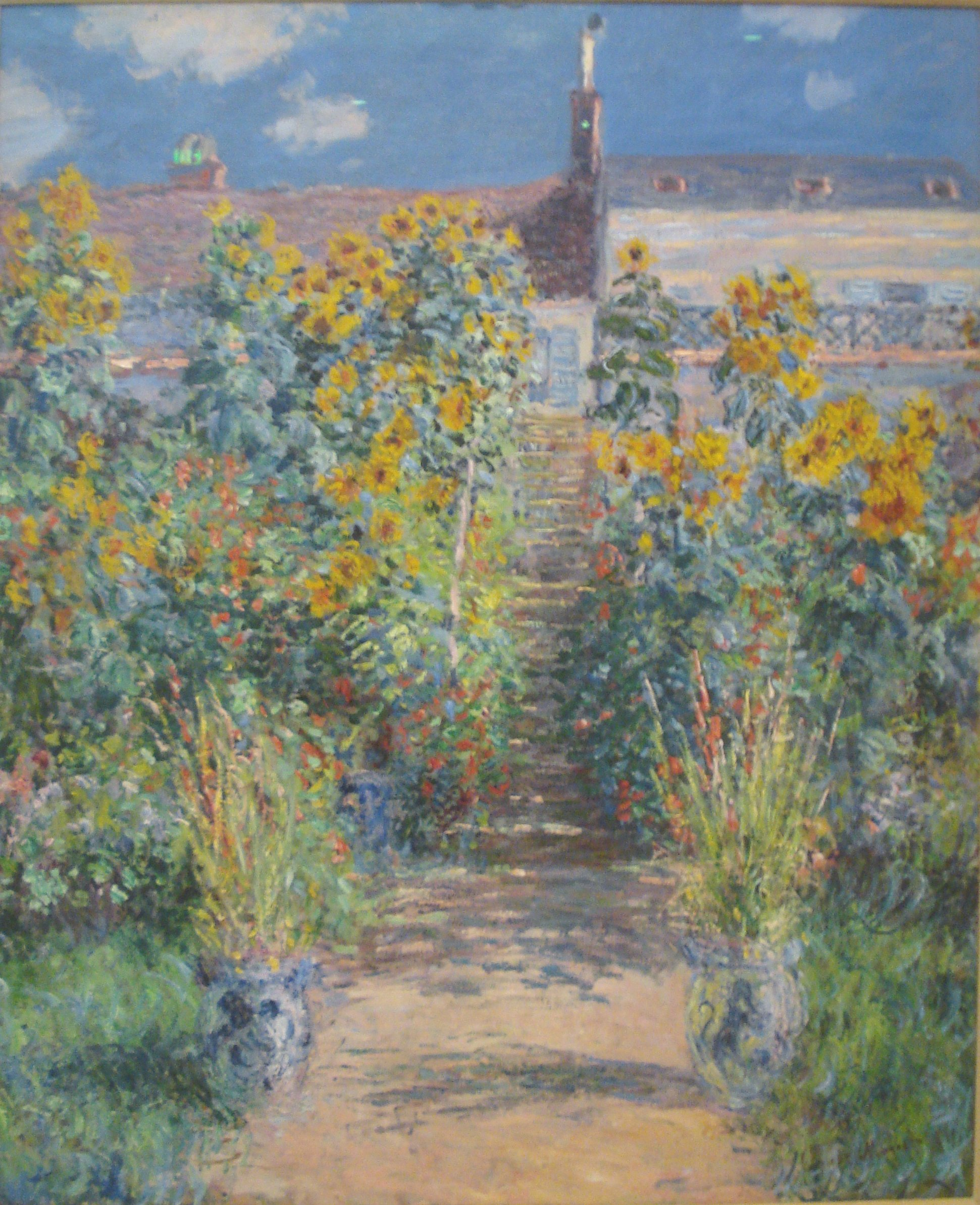
Claude Monet, The Artist's Garden at Vétheuil 1881

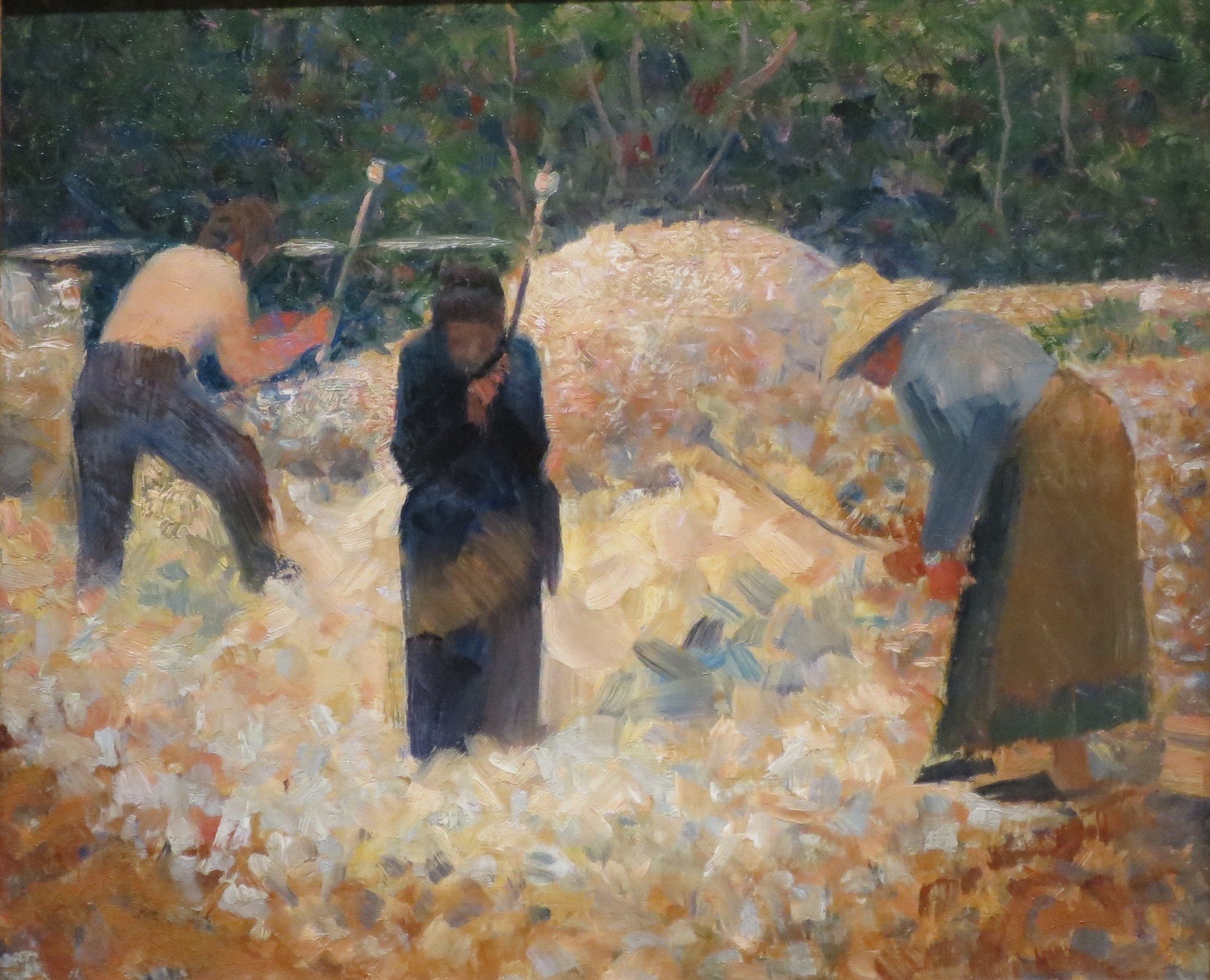
Georges Seurat The Stone Breakers, Le Raincy, 1882

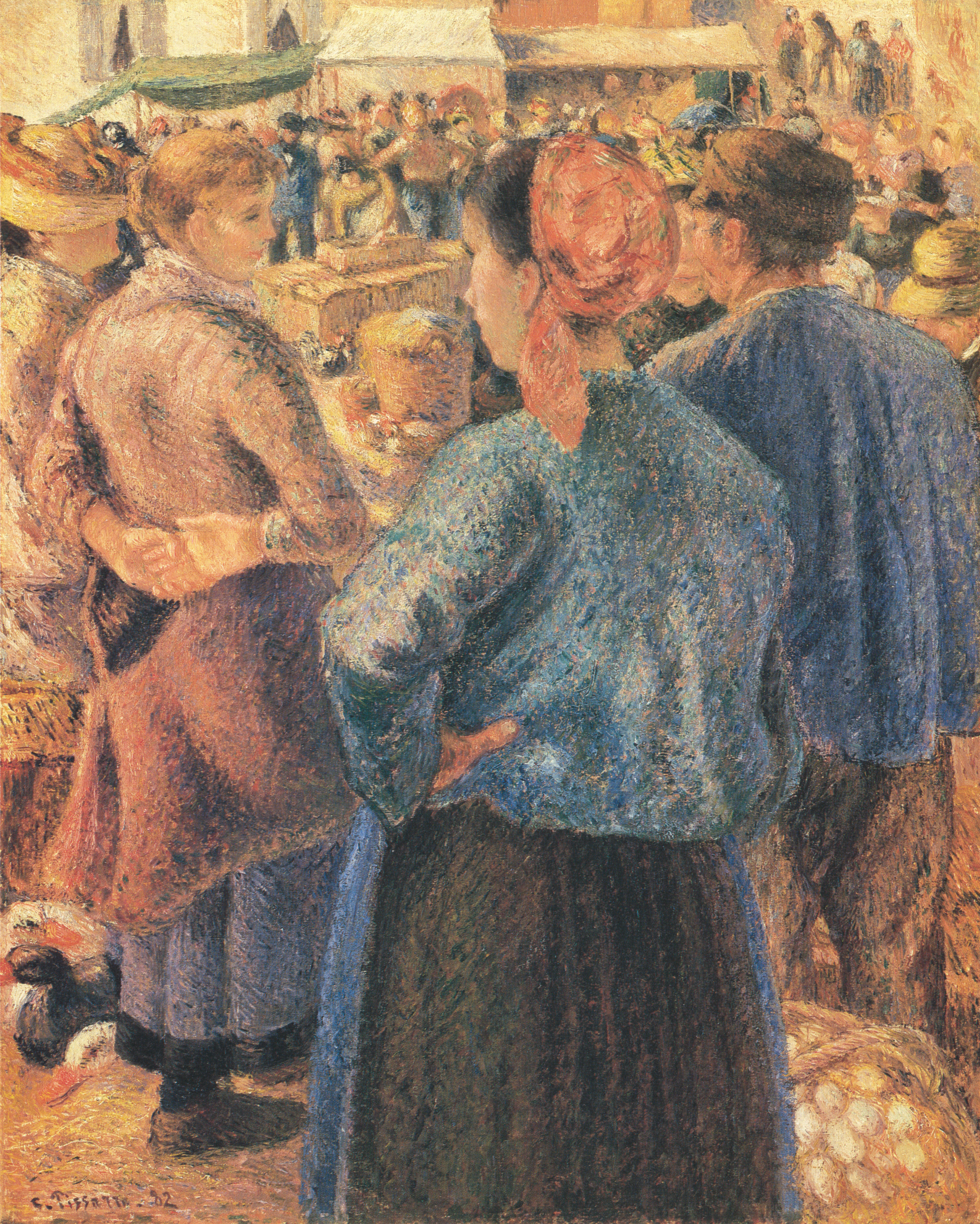
Camille Pissarro The Poultry Market at Pontoise, 1882

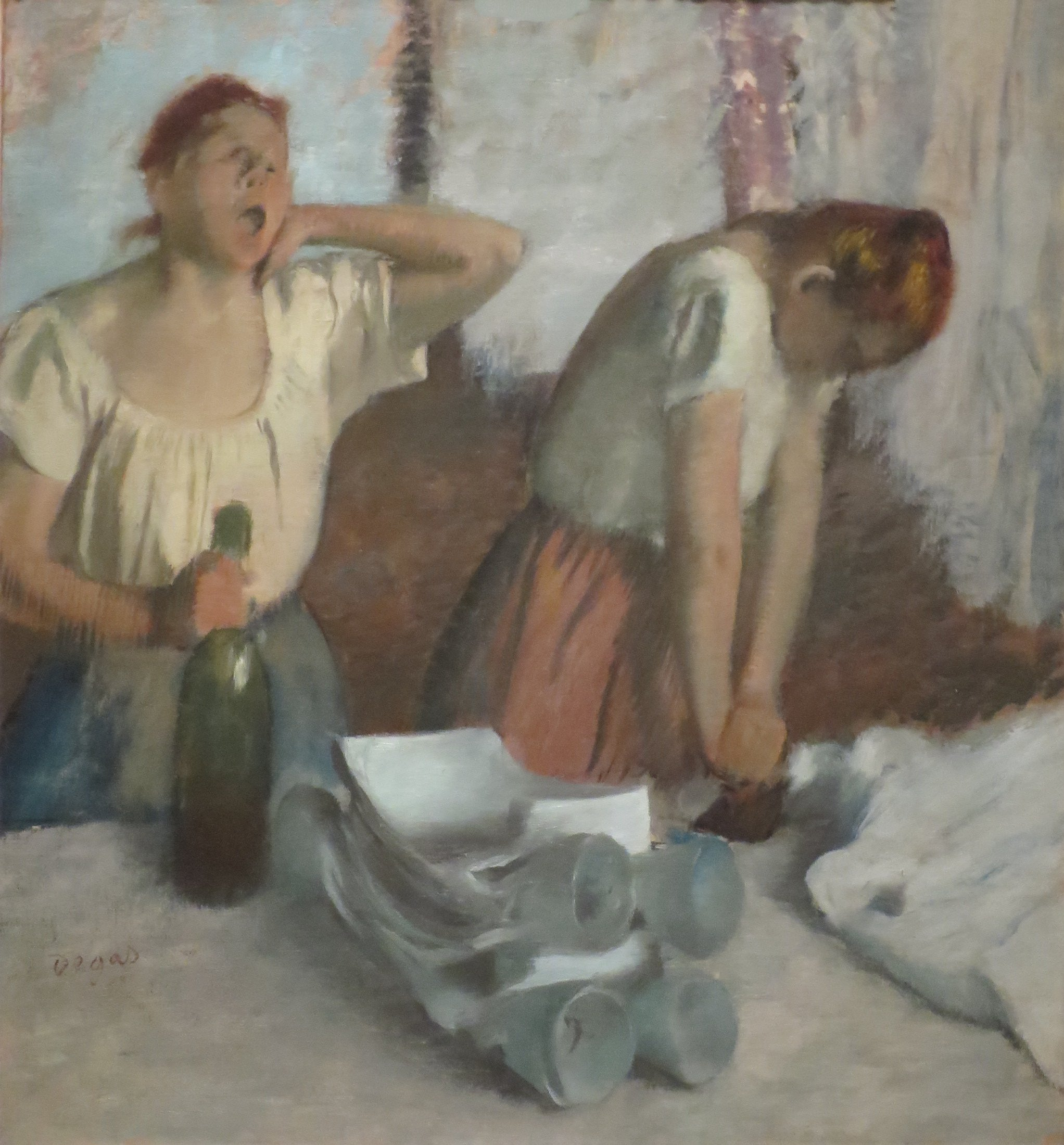
Edgar Degas, Women Ironing, 1884

Paul Cézanne Tulips in a Vase, 1888-1890

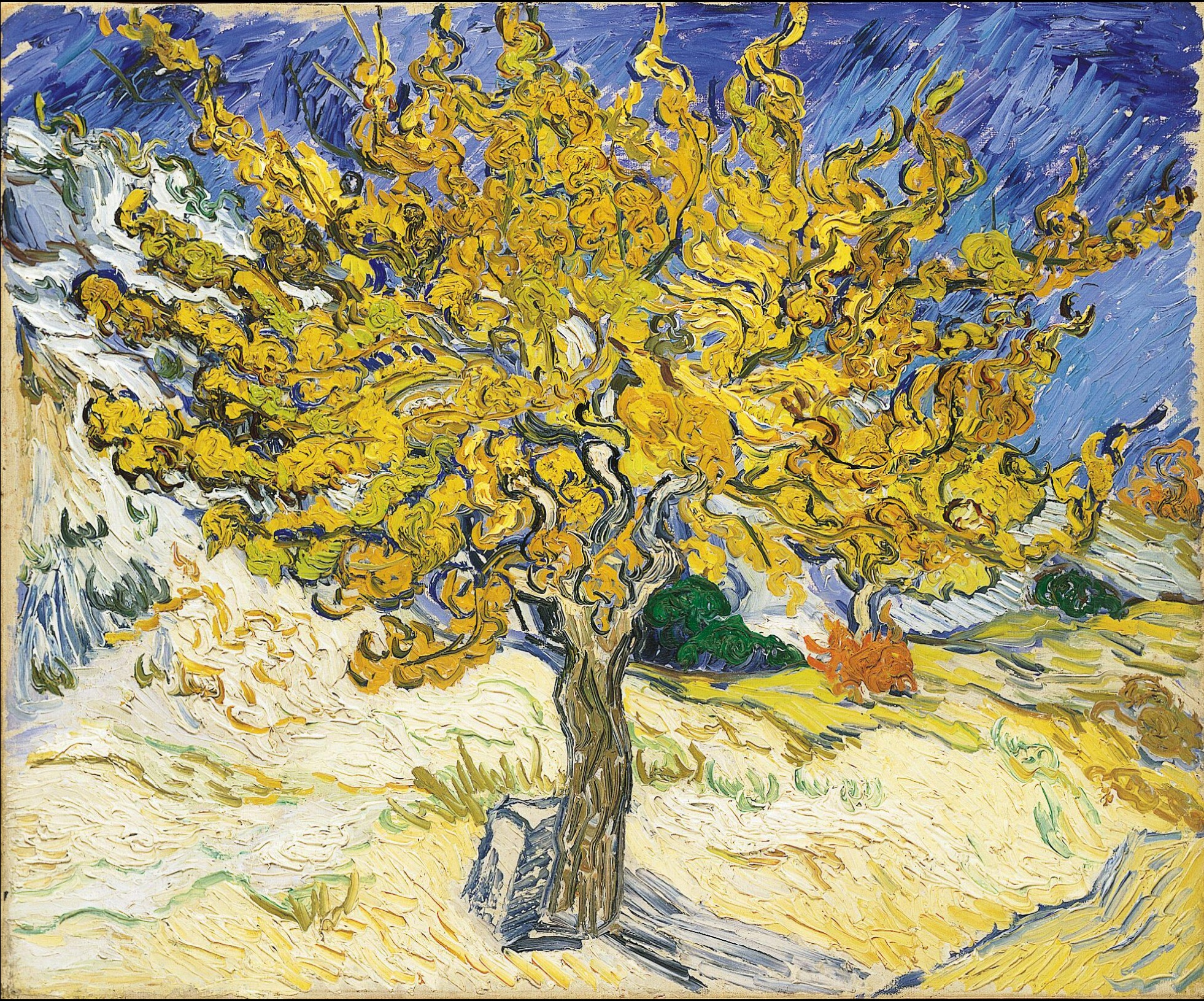
Vincent van Gogh, Mulberry Tree, 1889

Paul Gauguin Tahitian Woman and Boy, 1899

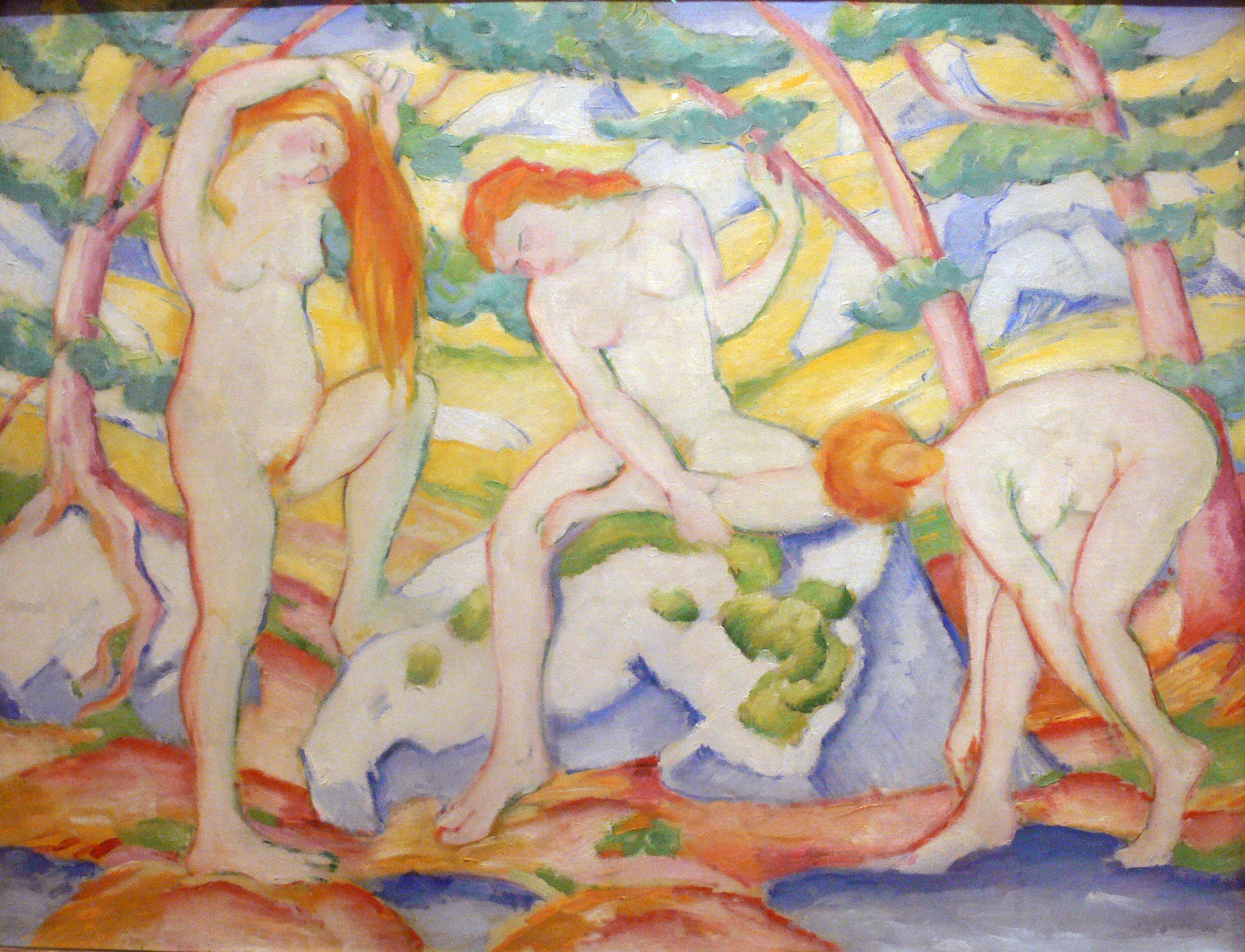
Franz Marc Bathing Girls, 1910

Ernst Ludwig Kirchner Bathers beneath Trees, 1913

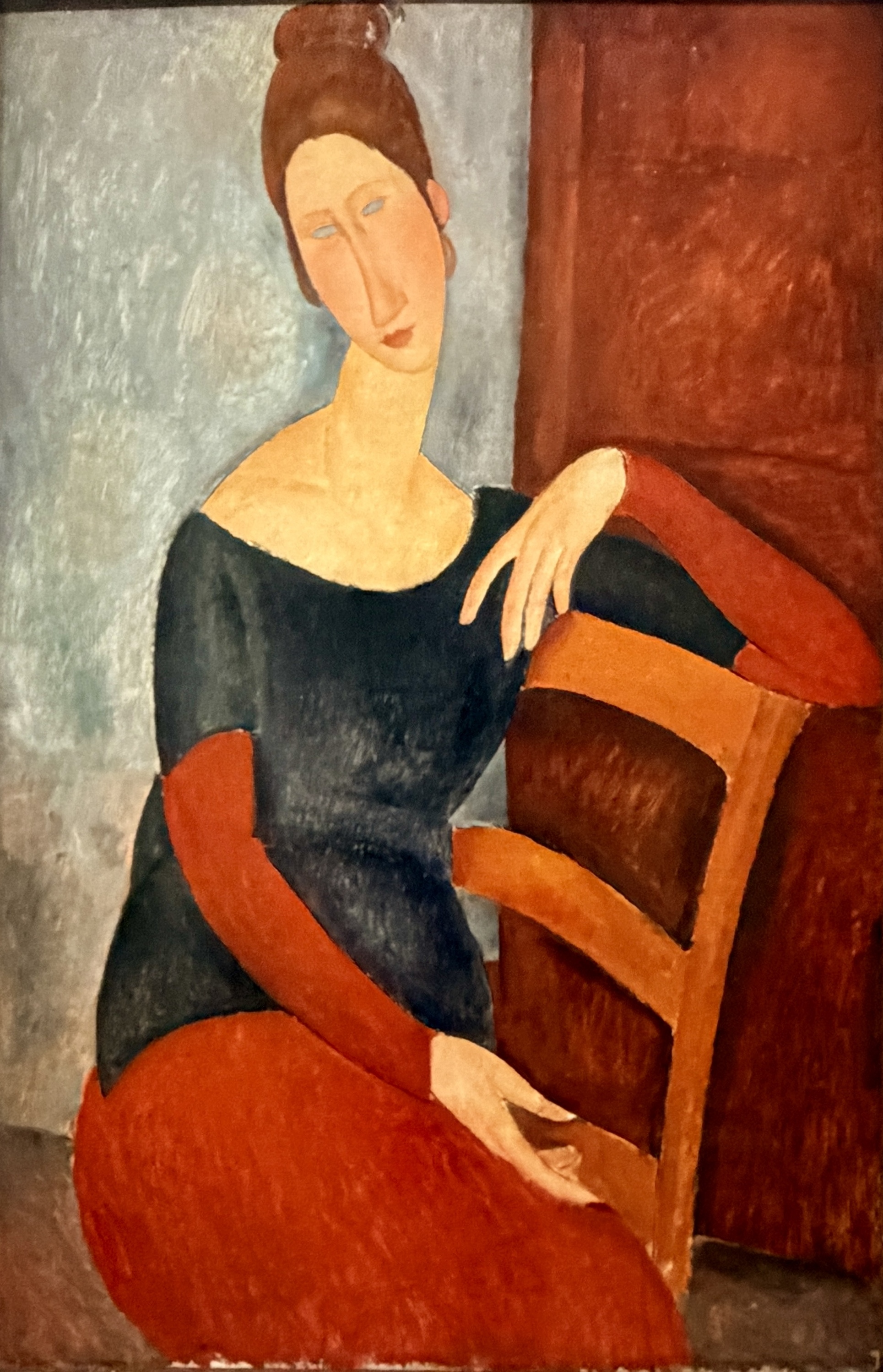
Amedeo Modigliani Juana Hébuterne , 1918

Wassily Kandinsky Open Green, 1923

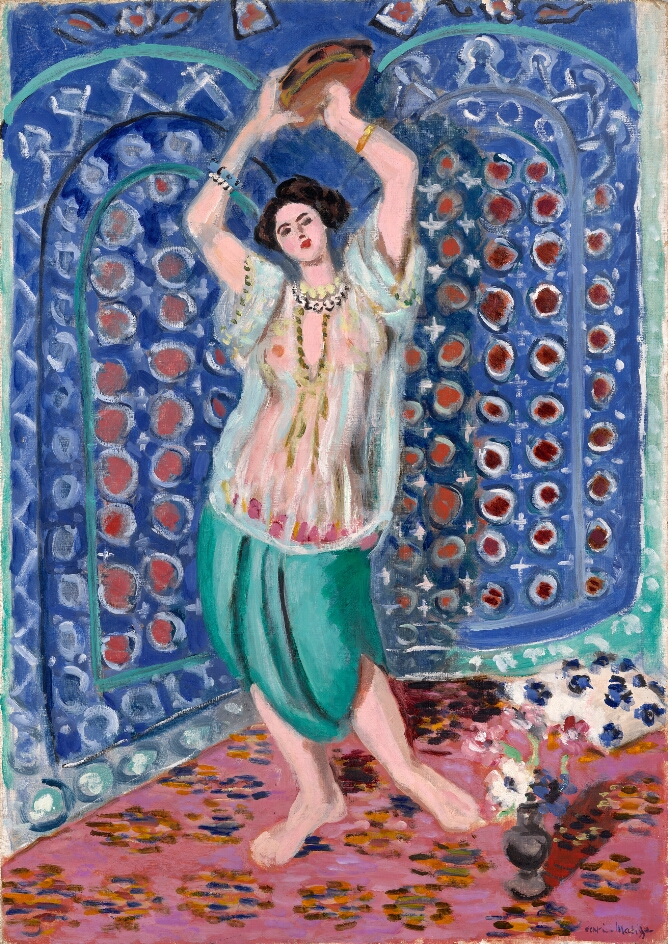
Henri Matisse Odalisque with Tambourine, 1926

Paul Klee Possibilities at Sea, 1932

== Looted art repatriation issues ==
=== Looted antiquities ===
In 2012, the Cambodian government asked the United States to help it recover a 10th-century Khmer sandstone statue from the Norton Simon Museum, saying the work was looted from a Cambodian temple complex during the country's political upheavals in the 1970s. The sculpture in question was owned by the Norton Simon Art Foundation and has been on display since 1980, and although Cambodian authorities have long known it was there, they had not sought its return until recently. In the spring of 2014, the Norton Simon returned the sculpture to the Kingdom of Cambodia.

=== The Cranach restitution claim ===
On May 1, 2007 Marei van Saher filed a lawsuit, seeking the return of Lucas Cranach the Elder's 1530 paired paintings Adam and Eve which had belonged to her father-in-law, Jacques Goudstikker, a prominent Dutch Jewish art dealer who died on board a ship with his family while attempting to flee the Netherlands. Lawsuits continue today.

==== Background ====
Goudstikker acquired the paintings at auction in 1931. After the war, the paintings were recovered by the Monuments Men who returned them, not to Goudstikker, but to the Dutch government. In 1966, in exchange for a payment and withdrawal of claims, the Dutch government transferred the paintings to United States Naval Commander George Stroganoff-Scherbatoff. Stroganoff-Scherbatoff claimed that the paintings had been seized by the Soviet government which auctioned them off. In 1970 and 1971 Stroganoff-Scherbatoff sold the paintings to the Norton Simon Foundation.

The Norton Simon museum fought the von Saher claim. Despite ethical concerns expressed by many, including the grandson of founder Norton Simon, the Norton Simon Museum continued its legal battle to keep the works. The Norton Simon Museum's defense hinges on a legal sale by the Dutch government to Commander Stroganoff-Scherbatoff after the owner's widow declined a settlement with the government in 1966. During the case in 2012, the court heard that "The Dutch government itself undermined the legitimacy of [the] restitution process by describing it as 'bureaucratic, cold and often even callous." The museum sought U.S. Supreme Court review of a June 2014 ruling delivered by the United States Court of Appeals for the Ninth Circuit that allowed von Saher to continue her claim; the Supreme Court had declined to hear a prior stage of the case in 2010. In 2017, the court ruled 3–0 against von Saher.

In 2026, after the new HEAR act passed by Congress banned the use of technical defenses in Holocaust-linked restitution cases, the Jewish Federation-Council of Greater Los Angeles, acting as von Saher's assignee, filed a new lawsuit against the museum. The Norton Simon Museum countersued the Jewish Federation in October 2026.
