= List of things named Venetian =

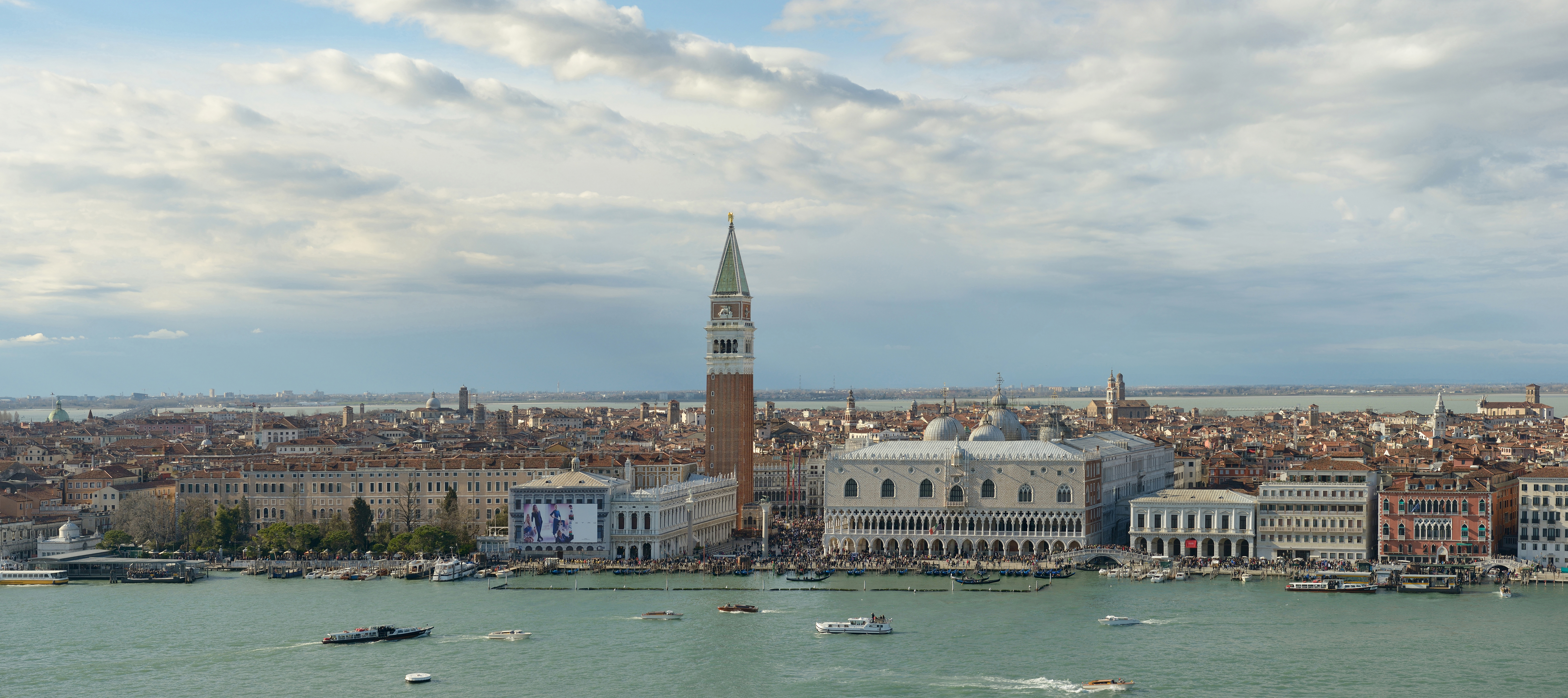
Venice, Italy

The list of things named Venetian is quite extensive.

Venetian generally describes anything from or related to the Italian city of Venice, or the Veneto region (of which Venice is the capital), or of the Republic of Venice (697–1797), a historical nation in that area. The term may also refer to the Venetian language, a Romance language spoken mostly in the Veneto region.

The term Venetian may also mean from or related to the American city of Venice, Florida, in Sarasota County.

There are many concept names that use the term "Venetian" in those general senses, such as Venetian cuisine, Venetian music, Venetian grammar, etc. There are, however, many concepts where "Venetian" has a special sense that cannot be deduced from the general ones. There are also many people, buildings, and works of art with "Venetian" in their name.

== Special senses ==
=== History ===
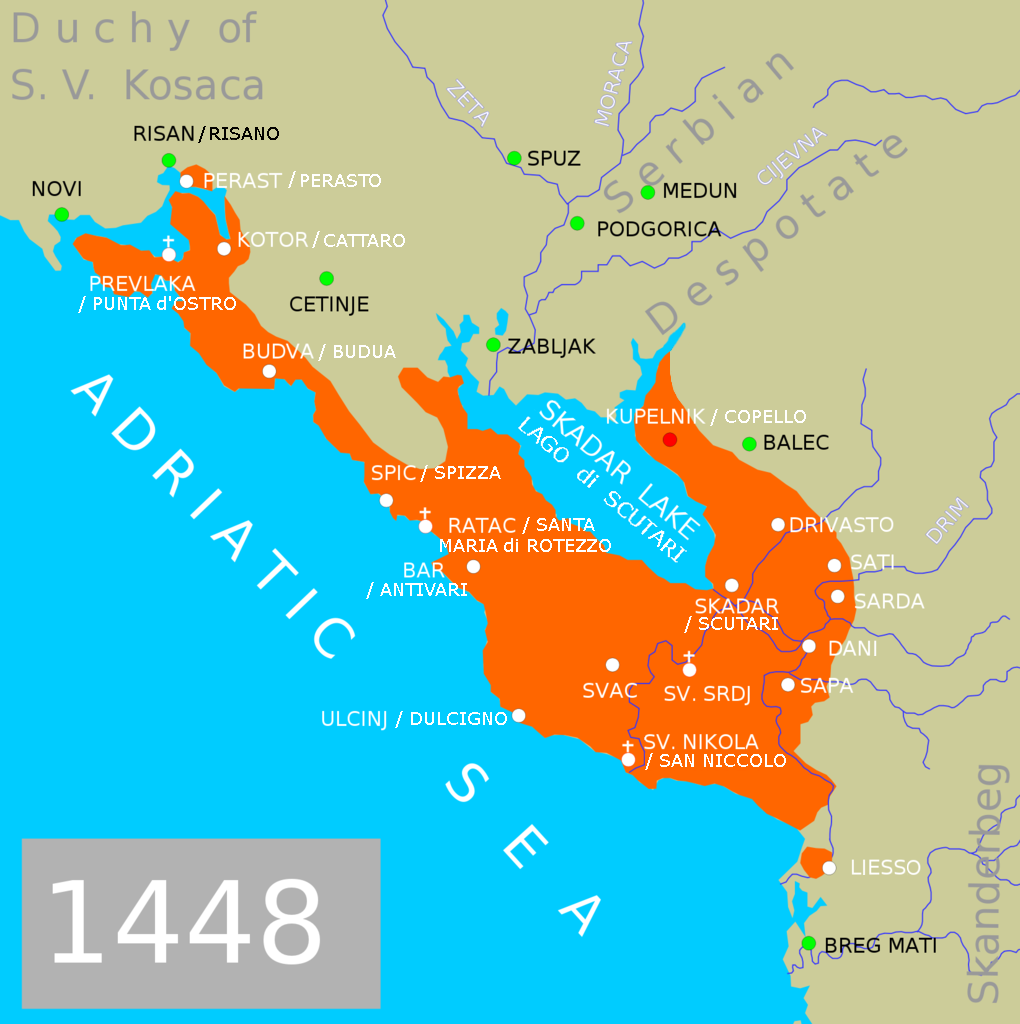
Venetian Albania

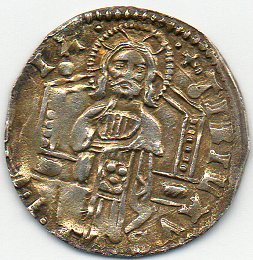
Venetian grosso

- Venetian Albania (1392–1797), dominion of the Republic of Venice in present south Montenegro and north Albania
- Venetian Crete, the Kingdom of Candia (1212–1669), a colony of the Republic of Venice
- Venetian Crusade (1122–1124) by the Republic of Venice to the Holy Land
- Venetian Dalmatia (1400–1797), dominion of the Republic of Venice in present Croatia
- Venetian ducat, a gold ducat coin issued by the Republic of Venice from 1284 to 1797
- Venetian grosso, a silver coin minted by the Republic of Venice in 1193
- Venetian Interdict, a Papal decree placing sanctions on the Republic of Venice in 1605–1607
- Venetian lira, a currency of the Republic of Venice issued from 953 to 1807
- Venetian rule in the Ionian Islands (1361–1797), by the Republic of Venice
- Venetian Province, a historical province (1797–1815), the former territory of the Republic of Venice
- Venetian rule or Venetocracy (Βενετοκρατία, Venetokratia), the period of Venetian rule in Greece (1212–1669); see Frankokratia

=== Geography ===
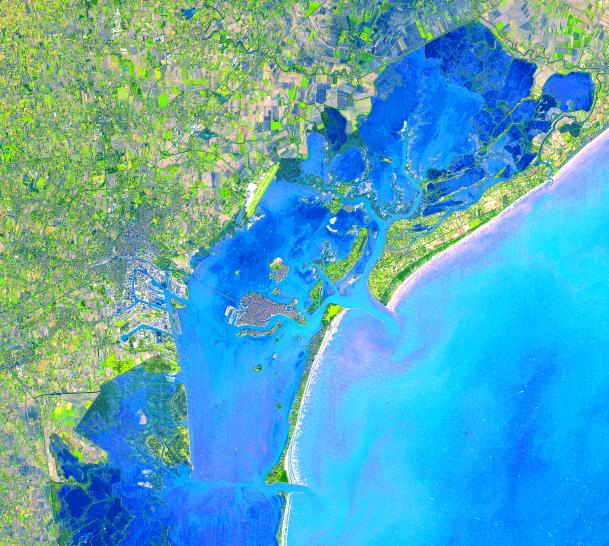
Venetian Lagoon

- Venetian Ghetto, the Venice borough where Jews were segregated in 1516; origin of word "ghetto"
- Venetian Hills, a neighborhood in southwest Atlanta (GA), USA.
- Venetian islands, in the Venetian Lagoon south of Venice
- Venetian Islands, Florida (USA), artificial islands between Miami and Miami Beach
- Venetian Isles, New Orleans (Îles Vénetiennes), a neighborhood of the city in Louisiana, USA
- Venetian Lagoon, the shallow bay on the south side of Venice
- Venetian Plain, the flatlands in the Veneto and Friuli regions of Italy
- Venetian Slavia or Slavia Friulana, a Slovenian-speaking enclave in the Friuli region of Italy
- Venetian Village, Illinois, a census division in Lake County (IL), USA; about 2900 hab in 2010

=== Styles of arts and crafts ===
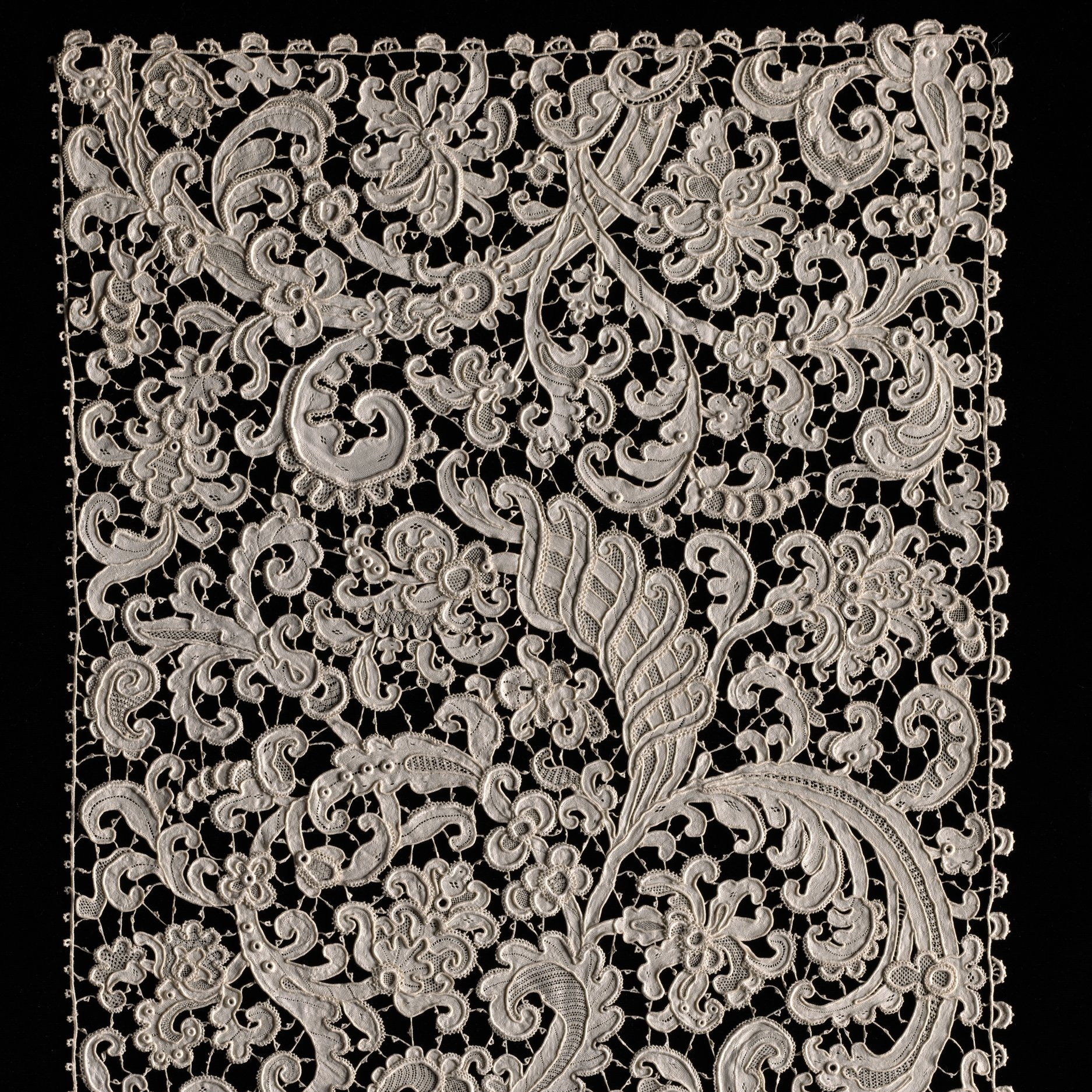
Venetian point

- Venetian glass, artistic glass objects from the island of Murano in Venice's bay
- Venetian Gothic architecture, a building style developed in Venice in the 1300s
- Venetian needle lace, also Venetian point or point de Venise, a type of lace with floral motifs, popular in the 1600s
- Venetian painting, a major tradition in Italian Renaissance painting
- Venetian polychoral style, a style of choral music from the Baroque and Renaissance
- Venetian Renaissance, a period in Venetian history that covered the 15th and 16th centuries
- Venetian Renaissance architecture, a style of buildings originated in Venice around 1480
- Venetian school (art), a style of painting starting in the 1400s
- Venetian School (music), style and composers in Venice from 1550 to 1610

=== Objects and products ===
==== Architecture and furniture ====
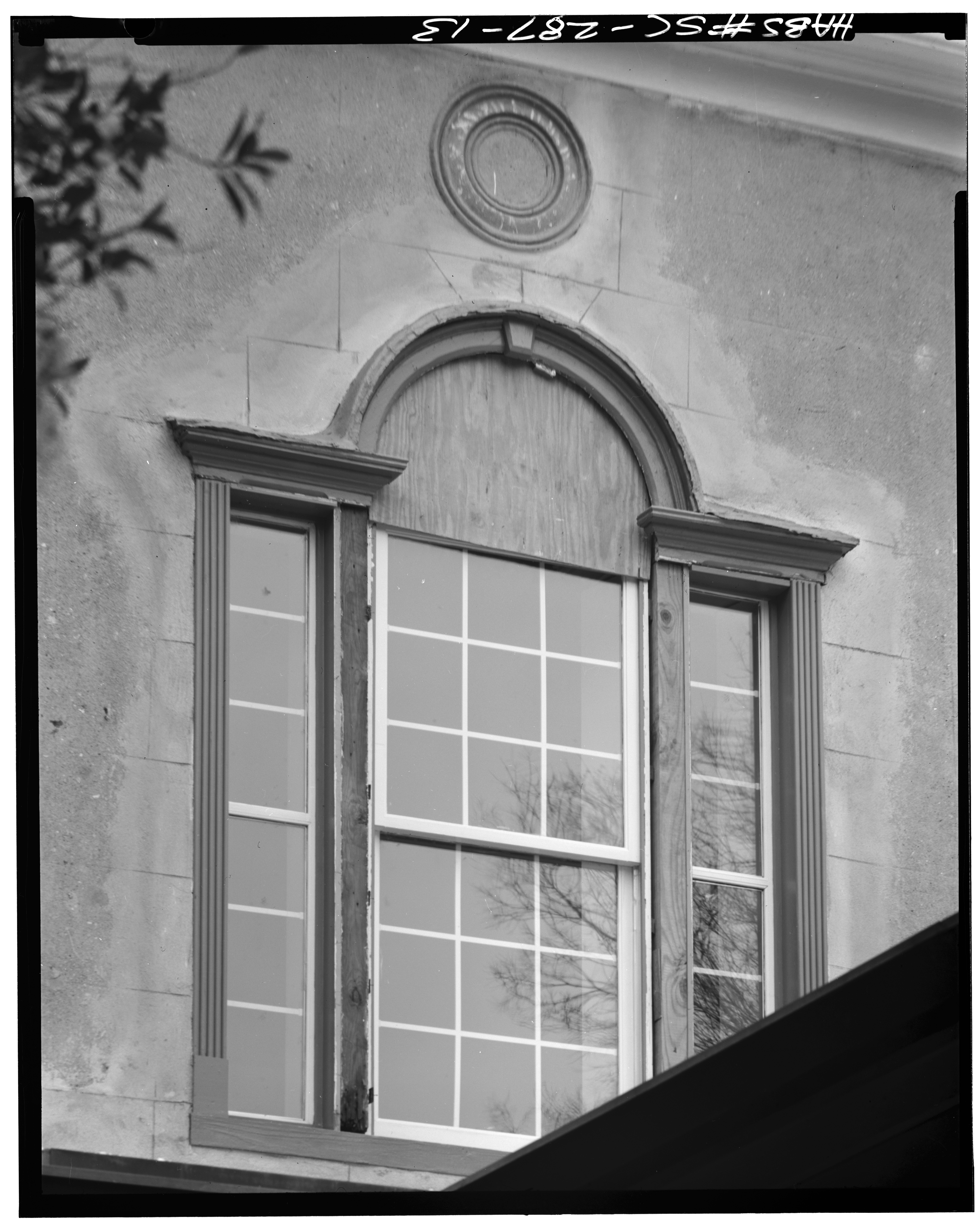
Venetian window

- Venetian arch, a usually pointed arch with a band wider at the peak than at the spring
- Venetian blind, or Venetian, a common type of window blind similar to Persian blind
- Venetian curtain, a type of theater front curtain
- Venetian dentil, an architectural ornament; a type of dentil
- Venetian door, a door with narrow sidelights, like a Venetian window
- Venetian carpet, a type of inexpensive carpet
- Venetian window, a type of window with arched top flanked by two narrow sidelights

==== Utensils, materials, plants ====
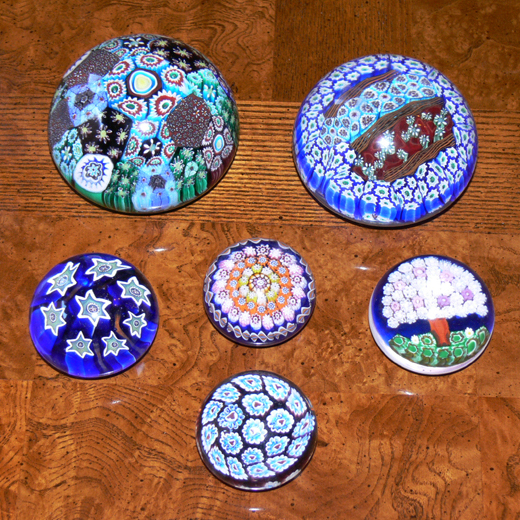
Venetian balls

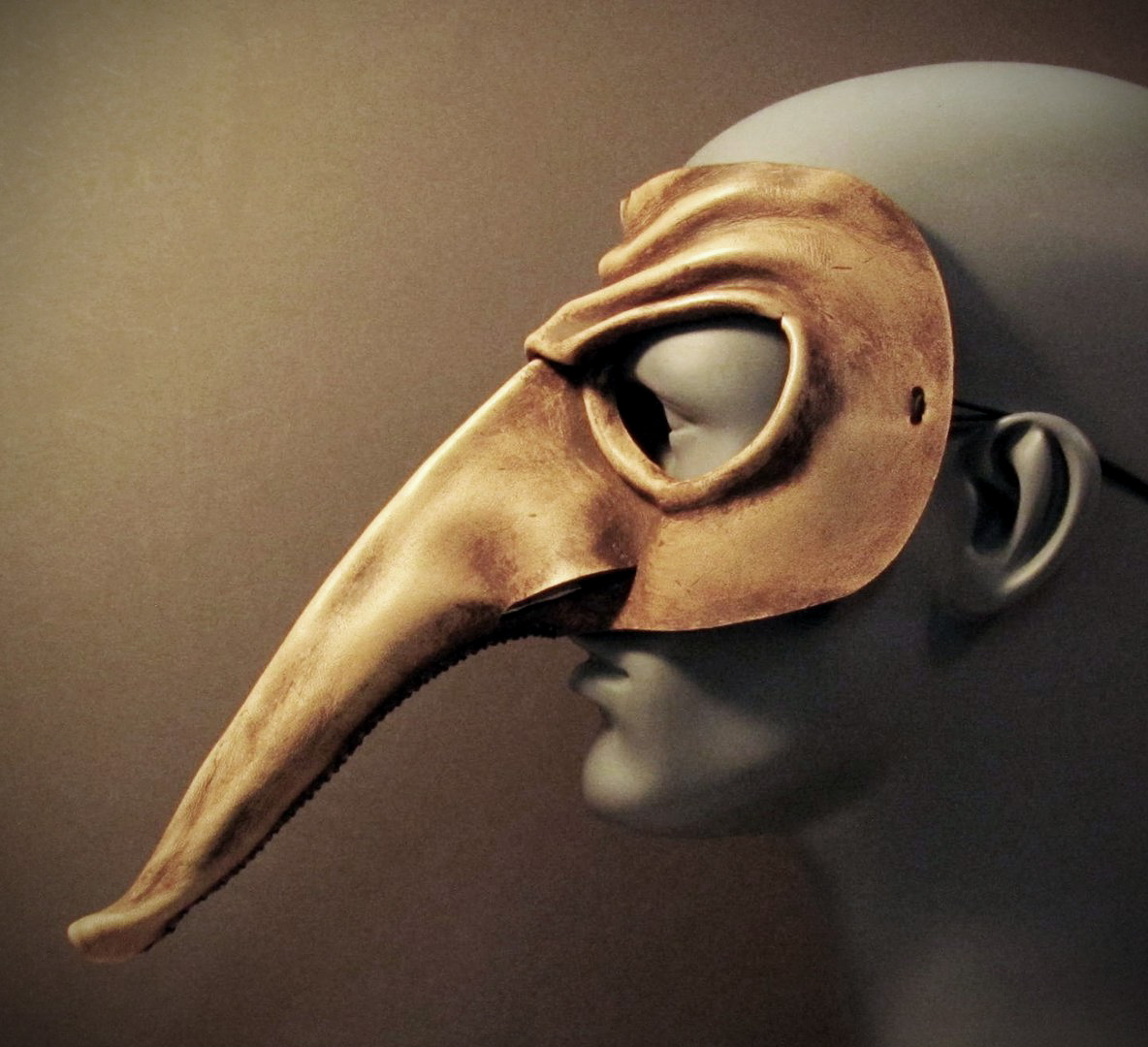
Venetian mask

- Venetian ball, a ball of glass with enclosed objects, often used as paperweight
- Venetian blind shades or shutter shades, sunglasses with horizontal slats instead of lenses
- Venetian chalk, a white compact talc or steatite used especially for marking on cloth
- Venetian mask, a special variety traditionally worn in the Carnival of Venice
- Venetian plaster, a type of polished plaster including marble dust
- Venetian pearl, an imitation pearl made of solid glass
- Venetian-style shoe, or Venetian loafer, a plain mid-heel slipper
- Venetian soap, made with olive oil
- Venetian sumac or smoke tree (Cotinus abovatus)
- Venetian swell, a swell organ with blinds patterned closing the swell box

==== Colors, pigments, and varnishes ====
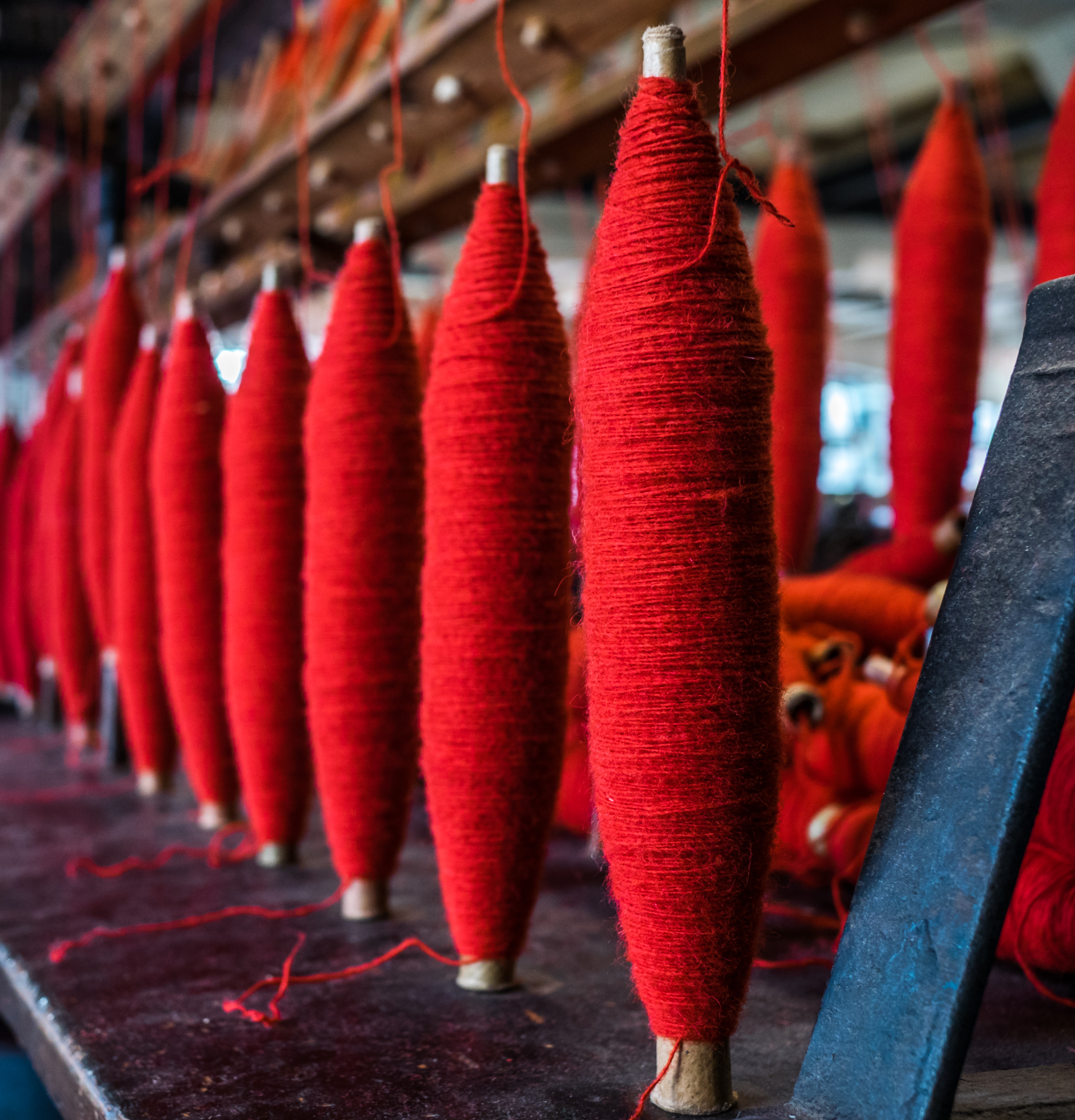
Venetian red

- Venetian blue, same as cobalt blue
- Venetian ceruse, a lead-based white cosmetic face paint used in the 1600s and 1700s
- Venetian green, a bluish dark green color
- Venetian lake, a red painter's pigment or shade or carmine (color)
- Venetian red, a painter's pigment
- Venetian rose, a shade of pink
- Venetian scarlet, a shade of red
- Venetian turpentine or Venice turpentine, an artists' varnish from larch (Larix decidua) resin
- Venetian white, a painter's pigment, mix of lead white and barium sulfate
- Venetian yellow or amber yellow, a shade of yellow

=== Other ===
- Venetian Carnival, or the Carnival of Venice, a traditional festivity since the 12th century
- Venetian Festival, any modern costume festivity inspired on the historic carnival of Venice

- Hythe Venetian Fete, a traditional carnival of Kent, England

- Venetian Mafia, called Mala del Brenta, a criminal organization in Veneto
- The Venetians a 2013 sculptural work by Pawel Althamer

== In titles and names ==
=== Buildings and structures ===
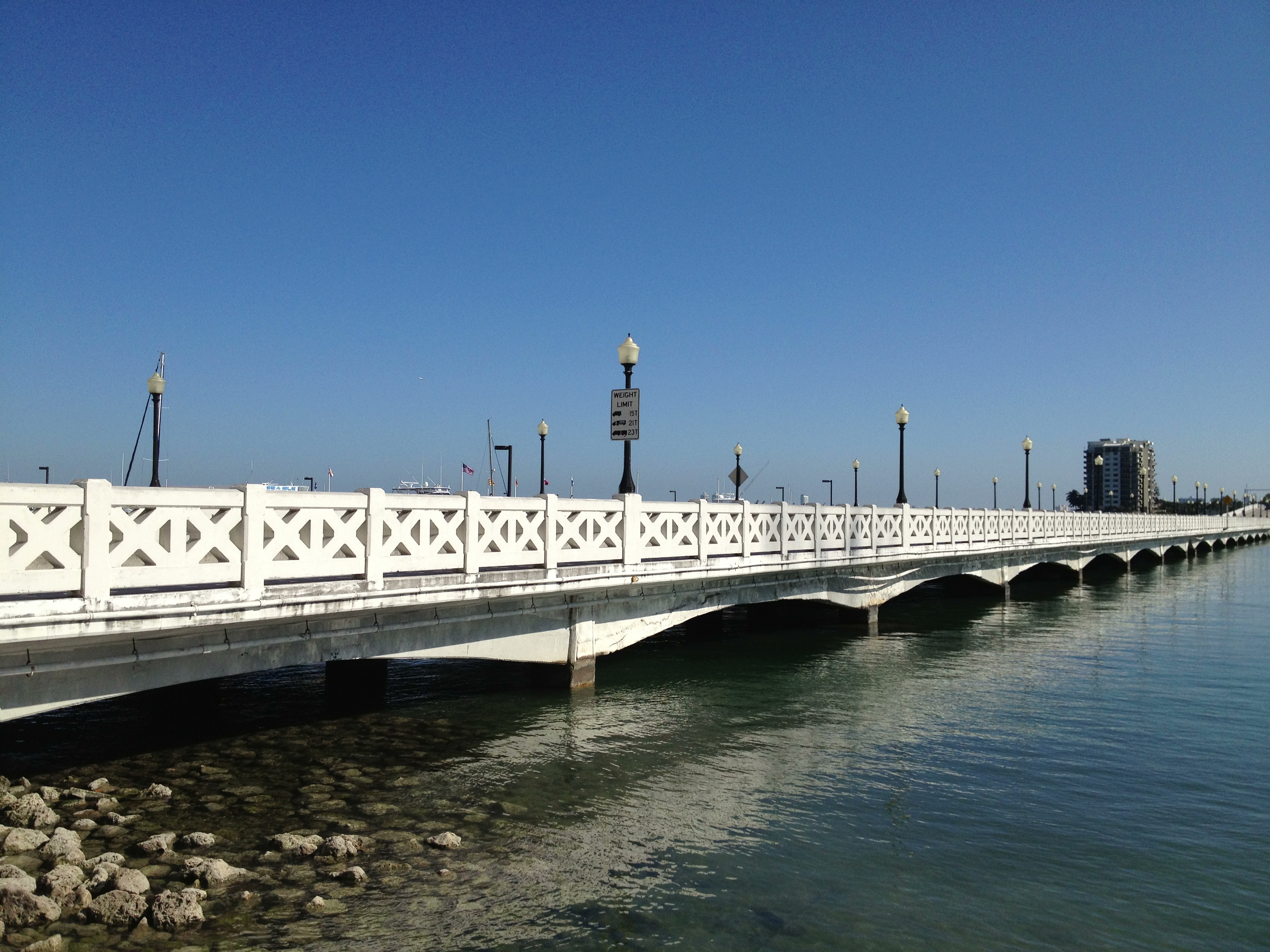
Venetian Causeway

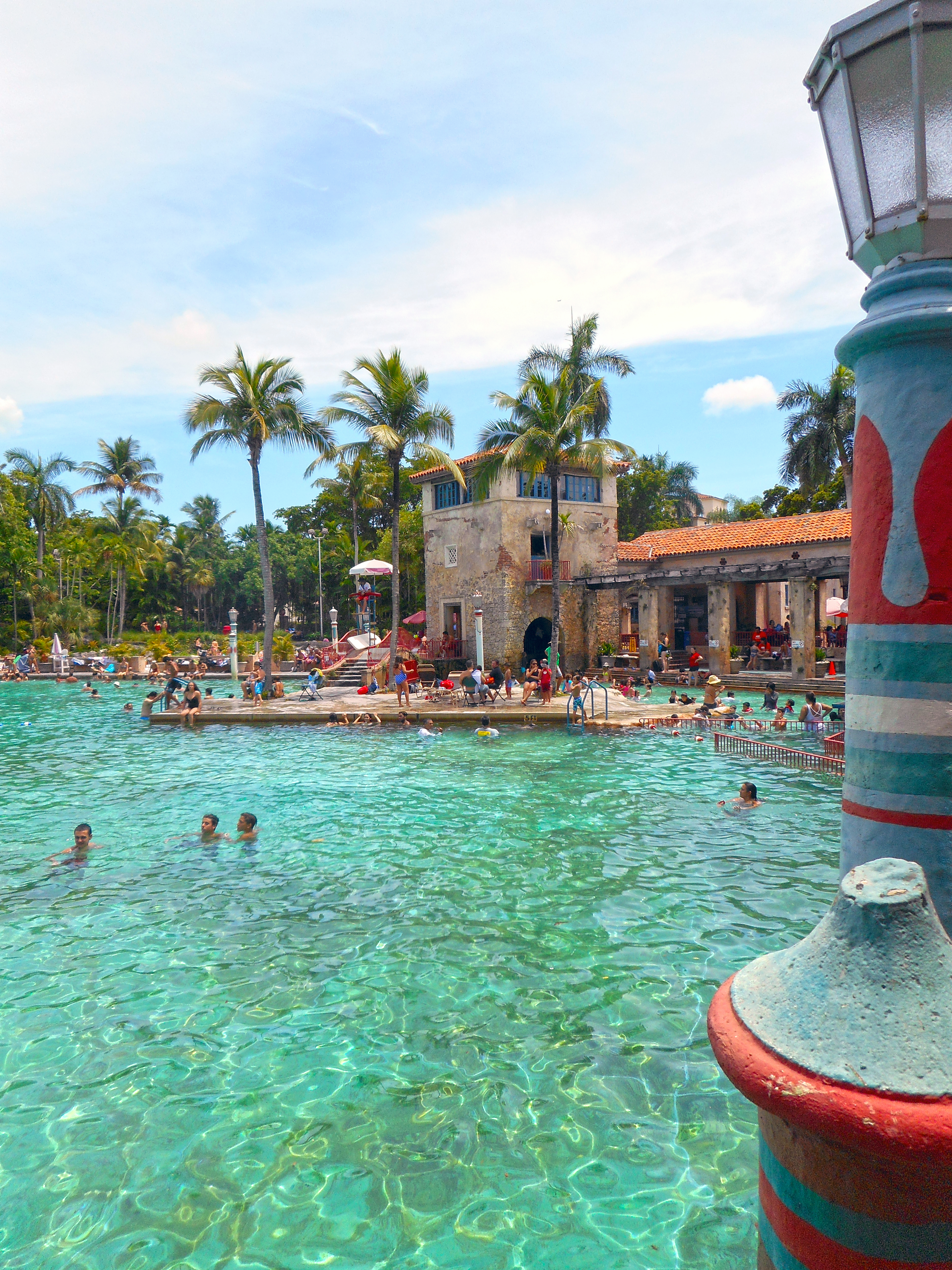
Venetian Pool

- Venetian Arena, former name (2008–2010) of the Cotai Arena in Macao, China.
- Venetian arsenal, Gouvia, built by the Republic of Venice in Corfu (Greece) 1400s or 1500s
- Venetian Bay Resort, a development and resort in Kissimmee (FL), USA
- Venetian Causeway, a bridge connecting Miami Beach to mainland Miami (FL), USA
- Venetian Court, a seaside resort in Capitola (CA), USA
- Venetian Garden, Leesburg, a park in Lake County (FL), USA
- Venetian Golf and River Club, in North Venice (FL), USA
- Venetian House (Sighișoara), a building from the 1500s in Sighișoara, Romania
- The Venetian Las Vegas, a resort hotel and casino in Las Vegas, Nevada
- The Venetian Macao, a hotel and casino in Macau, China
- Venetian Pool, a historic public swimming pool built in 1924 in Coral Gables (FL), USA
- Disney's Venetian Resort, a project of the late 1960s for Disney World (FL, USA) that was never built.
- Venetian Theatre, a former theater in Hillsboro, Oregon, USA
- The Venetian Theater, a building in the Caramoor Center for Music and the Arts, near Katonah, New York USA
- Venetian Waterway Park, a 9.3 mile scenic bike path built ca. 2002 in Sarasota County, near Venice (FL), USA

=== Books and plays ===
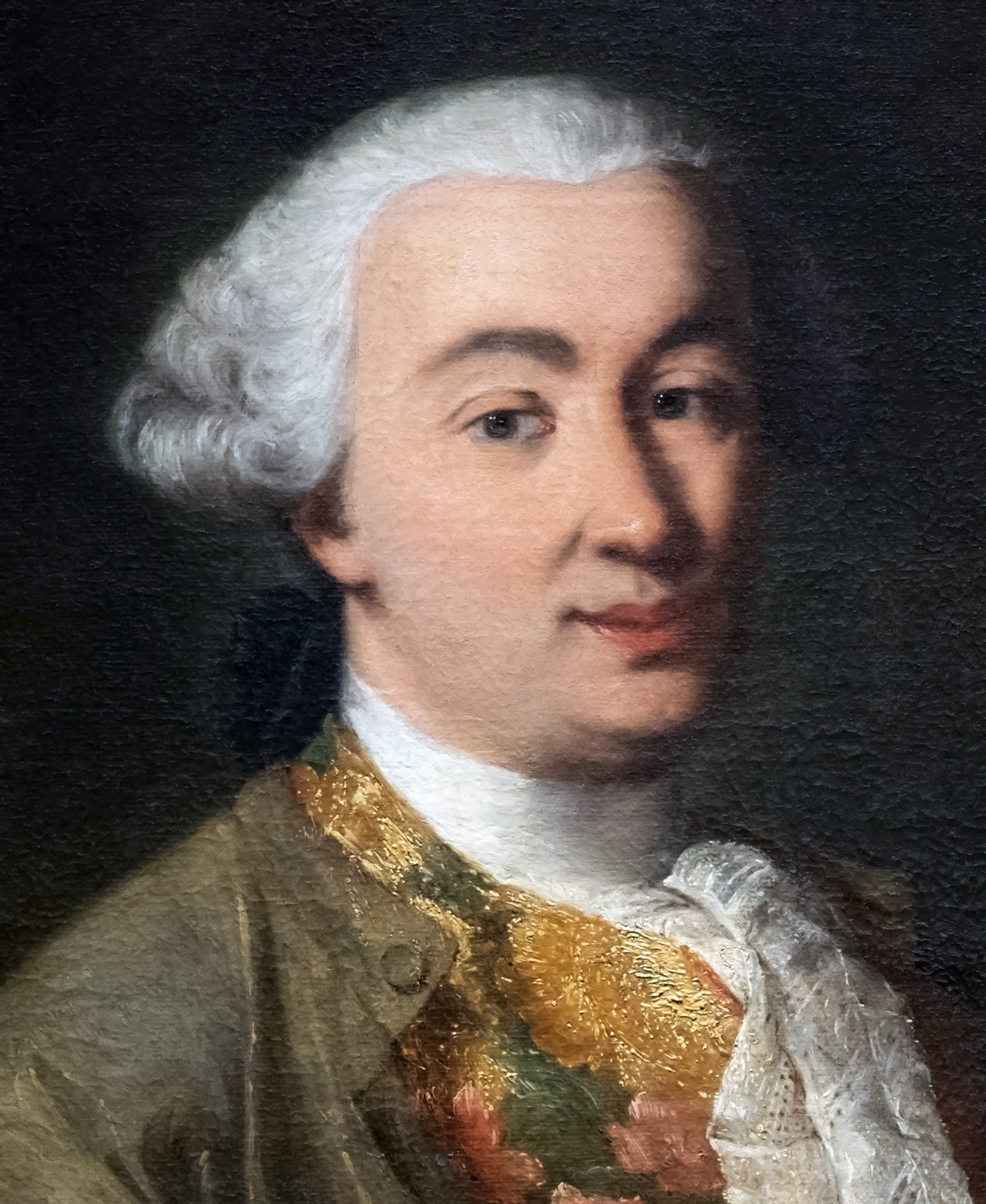
Carlo Goldoni

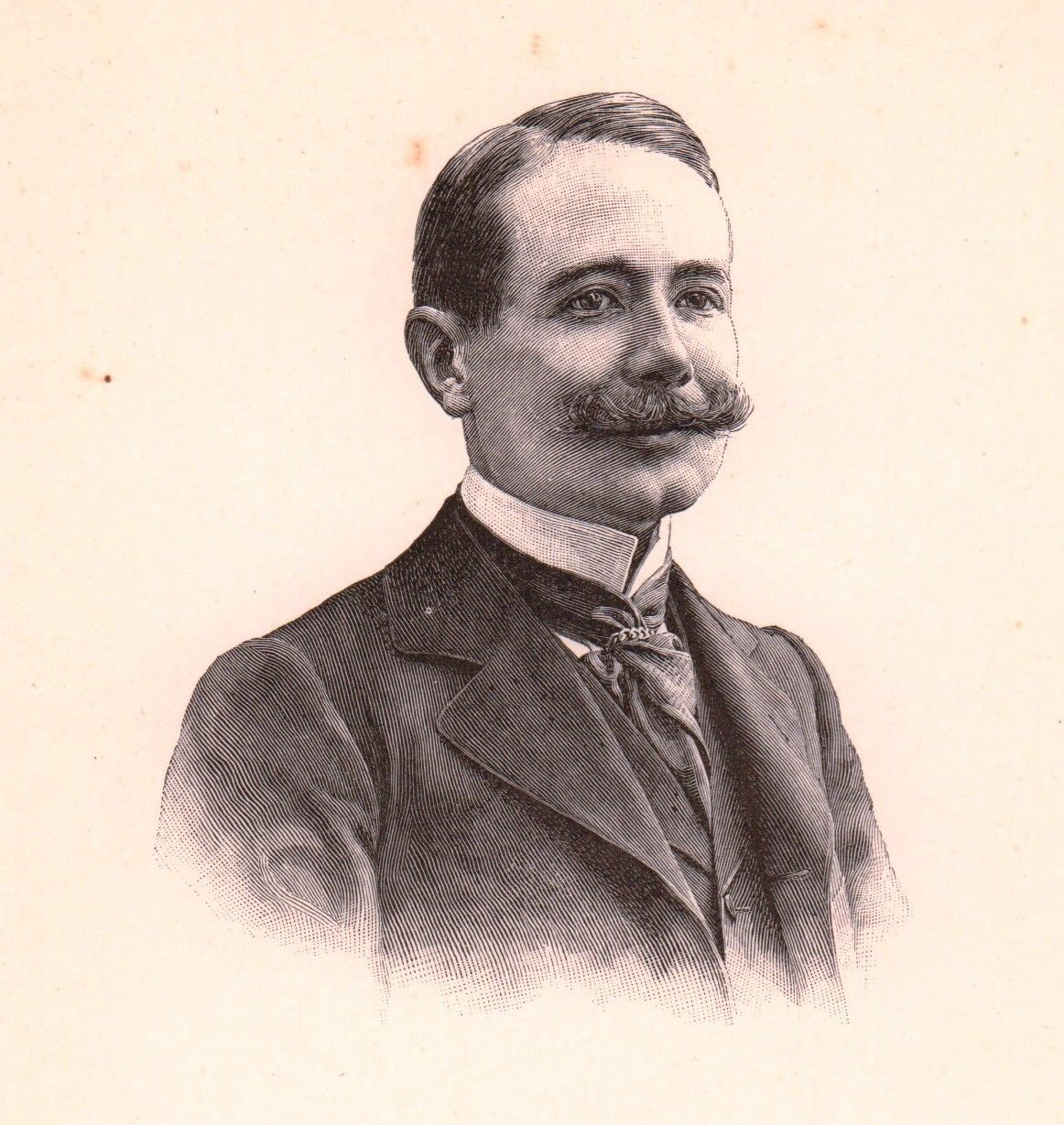
Abel Hermant

- The Anonymous Venetian (novel), a book by Donna Leon
- The Venetian, or The Venetian Woman, or The Venetian Comedy, originally La veniexiana (play), comedy play in Venetian language, 1535–1537
- The Venetian Affair (novel), 1963 novel by Scottish-American author Helen MacInnes
- The Voyages of the Venetian Brothers Nicolò and Antonio Zeno to the Northern Seas in the XIVth Century, account of the travels of the Zeno brothers, edited by R. H. Major, 1873
- Venetian Masque, a 1935 English adventure novel by Rafael Sabatini
- The Venetian Nights (Les noces vénitiennes), a 1924 novel by Abel Hermant published by Ferenczi
- The Venetian Twins (I due gemelli veneziani), a 1747 theater play by Goldoni
- The Venetian Twins (musical), a 1979 Australian musical comedy play by Enright and Clarke
- The Venetians, 1892 novel by Mary Elizabeth Braddon

=== Movies ===
- The Anonymous Venetian (film) (Anonimo veneziano), a 1970 Italian drama by Enrico Maria Salerno
- A Holy Venetian Family (Leoni), a 2015 Italian comedy movie by Pietro Parolin
- The Venetian (film) (Venetianskan), a 1958 TV movie directed by Ingmar Bergman
- The Venetian Affair (film), 1967 American movie
- Venetian Bird, a 1952 British thriller movie directed by Ralph Thomas
- Venetian Honeymoon (La prima notte, Les noces vénitiennes), 1959 Italian-French comedy movie by Cavalcanti
- Venetian Lovers, 1925 British silent film by Niebuhr and Tilley
- Venetian Nights (Nuits de Venise), a 1931 German operetta movie by Billon and Wiene
- The Venetian Woman (La venexiana), 1986 Italian erotic film by Mauro Bolognini

=== Paintings ===
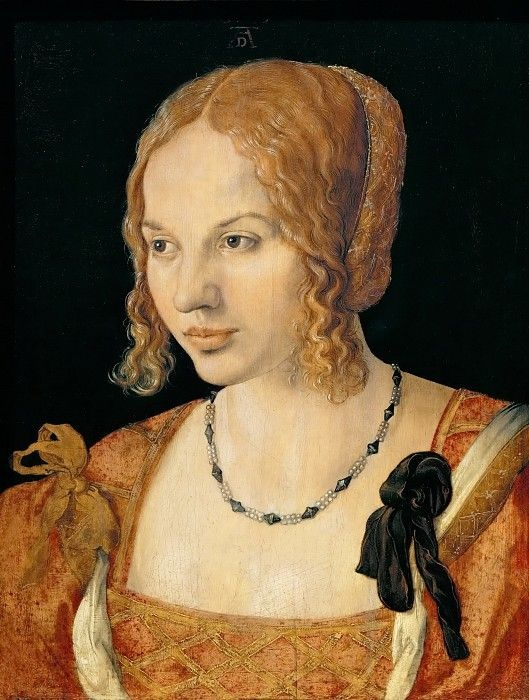
Dürer: Portrait of a Venetian Woman

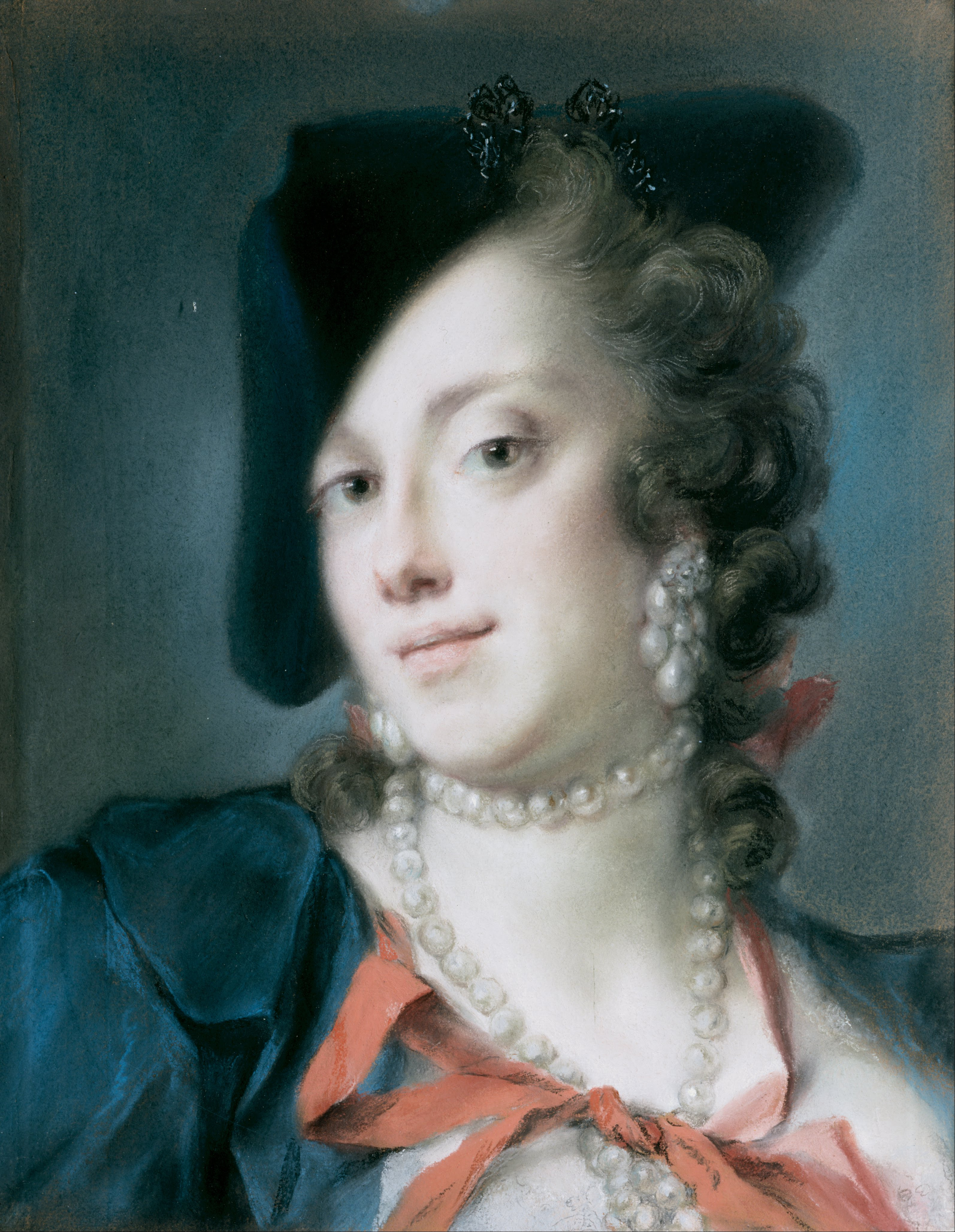
Carriera: A Venetian Lady from the House of Barbarigo

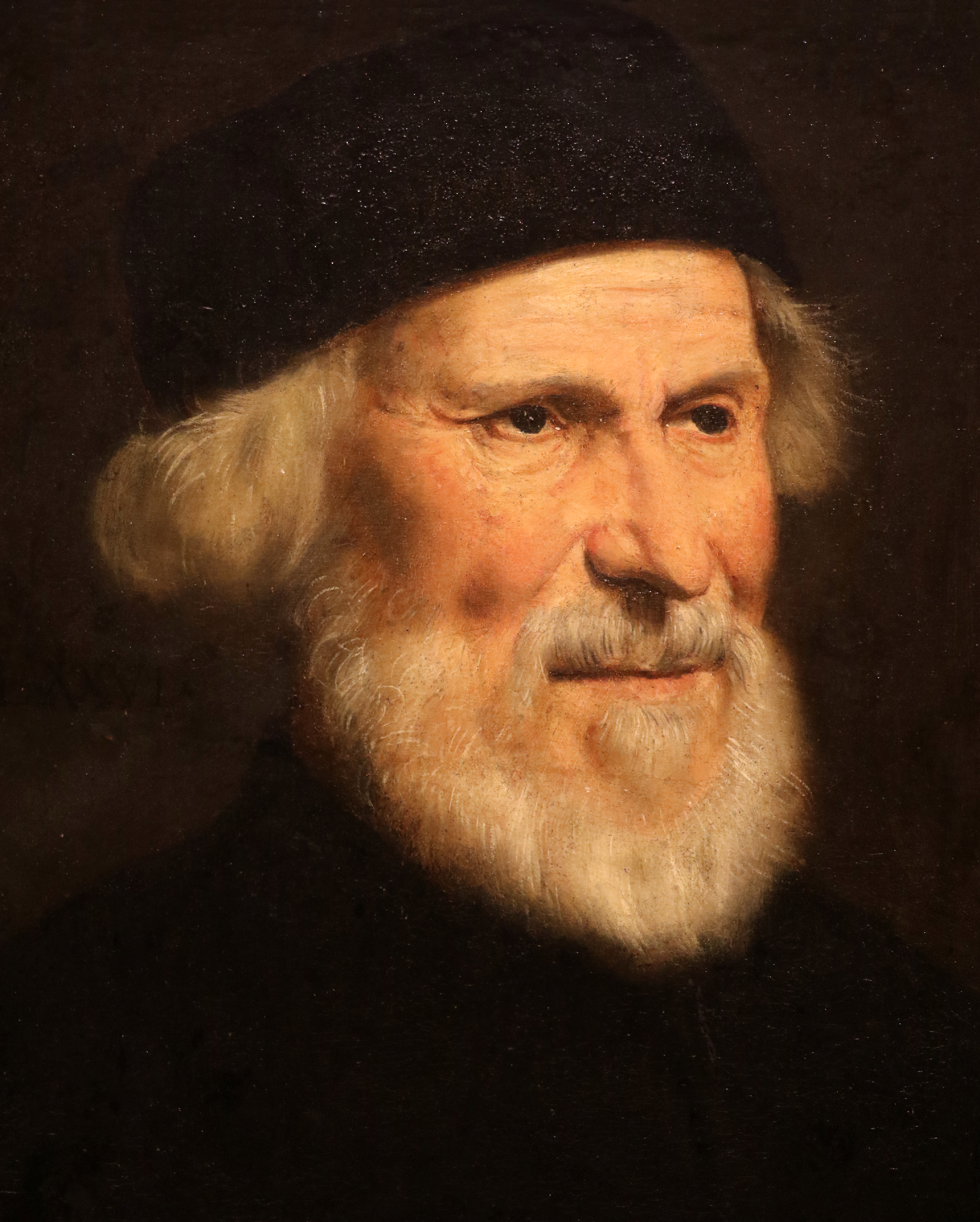
Tintoretto: Portrait of a Venetian

- Portrait of a Venetian by Tintoretto, ca. 1550
- Portrait of a Venetian Admiral by Tintoretto, 1570s
- Self-Portrait as Venetian Ambassador, by Bernardo Bellotto, 1765
- Pavel Sorokoumskiy as Venetian Doge, unknown painter, late 1800s
- The Venetian Girl by Frank Duvenek, ca. 1880
- Head of a Venetian Girl by Giorgione, 1509
- A Venetian Lady from the House of Barbarigo by Rosalba Carriera, 1735–1740
- Portrait of a Venetian Man by Jan van Scorel, ca. 1520
- Portrait of a Venetian Nobleman by Peter Paul Rubens, 1620s
- Venetian Nobleman by Tintoretto, 1590s
- Portrait of the Venetian Painter Giovanni Bellini by Tizian, 1511–1512
- Portrait of a Venetian Senator, by Tintoretto, ca. 1570
- The Venetian Shoe Black (Lustrascarpe veneziano), tinted photo by Carlo Ponti, 1867
- Portrait of a Venetian Woman, by Paolo Veronese, late 1500s
- Portrait of a Venetian Woman, or Madonna delle rose, by Tintoretto, 1597–1600
- Portrait of a Venetian Woman, a 1505 painting by Albrecht Dürer
- Portrait of a Venetian Woman, or La Belle Nani, by Paolo Veronese

=== People and spirits ===
- The Reliable Venetian Hand, an anonymous art collector from the 1700s
- VenetianPrincess, pseudonym of Jodie-Amy Rivera (1984–), American internet video personality
- Venetian Snares, stage name of Aaron Funk (1975–), Canadian electronic musician
- The Venetians (Australian band), a mid-1980s pop music band

=== Political parties and movements ===
- Venetian nationalism, a political movement
- Party of the Venetians (Partito dei Veneti, PdV), an ephemeral party (Jan–Sep 2010)
- Venetian Agreement (Intesa Veneta), a party (2006–)
- Venetian League or Liga Veneta, Łiga Vèneta, a party (1979–)
- Venetian Left (2013) (Sanca Veneta, SV), a party (2013–)
- Venetian National Liberation Movement (Movimento di Liberazione Nazionale del Popolo Veneto, MNLV), an independence movement (2009–)
- Venetian National Party (Partito Nasional Veneto, PNV), a former party (2007–2011)
- Venetian People's Unity (Unitá Popolare Veneta, UPV), a party (2008–)
- Venetian People's Movement (Movimento Popolare Veneto, MPV), a former party (2008–2015?)
- Union of the Venetian People (Unione del Popolo Veneziano, UPV), a former party (1995–1999)

=== Other ===
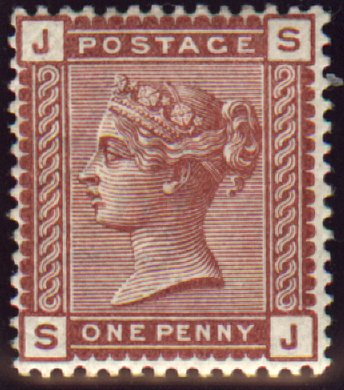
Penny Venetian Red

- Venetian Arts Society, a not-for-profit organization in Fort Lauderdale (FL), USA
- Penny Venetian Red, a British postage stamp issued in 1880–1881
- Venetian Way (1957–1964), a racehorse, winner of the 1960 Kentucky derby
- Venetian, a popular Australian biscuit produced by Arnott's

== See also ==
- Friulan and Giulian, related to or from Friuli-Venezia Giulia, a region of Italy
- Venice (disambiguation)
- Veneti (disambiguation)
- Venetia (disambiguation)
