= Venice (disambiguation) =

Venice is a city in Italy. In historical contexts, the name may refer to the Republic of Venice.

Venice or Venise may also refer to:

== Music ==
- Music of Venice, the city's role in the development of the music of Italy
- Venice (Fennesz album), 2004
- Venice (Anderson Paak album), 2014
- Venice (band), a band from Venice, California
- Venice (musical), first produced in 2010 in Kansas City, Missouri, U.S.

== Places ==
=== United States ===
- Venice, Bainbridge Island, Washington, a community of Bainbridge Island
- Venice, Florida, a city in Sarasota County
- Venice, Illinois, a city in Madison County
- Venice, Los Angeles, a neighborhood on the Westside of the city, California
- Venice, Louisiana, an unincorporated community and census-designated place in Plaquemines Parish
- Venice, Missouri, an unincorporated community
- Venice, Nebraska, a census-designated place in Douglas County
- Venice, New York, a town in Cayuga County
- Venice, Ohio, former name of Ross, a census-designated place in Butler County
- Venice, Utah, an unincorporated community in Sevier County

=== Other places ===
- Venice, Alberta, Canada, a hamlet in Lac La Biche County
- Venise, Doubs, a commune of the Doubs département, in France
- Klein-Venedig (Little Venice), Venezuela, a 16th-century German colony
- Venice, Zimbabwe, a village in the province of Mashonaland West

=== Place nicknames ===
- "Brazilian Venice", nickname for Recife, Brazil
- The Green Venice or Marais Poitevin, a large area of marshland in western France
- "Venice of America", nickname for Fort Lauderdale, Florida, U.S.
- Venice of Cieszyn, part of the Old Town of Cieszyn, Poland
- Venice of Portugal, nickname for Aveiro, Portugal
- Venice of the East, a list of places with this nickname
- Venice of the North, a list of places with this nickname
- Venice of the Orient, nickname for Shanghai, China
- "Venice of the Pacific", nickname for the ruins of Nan Madol at Pohnpei

== Other uses ==
- Venice Kamel Gouda (born 1934), Egyptian research professor and a former Minister of State for Scientific Research
- Venice (film), a 2014 Cuban drama film
- Venice (video game), a 2007 action puzzle game
- Venice, the production code for a type of AMD64 CPU
- Venice/Venice, a 1992 American drama film
- Venice 24/7, a 2012 British documentary TV series
- Venice, from the Porch of Madonna della Salute, an 1835 painting by J. M. W. Turner
- Venice: The Series, a soap opera web series
- Sony VENICE, a Sony E-mount camera
- Venices (book), a 1971 book by Paul Morand

== See also ==
- Venice in media, a list of references to Venice, Italy, in various media
- Venice Beach Boardwalk
- Venecia (disambiguation)
- Venetia (disambiguation)
- Venetian (disambiguation)
- Venezia (disambiguation)
- Little Venice (disambiguation)
- Venice Township (disambiguation)
