= Venecia =

Venecia is the Spanish name for Venice. It may also refer to:

- Venecia, Antioquia, town and municipality in Colombia
- Venecia, Bogotá, neighborhood of Bogotá, Colombia
- Venecia, Cundinamarca, town and municipality in Colombia
- Venecia (TransMilenio), a station in Bogotá, Colombia
- Venecia, the original title of the 2014 Cuban film Venice

== See also ==
- De Venecia, a surname
- Venice (disambiguation)
