= Gaviotas =

Ecovillage in Vichada, Colombia

Coordinates: 4°33′N 70°55′W

Vichada department

Centro Las Gaviotas is an ecovillage and vereda located in the Llanos region of Colombia, in the department of Vichada. It was founded in 1971 by Paolo Lugari, who assembled a group of engineers and scientists in an attempt to create alternative and sustainable modes of living that were specifically adapted to the tropics in developing nations. Gaviotas has developed many internationally recognized technologies such as windmills and water pumps specifically designed to be low cost and adapted to tropical environments, it has also planted around 10,000 hectares of forest that have allowed hundreds of native plant and animal species to thrive in a harsh environment from where forests have long receded.

Their terraformation of the llanos allows Las Gaviotas to thrive, but it is not an example of low impact ecology practised by many eco-villages. Las Gaviotas is largely apolitical, a strategy which has allowed it to grow amidst the cocaine growers, paramilitary organizations, insurgent guerrilla groups, and military troops present in the Llanos. The village is further separated from many eco-anarchist movements because of its early ties to the United Nations and the Colombian government.

== History ==
=== Early days and support from the United Nations ===
Paolo Lugari first saw the Colombian Llanos in 1966 when his uncle, Tomás Castrillón, who was the minister of Public Works at the time, took him on an inspection flight to the Llanos. Paolo was captivated by the seemingly empty landscape and soon after travelled to Vichada by car with his brother. After days of travel they found a couple of deserted buildings from the abandoned construction of a highway through the Llanos. Lugari chose this place to start a community; he staked 10,000 hectares around the abandoned buildings and started a non-profit called El Centro las Gaviotas. The day the brothers arrived they saw river gulls (gaviotas in Spanish) and chose this as the name for the project.

Lugari envisioned Gaviotas as a laboratory for a tropical civilization. Lugari theorized that in order to accommodate Colombia's growing population, people would either have to settle the Amazon or Chocó regions, destroying some of the richest rainforest in the planet as was already happening in the Andean regions of Colombia. Lugari wanted to see if the Llanos could be made inhabitable while rejecting reliance on technology and knowledge from distant, temperate places like the United States and Europe. The Llanos were very sparsely populated apart from Guahibo peoples and refugees from La Violencia, which for Lugari made the region an ideal testing ground for a new tropical way of living.

Lugari started bringing academics and engineers to Gaviotas such as Sven Zethelius to get involved with the project. In 1970, Zethelius, the son of a Swedish immigrant to Colombia, told Lugari about the greenhouse gas effect and the rapid loss of biodiversity across the entire planet. He encouraged Lugari to create an alternative way of living, a bio-system, in harmony with nature if he was serious about settling the Llanos. Gaviotas started bringing many university students to experiment and design new technologies that could be used in the harsh environment of the Llanos. Different water pumps, soil cement, windmills or any kind of device that could help people and be adapted to local conditions were encouraged. Most students came from Universidad de Los Andes and Universidad Nacional, and many Peace Corps volunteers from the US also spent time in Gaviotas in the early days, but gradually left.

In the first years, the population of Gaviotas was about 20 people; many Guahibo people helped build houses and hammocks. The Guahibo asked for a school, and Lugari was able to build the school and also bring nurses regularly to Gaviotas. Given the oil embargo of 1973, Gaviotas gained notoriety for their methodologies focusing on the use of renewable energy. Many journalists came to visit the community, as well as a delegation from the United Nations Development Programme (UNDP). The UNDP declared Gaviotas a model community and started providing funding, which helped Gaviotas continue to develop technology and employ people. By the late 1970s, Gaviotas had grown to around 200 people, and a visit from the UNDP in 1979 secured a new round of funding after the delegates saw the impressive water pump and windmill technology Gaviotas had developed.

However, also in the late 1970s, Colombia's internal conflict was intensifying and insurgent groups started taking over the Llanos in and around Gaviotas. Insurgent groups set up roadblocks and charged protection money to locals. On several occasions, Gaviotas was papered with FARC leaflets and FARC insurgents forced Gaviotans to gather for indoctrination. The community chose to remain neutral and banned weapons from Gaviotas. It became generally known that Gaviotas was neutral and their staff were generally respected as they travelled across the region. Both the military and insurgent armed groups used Gaviotas for operations, usually without community consent, and Gaviotas' all-solar hospital was used by both wounded military and insurgent soldiers, sometimes being treated side by side.

A new hospital was built in the mid 1980s that needed no air conditioning and fully ran on solar energy. Photovoltaic solar energy was not used since the technology was prohibitively expensive at the time, but different forms of solar technology were used instead, like convection solar heaters to sterilize water. The local Guahibo had been important partners in developing Gaviotas and used the old hospital regularly, but they considered being locked indoors away from family to be the opposite of healing, so a separate wing was added to the hospital. Local Guahibos designed and built themselves a Gahibo maloca where patients could sleep in hammocks and have their relatives stay with them.

=== Loss of funding and pine plantations ===
In the late 1980s Gaviotas suffered significant financial blows. The UNDP stopped funding and the Colombian Central Mortgage Bank stopped investing in social housing, meaning that Gaviotas stopped receiving large contracts to install their solar water heating technology, so they started only selling piecemeal contracts to affluent individuals. However, out of this crisis came the solution that has become the symbol of Gaviotas, its Caribbean pine plantations. Hundreds of crops had been tested at Gaviotas, with virtually all failing due to the thin, acidic soil of the Llanos. Only in the gallery forests is the soil good enough to grow crops. At a conference in Caracas, an agronomist suggested that Lugari test pine seedlings from Honduras. The first Caribbean pines were planted from seeds brought from la Mosquitia by Lugari. The first trees were planted in 1983, when they were 8 years old, incisions were made on the bark to see if resin could be collected, every 12 days a new incision was made higher up the tree according to the instructions of a Venezuelan pine plantation. After 36 days the yield of pine resin was equivalent to what should be produced by 25-year-old trees according to manuals. Through this pine resin, Gaviotas found a way to become financially independent, since the resin is used in the manufacturing of paints, varnishes, and other products, and Colombian companies had been importing resin for decades. Gaviotas was able to serve this market and also found other commercial applications for the resin. Furthermore, the pine trees produce sap that the people collect, process, and sell as colophony, turpentine, and rosin for stringed instruments' bows.

Mycorrhizal network

In 1982, Sven Zethelius had theorized that the pine trees would require help from mycorrhiza to properly digest the Llanos soil, which was later confirmed during their visit to a Venezuelan plantation. A Venezuelan company donated 3 kilos of Pizolithus tinctorius, which does not occur naturally in the Llanos. Soon they realized that only one application of the fungus was enough, unlike the Venezuelan plantations which had to reapply fungus continually. The Gaviotas pines were also growing surprisingly fast. It was theorized in the community that since Gaviotas did not use herbicides as is common practice in plantations, the mycorrhiza was thriving and needed no further help. Also, since no herbicides were being used, an entire understory of vines, shrubs and trees started to grow under the pines, which commercial forestry plantations advise against to avoid competition, but given that the pines were growing so healthily, Gaviotans sensed that the diversity of plants was helping the soil improve and benefitted the pine trees.

In light of the V Centenary celebrations organized by Spain, Lugari made a proposal to the Spanish government to help afforest and reforest millions of hectares in South America, but the Spanish government refused. The Japanese government, however, did provide funding that allowed Gaviotas to plant a further 2,000 hectares with Caribbean pines. Another 1,500 were planted around the same time with a forestry grant from the Colombian government.

As Gaviotas planted pines, a whole new forest grew where only grasses could survive earlier. This led to an explosion of fauna and flora in the plantations. It is unclear if there were dormant seeds in the ground or if birds and other animals drop seeds that make the basis of the new forest, but in the end Gaviotas was able to simultaneously find an economic activity to support itself and provide a platform for biodiversity to thrive. The new forest growing in what was formerly savanna meant that all of Gaviotas' operations became carbon negative, and an estimated 250 species have been found to grow in the Gaviotas forests.

=== Stagnation after resin boom ===
By the mid 2000s, Gaviotas also started experimenting with mixed plantations of African oil palms and other plants. the hypothesis was that similarly to the pine trees, oil palms would grow better amongst other plants instead of as a monoculture. The oil palms were used to make biofuel to feed all of Gaviotas' machines and vehicles, making the community fuel self-sufficient.

Lugari's initial intention was to settle the Llanos, finding ways to support large populations here in a manner that was not environmentally destructive. However, the population of Gaviotas was still only around 200 people 30 years after founding, although around 2000 people still made a living through Gaviotas and many families in the region sent their children to study at the Gaviotas school. Gaviotas had generated much enthusiasm throughout the 1980s and 1990s, with president Belisario Betancur proposing to build a city called Tropicalia which would essentially be a large-scale replication of Gaviotas. However, Gaviotas struggled to grow past the mid 1990s. As much as armed groups respected Gaviotas' neutrality, the armed conflict put many government plans on the back burner and deeply affected Colombia's economy. The entire Llanos region became a no-go zone for many, to the point Gaviotas had to discourage foreign visitors since foreigners became prime targets for kidnappings. This was also one of the reasons manufacturing was more concentrated in Gaviotas' factory in Bogotá.

Different factors also meant Gaviotas continued to struggle economically. After supplying virtually the entire Colombian market for pine resin, China flooded the market with cheap resin from its western provinces, sending prices plummeting. Gaviotas had to diversify and started selling bottled water from the clean aquifers under their forest. Their bottles were designed like Legos that could fit with each other, and were used as toys that became known as "poor people's Legos" or were filled with sand and used as bricks for construction. Gaviotas sold water bottles to many upscale restaurants, stipulating that all bottles must be returned to Gaviotas to be repurposed.

== Guiding principles of Gaviotas ==
Gaviotas was defined by Lugari as a "human settlement of tropical rationality". The driving principle behind Gaviotas was to shed the colonial tradition of countries like Colombia of being dependent on the cultural and technological dictates from northern countries. Ten founding principles were outlined as Gaviotas was established:

1. Productive harmony with nature, not simply contemplative harmony
2. Bioclimatic urbanism and architecture
3. Use of local resources when applicable for high technology
4. Proximity of housing to work. Distances should be able to be travelled by foot or bicycle, to allow us to be free but with a feeling of belonging to a community
5. Level and quality of life. Urbanism and architecture to integrate the family, not isolate members
6. Preference for small and medium scales so nature's restorative forces can act in time in the restoration of environmental equilibrium, either independently or with technological help
7. Creation of spaces for casual encounters, spontaneous dialogue, unexpected questions that fuel continuous creativity
8. Distant, tranquil settlements on the Colombian frontier, but not in-communicated. In the era of knowledge and speed of communications, all distances have been erased. Everything must be close enough to share, but never to harm the individuality of others
9. For the tropical environment there are no pre-established rules, because diversity makes up its rationality. In Gaviotas, a human settlement is by definition an integrated whole that invites community participation. The polar opposite is the prevailing disorder in a world of fragmented cities
10. Energy self-sufficiency. With the use of renewable energy sources: mini-hydro, solar, wind, biomass. Because they feed on permanent residues that flow from nature itself or from human use of its resources.

Gaviotas has a deep commitment and interest in technology, but they believe technology needs to work for the enrichment of human existence, and not become a steamroller that turns on its inventors and crushes them. Furthermore, this technology needs to reduce environmental harm compared to its alternatives, improve nature in some way or at the very least minimize harm as much as possible.

Many visitors and journalists over the years have defined Gaviotas as a utopia, a characterization that Lugari and Gaviotans reject. A utopia literally means "no place", so Gaviotas is referred to as a "topia" because it is real. It is a place of action and experimentation rather than an idealized place.

Governments from Thailand, Malaysia, Caribbean countries and even China wanted to implement programs to replicate what Gaviotas did, but Lugari felt it was impossible to replicate because Gaviotas is the antithesis of a government program, which are too linear; it is more of combination of random occurrences born out of chaos. Lugari defines Gaviotas as the Uncertainty Principle. In principle, this contradicts the initial goal of creating a new way of life for widespread settlement, since it cannot be replicated, but many of the innovations coming out of Gaviotas have been shared with the world and benefitted thousands of people.

== Ecological impacts ==
=== Local ecology ===
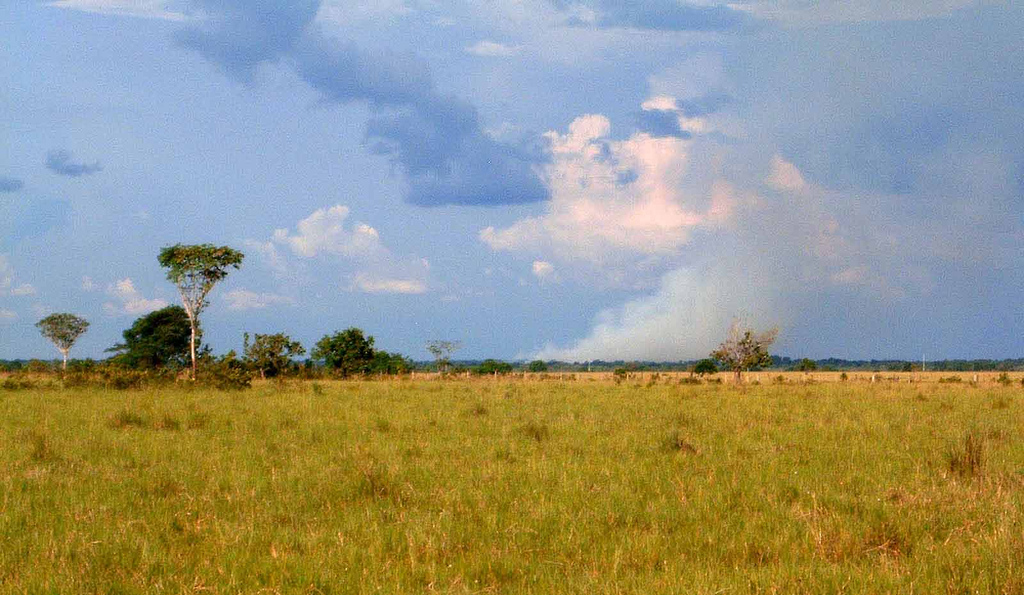
The Llanos

Gaviotas is situated in the Llanos, an ecoregion defined by flat grasslands with dispersed islands of gallery forests growing along rivers and streams, which have a rich variety of palm species. It's classified as a savanna ecosystem. Being quite close to the equator, the land receives intense sunlight and a high amount of precipitation at around 2,700mm annually. In fact, studies suggest that a large portion of the Orinoco watershed, covering most of the Llanos, could have continuous tree cover according to rain and temperature patterns. Vichada itself sits in the transition zone between the Amazon and Llanos ecosystems, local vegetation and floristic relationships in the gallery forests where Gaviotas is located resembles many aspects of the Colombian Amazon. The Orinoco watershed in general has a wide mosaic of forests, shrublands and grasslands, but the area surrounding Gaviotas for hundreds of square kilometers is defined by grassland.

Fossil pollen records show that the Amazon rainforest has expanded and contracted through the region across glacial periods. The rainforest expanded through the Holocene but throughout the Llanos it has receded over the past 2.3 thousand years giving way to a savanna ecosystem dominated by grasslands. It has been theorized that human impact has had an influence on the recent retreat of the rainforest, evidence of human impact on the savanna ecosystem seems to be quite strong, particularly in the late Holocene. In any case, it is known that the grasslands Lugari chose to develop Gaviotas in have been covered by forest in the past, but in the present it is notoriously hard to grow anything on this land. The soil is highly acidic, thin, and has aluminum levels that are close to toxic. Other afforestation projects close to Gaviotas have seen a staggering rate of failure for planted seedlings, with the main cause of failure being withering. Yet, Gaviotas has successfully planted thousands of hectares in which structurally complex, diverse forests are thriving.

=== Pine forests ===
A government forester had spent years trying unsuccessfully to get native and exotic species to grow in Gaviotas by the time Lugari came back from Venezuela with the idea to plant Caribbean pines. Lugari did think that this was a species that was perfectly suited to local conditions, which was later confirmed by biologist Catherine Caulfield, who found pockets of Caribbean pine populations dispersed around the Amazon. Seedlings are initially grown hydroponically since the soil is so poor, with the help of an artificial pond fed by windmill pumps. During the first three months seedlings are given a small boost of potassium, magnesium, and boron. In order to encourage mycorrhiza, the Pizolithus tinctorius fungus is also applied by a mixture of water with a powder made from ground mushroom caps.

As plants were allowed to grow under the now moist and cool shade of the pine trees, an Indigenous forest grew under the pine canopy. This was never the intention of Gaviotas, it was in fact an accident of experimentation, but it has become a point of pride and a cornerstone for the community's approach of environmentally restorative ways of life. Apart from gallery forests, the land was always characterized by only a few species of grasses, but now 250 plant species have been identified in the Gaviotas forests. Within just 5 years of planting it is estimated that biomass in the ecosystem multiplied by 16 and biodiversity increased substantially. Also, the forest is now large enough that it has created a microclimate around Gaviotas, increasing precipitation and maintaining cooler temperatures under the canopy. The cool temperatures and moist environment created by inside-forest conditions under a closed canopy also provide a plethora of microhabitats for many species. Large amounts of fauna have moved into the Gaviotas forests including deer, anteaters, capybaras, eagles, armadillos, tapirs, pumas, and more.

Areas planted with trees saw a decrease in grasses, sedges, and leguminoseae species, and an increase in melastomataceae, dilleniaceae, rubiaceae, hypericaceae species. Planted areas have also seen the development of a complex forest structure with a shrub layer, understory, subcanopy, and canopy. Structurally diverse and complex forests with canopy closure are key for species richness and species diversity; it often takes decades after tree planting to reach structural complexity, but this happens faster in the tropics and happened surprisingly fast at Gaviotas.

== Technological innovations ==
=== Principles for technological development ===
Early on Gaviotas adopted a set of technological principles, which were: technologies must be low cost so countries that do not have financial resources can access them; technologies must be manually intensive enough to promote employment but still be competitive in the market; low income populations must be able to access the technologies; pollution levels must be zero or very close to zero; research and development must be accessible to individuals of all education levels as well as undisciplined minds with a creative instinct; and technology must be designed to meet the demands of disadvantaged individuals and communities, not necessarily foreign capital interests.

Gaviotas has created many technological innovations over the years, including a double action water pump, a one-man manual cement mixer, windmills suited to the Llanos, a pedal-powered cassava grinder that reduces 10 hours of labour into 1, a one-handed sugar cane press, a see-saw sleeve pump, a solar kettle for sterilizing water, solar heating panels, a low cost technique for building artificial ponds by using chicken wire and soil cement, and more.

Since already-existing solutions are often very costly to adapt, Gaviotas' innovations are often simple changes to a means of production that make otherwise expensive products available at affordable prices. Gaviotas has always refused to patent their developments to be able to share them freely.

=== Windmills ===
In light of the goal to harness renewable energy and work with nature, Gaviotas spent years designing windmill prototypes. 57 windmill prototypes were tested until the 58th was deemed successful, it consists of 5 aluminum blades with each blade torqued to turn leeward, which eliminated the need for a tail. The Gaviotas windmill has various uses such as drawing water from wells. It has become so widely adopted across the Llanos that they ran out of customers since virtually every farm, ranch or household that could use a windmill has one.

=== Water pumps ===
One of the most widespread Gaviotas developments is a water pump that can tap aquifers six times as deep as conventional pumps with less effort being expended. While conventional pumps raise and lower a heavy piston in a pipe through atmospheric pressure, Gaviotas engineers created pumps that leave the piston in place and instead lift and lower a cheap, light PVC sleeve around the piston. This was specially useful in the Llanos since in the dry season the water table lowers so much that people are forced to drink surface water, which is often dirty and carries diseases. Gaviotas' double action pump won the 1978 National Science Price in Colombia.

A see-saw sleeve pump to draw water from wells was also developed. During a lesson in the Gaviotas school on the concept of levers to explain pumps, a child remarked how the pump handle resembled half of a see-saw. That same night Gaviotas engineers built a see-saw sleeve pump, so children playing on the see-saw could replenish the school's water tank. The see-saw sleeve pump has also been installed widely around Colombia, and so inspired United Nations delegates in 1979 that it was part of the reason UNDP funding was extended that year.

An analysis of the Gaviotas manual pump found that it has very high levels of volumetric efficiency, although the pump showed a significant decrease in efficiency when drawing water from 20 meters of depth and under.

=== Solar energy ===
Gaviotas has leveraged many forms of solar energy. They developed solar heating panels to provide hot water, which were installed in Gaviotas homes and housing developments in Medellín. The original design was not suited for Bogotá, however, since at 2,600 meters of altitude (9,000 ft) the city has a cooler climate and is often overcast. Therefore, engineers needed to figure out a way to concentrate diffused light. Inspired by a silica film with an ultra-oxidized layer that Gaviotas engineers studied in London, Alonso Gutiérrez stripped a copper sheet clean in a bath of nitric acid, rinsed it, then aggressively oxidized it by dipping it into a solution of copper sulfate dissolved in sulfuric and hydrochloric acids. The final result was a thick and deeply black film. Alonso estimated that it was even more effective than the British version and it worked remarkably well in accumulating heat even in cool, cloudy conditions. They also designed spherical water storage tanks to compress the greatest volume into the least amount of space. With the new design, Gaviotas was able to install solar heating collectors all over Bogotá, including 30,000 person Ciudad Tunal, at the time the largest public housing complex in the world to use only solar energy to heat its water.

=== Healthcare advances ===
When the new Gaviotas hospital was built in the 1980s, they designed a self-powered, functional hospital that ran only on solar energy. In the 1990s the Colombian government passed new legislation and pressured the hospital to close its doors. The hospital is no longer operational and the building is now used as a biofuel factory. Gaviotas was also able to procure thousands of measles vaccines when a measles epidemic was sweeping through Guahibo populations in the Llanos.

=== Other advances ===
Gaviotas also designed a two-cylinder steam engine to use the steam from resin processing to generate electricity, which helped Gaviotas finally become energy self-sufficient after years of using diesel generators when needed.

Given the often impassable road to Bogotá from Gaviotas, transporting materials and products back and forth between the capital and Gaviotas is expensive and often difficult. There was also the issue to armed groups setting up roadblocks on the only road leading to the Llanos from Bogotá. Therefore, Gaviotas engineers had dreamed to build a Zeppelin to carry cargo to and from Bogotá. It turns out they massively underestimated how difficult it is to haul heavy cargo on a lighter-than-air dirigible, but they did build a Zeppelin and use it to monitor wildfires across the thousands of forest hectares that Gaviotas manages.

=== Failures ===
Many of Gaviotas' innovations, despite being technically clever and functional, were not successful culturally and socially. For instance, the pedal-powered cassava grinder failed to take off even though cassava is a crucially important staple in rural South America. Bicycle riding is traditionally a masculine activity in South America because of the widespread belief that bike seats cause injuries to female genitalia. The pedal cassava grinder, therefore, took this role away from women. Since cassava is so crucial in keeping families fed, cassava grinding is a socially significant role and important to women's self-esteem. When they did operate the grinder, women complained about now having too much free time on their hands and also complained that it changed their relationship with their children since they did not spend time with them milling the cassava. This and many other Gaviotas innovations performed well technically but for different reasons failed to be adopted socially.

== Social impacts ==
Gaviotas have provided a livelihood for many Indigenous Guahibo, settlers in the region, and refugees. The relationship between the Guahibo and Gaviotas goes back to the very founding of Gaviotas, when Guahibo individuals helped build the first houses. Over the years there have been many reciprocal agreements, such as when it was arranged that Gaviotas engineers would teach the Guahibo how to dig and construct sewage channels and the Guahibo would teach the engineers how to build waterproof palm leaf roofs. The Guahibo were also able to design and build a maloca when the new Gaviotas hospital was built, so Guahibo patients could be treated according to their preferences, surrounded by family.

The Gaviotas windmill and water pump designs were adopted widely across the Llanos and beyond. The Gaviotas water pump design led to a regional decline in cattle death as many ranchers now had access to underground aquifers during dry season. The water-heating solar panels were installed by the thousands all across Medellín, Bogotá, and around Colombia, providing a low cost and low maintenance way to have access to warm water.

The Gaviotas factory in Bogotá trained children from slums to become solar technicians, and some even went on to live in Gaviotas later on.

== Broader impacts ==
Gaviotas raised much attention and praise internationally. The community has been visited by Colombian president Belisario Betancur, Nobel Prize winner Gabriel García Márquez, prime minister of Spain Felipe Gonzales, co-founder of Club of Rome Aurelio Peccei, the Chinese ambassador to Colombia, among others. Books about Gaviotas have been published in Colombia, the United States, Korea, China, and Japan. Between 1983 and 1987, six films were made about Gaviotas by Gaviotas member Pepe Gómez. The films were shown in Canada, Venezuela, Curaçao, Nicaragua, Haiti, Dominican Republic, France, Netherlands, Peru, England, and Paraguay. A play, named "Entusiamo!" was also made about Gaviotas in Portland, Oregon, based on Alan Weisman's book A Village to Reinvent the World. Parts of the play were reproduced by New York Times, Los Angeles Times, and NPR.

Gaviotas was named a leading example of appropriate technology in the Third World by the World Conference of Technological Cooperation Among Developing Countries. Technicians from Chile and Costa Rica came to learn pump designs, Honduran technicians came to learn windmill design, communities in Bolivia replicated the Gaviotas solar collector design, and a sleeve pump was installed in Veracruz by Gaviotas technicians (apart from the many sleeve pumps installed in Colombia). Gaviotas was also awarded the 1997 World Prize in Zero Emissions from the United Nations' Zero Emissions Research Initiative.

== Climate ==
Las Gaviotas has a hot and humid tropical monsoon climate (Köppen Am) with a short dry season from December to February. The average rainfall at Gaviotas is around 2,700mm, although highly variable. Average annual temperature is 27 °C.

Climate data for Gaviotas
| Month | Jan | Feb | Mar | Apr | May | Jun | Jul | Aug | Sep | Oct | Nov | Dec | Year |
|---|---|---|---|---|---|---|---|---|---|---|---|---|---|
| Mean daily maximum °C (°F) | 33 (91) | 34 (93) | 34 (93) | 32 (90) | 30 (86) | 29 (84) | 29 (84) | 30 (86) | 31 (88) | 31 (88) | 31 (88) | 32 (90) | 31 (88) |
| Daily mean °C (°F) | 27 (81) | 28 (82) | 28 (82) | 27 (81) | 26 (79) | 25 (77) | 24 (75) | 25 (77) | 25 (77) | 26 (79) | 26 (79) | 26 (79) | 26 (79) |
| Mean daily minimum °C (°F) | 21 (70) | 22 (72) | 23 (73) | 23 (73) | 23 (73) | 22 (72) | 22 (72) | 22 (72) | 22 (72) | 22 (72) | 23 (73) | 22 (72) | 22 (72) |
| Average rainfall mm (inches) | 27 (1.1) | 49 (1.9) | 125 (4.9) | 254 (10.0) | 351 (13.8) | 449 (17.7) | 326 (12.8) | 299 (11.8) | 291 (11.5) | 266 (10.5) | 187 (7.4) | 72 (2.8) | 2,696 (106.2) |
| Average rainy days | 5 | 5 | 9 | 18 | 24 | 26 | 26 | 23 | 21 | 20 | 16 | 8 | 201 |
| Mean monthly sunshine hours | 246 | 215 | 185 | 143 | 130 | 102 | 119 | 135 | 145 | 166 | 181 | 225 | 1,992 |
Source: The Weather Network

== See also ==
- Llanos
- Caribbean pine
- Afforestation
- Reforestation
- Biodiversity
- Renewable energy
- Climate change
