= Little Venice (disambiguation) =

Little Venice is a district in London.

Little Venice may also refer to:

- Little Venice (ward), an electoral ward of the Westminster City Council
- Little Venice, Michigan, an unincorporated area northwest of Charlotte, Michigan
- Klein-Venedig (German for Little Venice), the name for a failed German attempt to settle Venezuela in the 16th century
  - Venezuela, Spanish for Little Venice
- Petite Venise, at the Palace of Versailles
- A nickname for Chioggia, Italy

== See also ==
- Venice (disambiguation)
- Venice of the North
