= Venezia (disambiguation) =

Venezia is the Italian name for the city of Venice.

Venezia may also refer to:

== Places ==
- Piazza Venezia, a piazza in Rome, Italy
- Palazzo Venezia, a palace in Rome, Italy
- Porta Venezia, a district of Milan, Italy
- Corso Venezia, a street in Milan, Italy
- Porta Venezia (Milan Metro), a metro station in Milan
- Venezia (Rome Metro), a planned metro station in Rome
- Venezia, Arizona, a populated place in Yavapai County, Arizona

== People ==
- Eugenio Da Venezia (1900–1992), Italian painter
- Mike Venezia (1945–1988), American jockey
- Morris Venezia (1921–2013), Jewish-Italian-Greek Holocaust survivor
- Shlomo Venezia (1923–2012), Greek-born Italian Jewish Holocaust survivor

== Music ==
- Venezia, song cycle in Italian by Reynaldo Hahn
- Venezia, classical recital album by Max Emanuel Cencic
- "Venezia", a German poem set by Felix Draeseke
- "Venezia (song)", a 1983 single by Spanish group Hombres G
- "Venezia", a song from Athena, a 1954 American musical
- "Venezia", a Japanese song by Ryuichi Sakamoto from the album Left Handed Dream
- Venezia 2000, an album by Rondò Veneziano

== Ships ==
- Italian ironclad Venezia, a warship built in the 1860s
- Citta de Venezia, the original name for Chilean transport ship Angamos, a transport ship launched in 1890
- Hanjin Venezia, a container ship launched in 2001
- Venezia (ferry), a Ro-Pax ferry launched in 2004
- Carnival Venezia, a cruise ship launched in 2018

== Other uses ==
- Venezia FC, an Italian football club
- Operation Venezia, a Second World War operation

== See also ==
- "Bella Venezia", an Italian fairy tale
- Venice (disambiguation)
