= Venice Township =

Venice Township may refer to:

- Venice Township, Madison County, Illinois
- Venice Township, Shiawassee County, Michigan
- Venice Township, Seneca County, Ohio

See also

- Venice (disambiguation)
