= Venice in media =

List of references to Venice, Italy, in various media

This list explores the instances of which the city of Venice, Italy, has been mentioned or alluded to in various media.

== Audio dramas referencing Venice ==
- The BBC 7 Doctor Who audio drama adventure, The Stones of Venice (2005), is set in a future where one last great Carnival is being held before the city sinks forever

== Films referencing Venice ==
(Chronological)

- Destiny (1921), directed by Fritz Lang, starring Lil Dagover and Rudolf Klein-Rogge.
- Othello (1952), directed by Orson Welles, starring Orson Welles and Suzanne Cloutier
- Senso (1954), directed by Luchino Visconti, starring Alida Valli and Farley Granger
- Summertime (1955), directed by David Lean, starring Katharine Hepburn. Based on The Time of the Cuckoo. Interiors shot in Pensione Accademia Villa Maravegie
- Venice, the Moon and You (1959), directed by Dino Risi
- From Russia with Love (1963), a James Bond film directed by Terence Young
- The Avenger of Venice (1964), directed by Piero Pierotti and Carlo Campogalliani.
- The Honey Pot (1967), directed by Joseph L. Mankiewicz, (based on Ben Jonson's Volpone), starring Rex Harrison, Capucine, Maggie Smith
- Death in Venice (1971), directed by Luchino Visconti, base on the Thomas Mann novella
- Who Saw Her Die? (1972), directed by Aldo Lado and Vittorio De Sisti.
- Don't Look Now (1973), directed by Nicolas Roeg, based on story by Daphne du Maurier, starring Donald Sutherland and Julie Christie
- Fellini's Casanova (1976), directed by Federico Fellini)
- The Forbidden Room (1977), directed by Dino Risi.
- Solamente Nero (1978), also known as The Bloodstained Shadow, directed by Antonio Bido
- Damned in Venice (1978), also known as Nero veneziano, directed by Ugo Liberatore.
- Who Is Killing the Great Chefs of Europe? (1978), directed by Ted Kotcheff, based upon the novel by Nan and Ivan Lyons
- A Little Romance (1979), directed by George Roy Hill
- Moonraker (1979), a James Bond film directed by Lewis Gilbert, (the first time principal photography for the series took place in the city)
- The Great Gambler (1979), directed by Shakti Samanta, starring Amitabh Bachchan, Neetu Singh, Zeenat Aman, Prem Chopra
- The Pleasure (1985), directed by Joe D'Amato, starring Andrea Guzon and Gabriele Tinti.
- Vampire in Venice (1988), directed by Augusto Caminito, starring Klaus Kinski, Christopher Plummer, and Donald Pleasence
- Indiana Jones and the Last Crusade (1989), directed by Steven Spielberg
- Shocking Dark (1989), directed by Bruno Mattei
- The Comfort of Strangers (1990), directed by Paul Schrader
- Nikita (1990), also known as La Femme Nikita, directed by Luc Besson
- Blame It On The Bellboy (1992), directed by Mark Herman
- Only You (1994), directed by Norman Jewison
- The Wings of the Dove (1997), directed by Iain Softley, based on novel by Henry James
- Everyone Says I Love You (1996), directed by Woody Allen
- Dangerous Beauty (1998), directed by Marshall Herskovitz, based on The Honest Courtesan by Margaret Rosenthal
- Children of the Century (1999) directed by D. Kurys, starring Juliette Binoche, Benoit Maginel, Stefano Dionisi
- The Story of Us (1999), directed by Rob Reiner, starring Bruce Willis, Michelle Pfeiffer, Tim Matheson
- The Talented Mr. Ripley (1999), directed by Anthony Minghella
- Bread and Tulips (2000), directed by Silvio Soldini
- Lara Croft: Tomb Raider (2001), directed by Simon West, based on the Tomb Raider video game series.
- Senso '45 (2002), Tinto Brass directed adaptation of the Senso story, set in 1945
- Just Married (2003), directed by Shawn Levy
- Pokémon Heroes (2003), directed by Jim Malone and Kunihiko Yuyama
- The Italian Job (2003), directed by F. Gary Gray
- The League of Extraordinary Gentlemen (2003), directed by Stephen Norrington
- The Merchant of Venice (2004), directed by Michael Radford
- Ocean's Twelve (2004), directed by Steven Soderbergh
- Chasing Liberty (2004), directed by Andy Cadiff, starring Mandy Moore and Stark Sands
- Casanova (2005), directed by Lasse Hallström, starring Heath Ledger and Sienna Miller
- Casino Royale (2006), a James Bond film directed by Martin Campbell
- The Thief Lord (2006), directed by Richard Claus, starring Aaron Johnson, Rollo Weeks
- Sharks In Venice (2008) is a made-for-TV action film starring Stephen Baldwin
- Venezzia (2009), directed by Haik Gazarian, a film based on real events; the role of Venezuela during World War II and a love story.

== Games referencing Venice ==
=== Board games ===
- Inkognito (1988) is a board game set in Venice.

=== Video games ===
(Alphabetical by series or game title)

- Assassin's Creed II features the city during the Renaissance Era.
- In the online game City of Heroes, the zone named "Founder's Falls" has an architectural resemblance to Venice.
- In the SNK game Fatal Fury 2, Andy Bogard's stage features Venice (with some inaccuracies, such as having the Leaning Tower of Pisa in the background) as you fight in a gondola down a canal. This is revisited in King of Fighters '96, where the Boss Team's Stage is set in Venice.
- Gears of War features a map that resembles Venice's canals
- You are able to take photographs of your tuned-up car in Gran Turismo 4 released on the PlayStation 2, in two locations in Venice, St. Marks Square, and also on a barge going under the Rialto Bridge.
- The canals of Venice are featured in the arcade racing game Hydro Thunder, in the hard-level track modeled after the city.
- The catacombs and the church of San Barnaba are visited in Indiana Jones and the Last Crusade: The Graphic Adventure.
- The Republic Of Venice is available as an initial playable faction in the game Medieval 2: Total War
- The Merchant Prince series is based on the trading and politics of Venice during the Renaissance era. The player plays one of the competing Venetian merchants trying to gain wealth and power through trades, power plays, and Machiavellian skullduggery.
- Ninja Gaiden Sigma 2 feature a city canals in chapter 6
- The first-person shooter Painkiller features a level called City On Water inspired by Venice.
- In Sid Meier's Civilization V, Venice appears as a playable nation.
- Venice is the second playable level in Sly 3: Honor Among Thieves.
- The 2006 version of Sonic the Hedgehog features a city based on Venice, Italy.
- A fighting arena based around Venice can be found in Soulcalibur. The fight takes place upon a stone platform isolated in Venice's water-filled streets. Typical residential Venice buildings are portrayed in the background of the level, although the fight does not take place in any of them.
- Venice was a location in the mobile game Subway Surfers as a part of "World Tour" updates in 2015, 2016, and 2019.
- The city of Venezia in Tales of Phantasia is modeled after Venice.
- Venice appears as a fighting arena in the first Tekken game released on the PlayStation.
- Venice is a multiplayer level in Free Radical Design's TimeSplitters: Future Perfect.
- Venice appears in Core Design's Tomb Raider 2.
- Venice by Cryo Networks is a strategy game set in 16th century Venice
- Venice is a casual game for Windows developed by Retro64
- Venetica features the city during the Renaissance Era. It is the main setting for the game.
- Voyage Century Online is a free nautical MMORPG developed by Snail Games and published by IGG, that features Venice as one of the Port Cities that can be used for commerce and exploration.
- The Sega video game House of the Dead 2 takes place in Venice.

== Music referencing Venice ==
(Alphabetical by artist)

- In 1960, French singer Charles Aznavour recorded Que C'est Triste Venise (How Sad Venice Is). Today, it is one of his most famous bilingual pieces, sung in both Italian (titled Com'è Triste Venezia) and French.
- Sophie Ellis-Bextor's video for "Catch You" was shot in Venice.
- Russian singer Dima Bilan's music video for the song 'На берегу неба' (Na Beregu Neba- On the shore of the sky) takes place in Venice.
- Death in Venecia opera in two acts composed by Benjamin Britten on 1973.
- Le carnaval de Venise is a comédie-lyrique in a prologue and three acts by the French composer André Campra. It was first performed on 20 January 1699 by the Académie royale de musique in the Salle du Palais-Royal in Paris.
- Aldo Donà composed and recorded the song Venezia, la luna e tu
- Le Marchand de Venise opera in two acts composed by Reynaldo Hahn premiered at Paris Opera on 25 March 1935.
- Madonna's music video for her song Like a Virgin (1984), directed by Mary Lambert, was shot in Venice, Italy. It features Madonna wearing a wedding dress, dancing on a gondola.
- In 1993, Venezuelan singer Ricardo Montaner released La Pequeña Venezia a video clip based on a song composed by María Teresa Chacín
- On July 15, 1989, Pink Floyd played live on a floating barge in the middle of The Grand Canal during their A Momentary Lapse of Reason tour.
- Much of the music of Rondò Veneziano has centred on Venetian themes. The Rondo Veneziano (2010) DVD features three music videos set in Venice
- Sandra's video for "Little Girl" was shot in Venice.
- The video for the Siouxsie and the Banshees song Dear Prudence was shot in Venice.
- The Merchant of Venice opera composed by André Tchaikowsky, premiered on Bregenz Festival on 18 July 2013
- The music video of the song Mhm Mhm by Manuel Riva, published in 2016, was shot in Venice.

== Television shows and episodes referencing Venice ==
(Alphabetical by series)

- In The Adventures of Super Mario Bros. 3, Mario and Luigi must save Venice from King Koopa.
- The manga ARIA take place in the town of Neo-Venezia, based on Venice.
- The fifth series Doctor Who episode, "The Vampires of Venice", takes place in the city in 1580.
- Several chapters of the manga Gunslinger Girl take place in Venice.
- The Jem episode "In Stitches" takes place in this city.
- In the manga One Piece, the island of Water 7 is based on Venice.
- An episode of The Scooby-Doo Show was set in Venice.
- In the 38th episode of the Tatsunoko anime Yatterman, made in 2008, the Yatterman and the Doronbo Team battle in Venice. The ring that was found on the Campanile de San Marco was taken by the Doronbo Team and it was a fake ring.

== Written works referencing Venice ==
=== Fiction (drama and literature) ===
(Alphabetical by author's surname)

- O Colar, a play by Portuguese author Sophia de Mello Breyner Andresen
- A Beautiful Crime (2020) – Christopher Bollen
- Watermark - Joseph Brodsky
- Relief - L.E.
- Invisible Cities - Italo Calvino
- Jonathan Strange and Mr. Norrell (2004) - Susanna Clarke
- The Haunted Hotel (1878) - Wilkie Collins
- Lionboy - Zizou Corder
- Little Dorrit - Charles Dickens
- Don't Look Now - Daphne du Maurier
- In the Company of the Courtesan (2006) - Sarah Dunant
- House of Niccolo series - Dorothy Dunnett
- 1634: The Galileo Affair - Eric Flint and Andrew Dennis
- The Thief Lord (2002) - Cornelia Funke
- The Silent Gondoliers - William Goldman under the name of S. Morgenstern
- Servant of Two Masters - Carlo Goldoni
- Across the River and Into the Trees - Ernest Hemingway
- The Talented Mr. Ripley (1955) - Patricia Highsmith
- Those Who Walk Away (1967) - Patricia Highsmith
- Stravaganza: City of Masks - Mary Hoffman
- Scorpia - Anthony Horowitz
- The Aspern Papers (1888) - Henry James
- The Wings of the Dove - Henry James
- Shylock's Daughter (1997) - Erica Jong
- Volpone (1606 / 1607) - Ben Jonson
- The Shadow of the Lion - Mercedes Lackey, Eric Flint and Dave Freer
- The Thief of Venice - Jane Langton
- The Time of the Cuckoo (1951) - Arthur Laurents
- Guido Brunetti crime series - Donna Leon
- The Bravo of Venice - M.G. Lewis
- Carnevale - Michelle Lovric
- The Floating Book - Michelle Lovric
- The Mourning Emporium - Michelle Lovric
- The Remedy - Michelle Lovric
- The Undrowned Child - Michelle Lovric
- Der Tod in Venedig (Death in Venice) (1912) - Thomas Mann
- The Comfort of Strangers - Ian McEwan
- The Water Mirror (2005) - Kai Meyer
- The Venice Adriana - Ethan Mordden
- Daughter of Venice - Donna Jo Napoli
- The Rossetti Letter (2007) - Christi Phillips
- The Assignation - Edgar Allan Poe
- The Family - Mario Puzo
- Vivaldi's Virgins (2007) - Barbara Quick
- Cry to Heaven - Anne Rice
- The Vampire Armand - Anne Rice
- Venise en hiver (Venice in the Winter) - Emmanuel Roblès
- The Desire and Pursuit of the Whole - Frederick Rolfe
- Der Geisterseher (The Ghost-Seer) - Friedrich Schiller
- An Equal Music - Vikram Seth
- The Merchant of Venice (1594–97) - William Shakespeare
- Othello (1603–04) - William Shakespeare
- Mystery of Venice series - Edward Sklepowich, an American Expatriate university lecturer teaching at Sousse Faculty of Arts and Humanities.
- Watteau in Venice (1994) - Philippe Sollers
- Territorial Rights - Muriel Spark
- Miss Garnet's Angel - Salley Vickers
- Candide - Voltaire
- Brideshead Revisited - Evelyn Waugh
- The Passion (1987) - Jeanette Winterson

=== Non-fiction ===
(Alphabetical by author's surname)

- John Berendt - The City of Falling Angels
- Casanova - History of My Life
- E.V. Lucas, A Wanderer in Venice
- Francesco da Mosto - Francesco's Venice
- Francesco da Mosto - Francesco's Italy
- Jane Turner Rylands - Venetian Stories
- Jane Turner Rylands - Across the Bridge of Sighs: More Venetian Stories
- John Ruskin - The Stones of Venice

=== Poetry ===
(Alphabetical by author's surname)

- T. S. Eliot - "Burbank with a Baedeker: Bleistein with a Cigar" (1920)
