= De Venecia =

de Venecia is a surname. Notable people with the surname include:

- Christopher de Venecia (born 1986), Filipino politician
- Gina de Venecia (born 1949), Filipino politician
- Joey de Venecia (born 1963), Filipino politician, son of Jose
- Jose de Venecia Jr. (1936–2026), Filipino politician

== See also ==
- Venecia (disambiguation)
