= Venice of Cieszyn =

Coordinates: 49°44′54.7″N 18°37′45.8″E

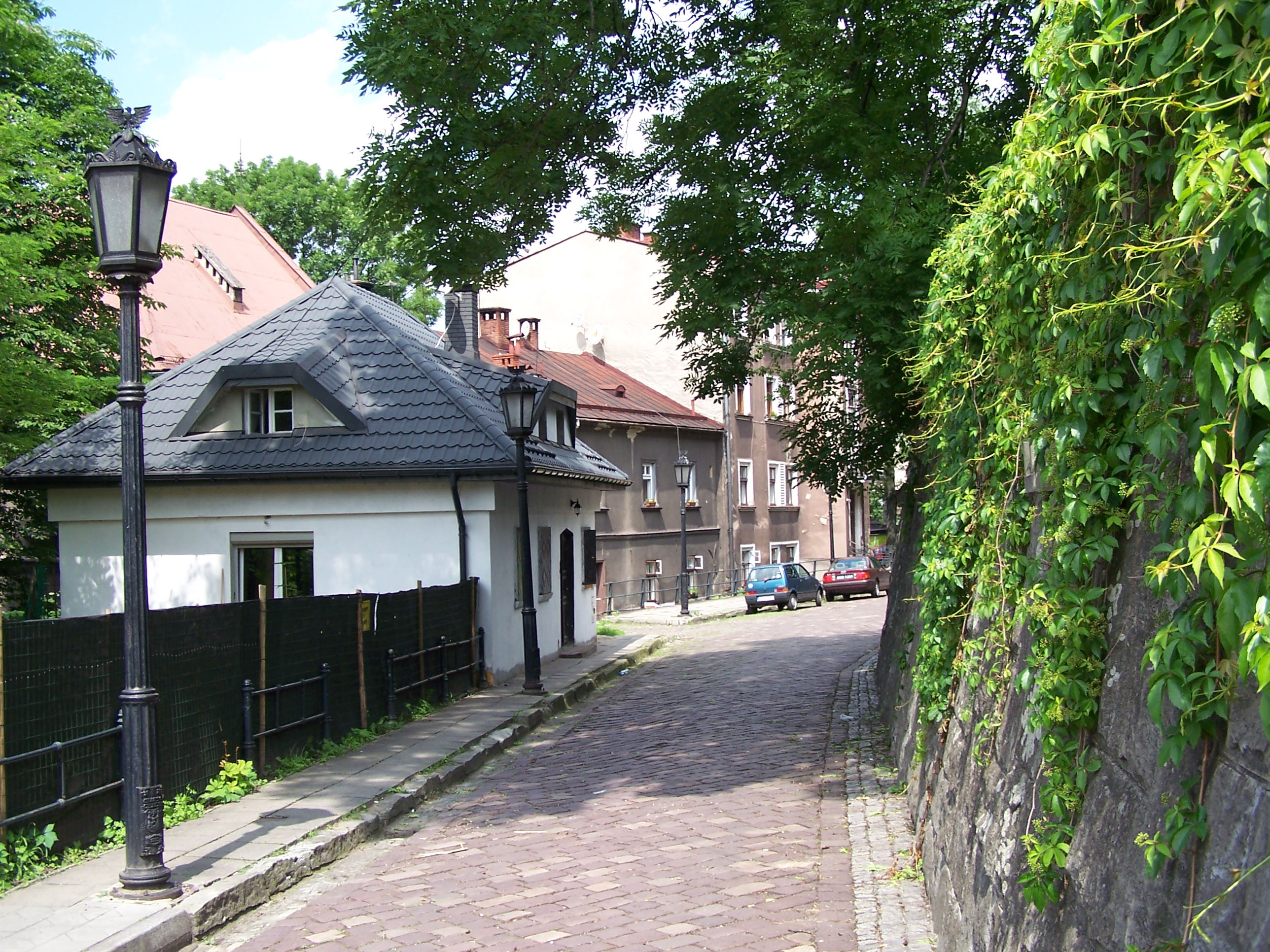
Przykopa Street in the Venice of Cieszyn

Venice of Cieszyn (Polish: Cieszyńska Wenecja) is a part of the Old Town in Cieszyn, Poland. It is a section of contemporary Przykopa Street (formerly Nad Młynówką) which comprises buildings from the 18th-19th century, many of them with bridges over the course of Młynówka (an artificial canal). In the past the buildings over Młynówka belonged to craftsmen: tanners, weavers, clothiers, leather-dressers and smiths, who needed constant access to water for their craft. It is the area between the intersection of Przykopa Street and Jan Łyska Avenue and the corner of Przykopa and Schodowa streets.

== The origin of the name ==
It is unknown when exactly the name Venice of Cieszyn entered everyday language. The term is based on a comparison of the street in Cieszyn located near an artificial watercourse with its several bridges over the canal to numerous canals of Italian Venice. There is no official document which would refer to the matter but it is assumed that this term emerged in the second half of the 20th century. The term Przykopa or Młynówka refers to the artificial watercourse at the foot of the scarp on which Cieszyn was founded. Afterwards the names referred to the suburbs of Cieszyn and then to a quarter of the city. The quarter of Przykopa was composed of the present streets: Przykopa, 3 Maja, Zamkowa and the Olza River.

== Historic monuments register ==
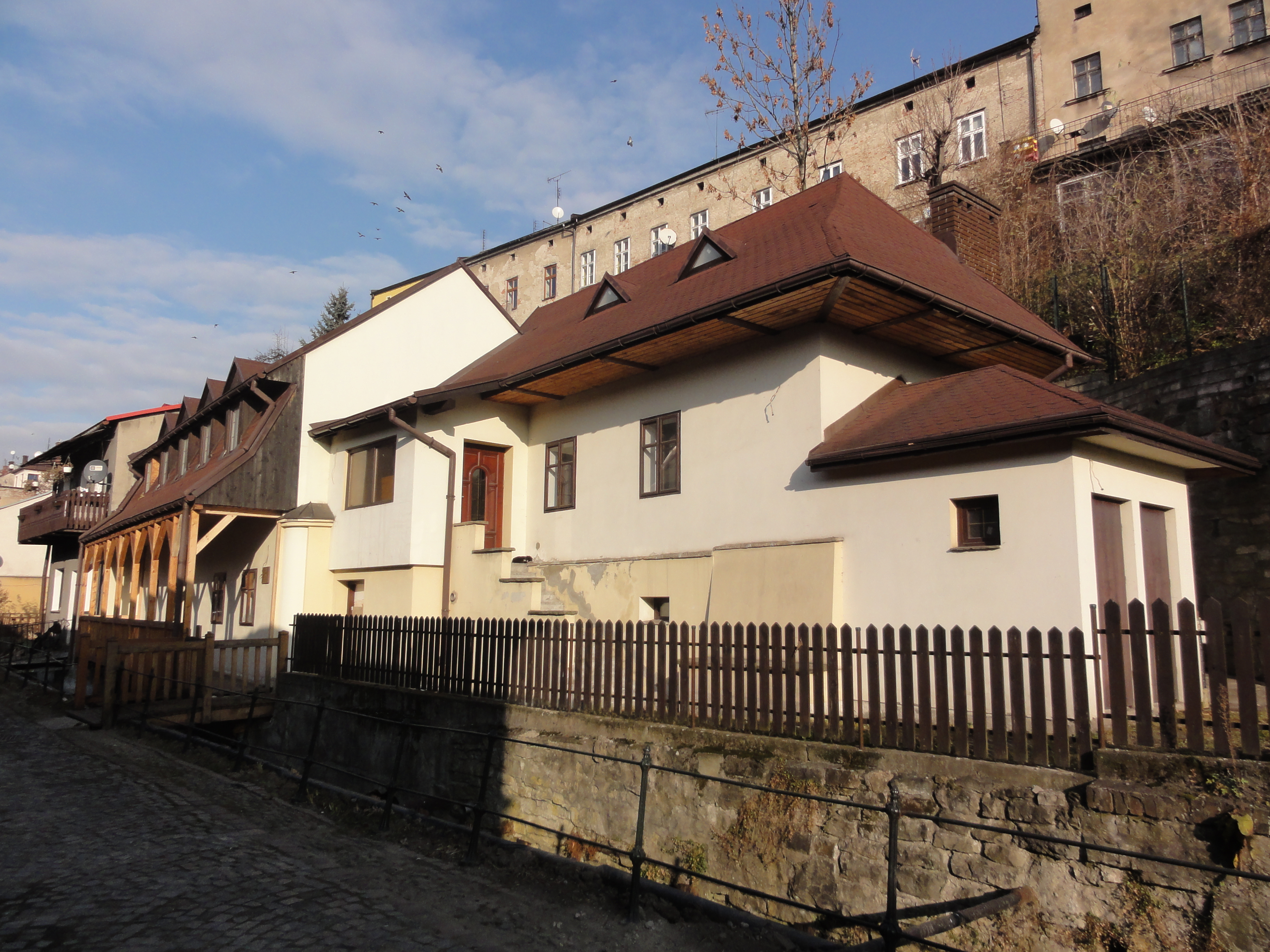
Przykopa Street, house no. 25

Some of the buildings of Venice of Cieszyn are registered in the Register of Historic Monuments of Silesian Voivodeship:

- Przykopa street, with retaining walls, 18th/19th century (registration number: A-442/86 dated 11.07.1986)
- House, Przykopa street 14, 19th century (registration number: 911/68 dated 29.07.1968 and A-218/77 dated 1.12.1977)
- House, Przykopa street 15, 19th century (registration number: 912/68 dated 29.07.1968 and A-219/77 dated 1.12.1977)
- House, Przykopa street 17, 1790 (registration number: 913/68 dated 29.07.1968 and A-220/77)
- House, Przykopa street 25, 18th, 19th and 20th century (registration number: 914/68 dated 29.11.1968 and A-221/77 dated 1.12.1977)

The oldest buildings come from the second half of the 18th century and the first half of the 19th century. The oldest object in this part of the city is a portal at a descent to the basement of building No. 26 dated back to the 16th-17th century.

== History and development ==
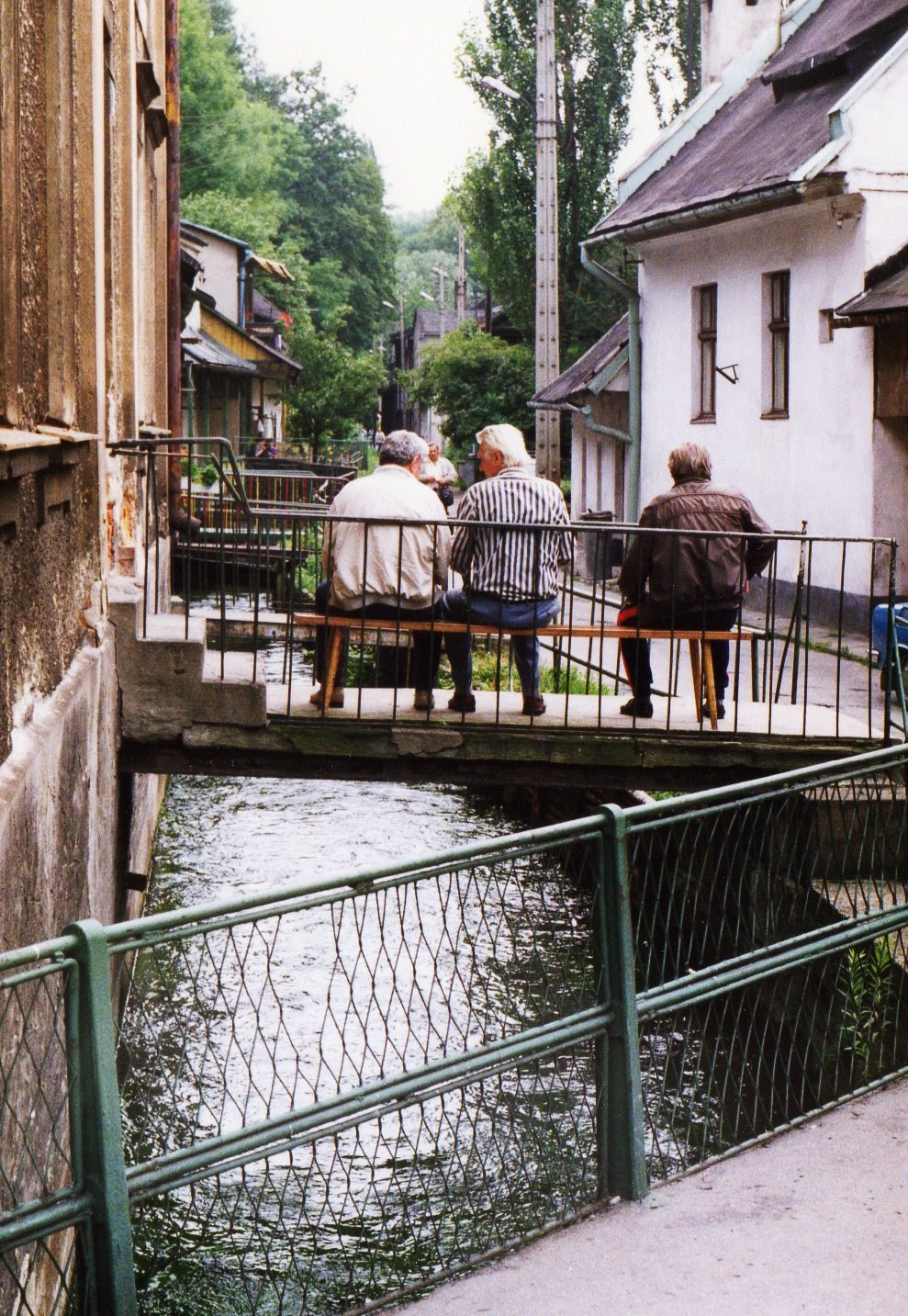
Młynówka canal in 1993

From the 16th century there was a farm located in the area of Przedmieście (the Suburbs). Its parcelling in the second half of the 17th century contributed to the economic development of this part of Cieszyn. At the end of the 17th century Przedmieście Przykopa was listed in “urbarze” - economic books of the Chamber of Cieszyn kept for the Habsburgs. In the said book from 1692 Przedmieście is described as: Bey der Wasser thor und an den Mühlgraben, which meant literally: By the Water Gate and at Młynówka. 35 surnames of property owners are registered there. In the census from 1830 in 42 homes there were 65 households and 290 inhabitants. On 20 March 1849 Przykopa was incorporated by municipal law into the administrative borders of Cieszyn and became a quarter of the city. In the second half of the 19th century in four consecutive population censuses for 1880-1910 there were 50 to 54 properties and the number of inhabitants increased from 561 to 669.

From the 16th century craftsmen settled at Młynówka: potters, clothiers, dyers, weavers and blacksmiths. Most of the buildings served them as their houses, although some of them were merely workshops (e.g. the tannery of Steffan family in the 18th century).

In the Middle Ages near the so-called Water Gate and a bridge located near the castle there were baths, which operated here from the end of the 14th century to the 1670s. Later they were relocated to Srebrna street.

The next building was a slaughterhouse, built for the Chamber of Habsburg family in Cieszyn in the second half of the 18th century, which after having bankrupted (due to strong competition) was purchased in 1889 by the Committee for construction of a bath in Cieszyn. At the site a new building was erected: The Imperial Baths in Cieszyn (the name changed later to; City Baths), was designed by a local architect Alojzy Jedek. The utility ensured access to public baths for inhabitants of Cieszyn. This was the most popular way of securing hygiene. The baths were liquidated in 1976 after new ones were constructed at Liburnia street.

The most important economic object of Przedmieście Przykopa was the so-called Great Mill, mentioned in 1461 in a document of the Duke of Cieszyn Przemysław II. In the vicinity of the mill were the prince's barns, which served as warehouses for grain and flour. The water mill used the stream of Młynówka to move a water wheel which milled grains of groats and cereals from the prince's farms. The flour produced was sold or used in the castle kitchen. After several fires in the second half of the 17th century, the mill was destroyed and later reconstructed in the 18th century. From that time it fulfilled its purpose to the 1930s. In 1932-1939 the mill was owned by a Jewish married couple Leon and Maria Hochsteinn who opened a water power station there. After World War II the facility was taken over by Knitting Industry Plant Juwenia, and the power station was liquidated in 1965.

The end of the 19th century is associated with a change in the characteristics of Przykopa from a craftsmen area to an industrial quarter. The first big investment goes back to 1895 - it was the Tannery of Soft and Hard Leather of Zygmunt Kohn. The next were the Iron Furniture and Metal Plates Factory of Jan Juraszek and the Furniture Factory of Jan Tomica. After 1945 there was one more change in the character of the quarter - three industrial plants were built there: Electrical Machinery Factory Celma (near the Freedom Bridge), specialising in the production of motors, a Paints and Varnishes Factory (the middle part of Przykopa quarter) and the Juwenia facility (located next to the Friendship Bridge), based on the company of the Kohn family.

== Art at the Venice of Cieszyn ==
On 4 June 2009 at the Venice of Cieszyn a theatre performance entitled The Carnival of Venice took place. The performance was put on by actors of Teatr Gry and Ludzie from Katowice as a part of the “Alternative off-stage” that operated simultaneously with the 20th edition of the International Theatre Festival “Without Borders”.

On 26 April 2012 on the Venice of Cieszyn a biennale took place organized by the Foundation of Social and Cultural Animation operating at the University of Silesia in Cieszyn.

== Legends and tales ==
Folk tales have it that Młynówka and the nearby Olza River were inhabited by utopce (drowners), which are perceived either as ghosts in charge of rivers, ponds and streams or drowned men. One of the tales entitled O utopcu (About a drowner) takes place on Przedmieście Przykopa.

== Trivia ==
There is a possibility of a virtual sightseeing of the Venice of Cieszyn.
