= Venetian House (Sighișoara) =

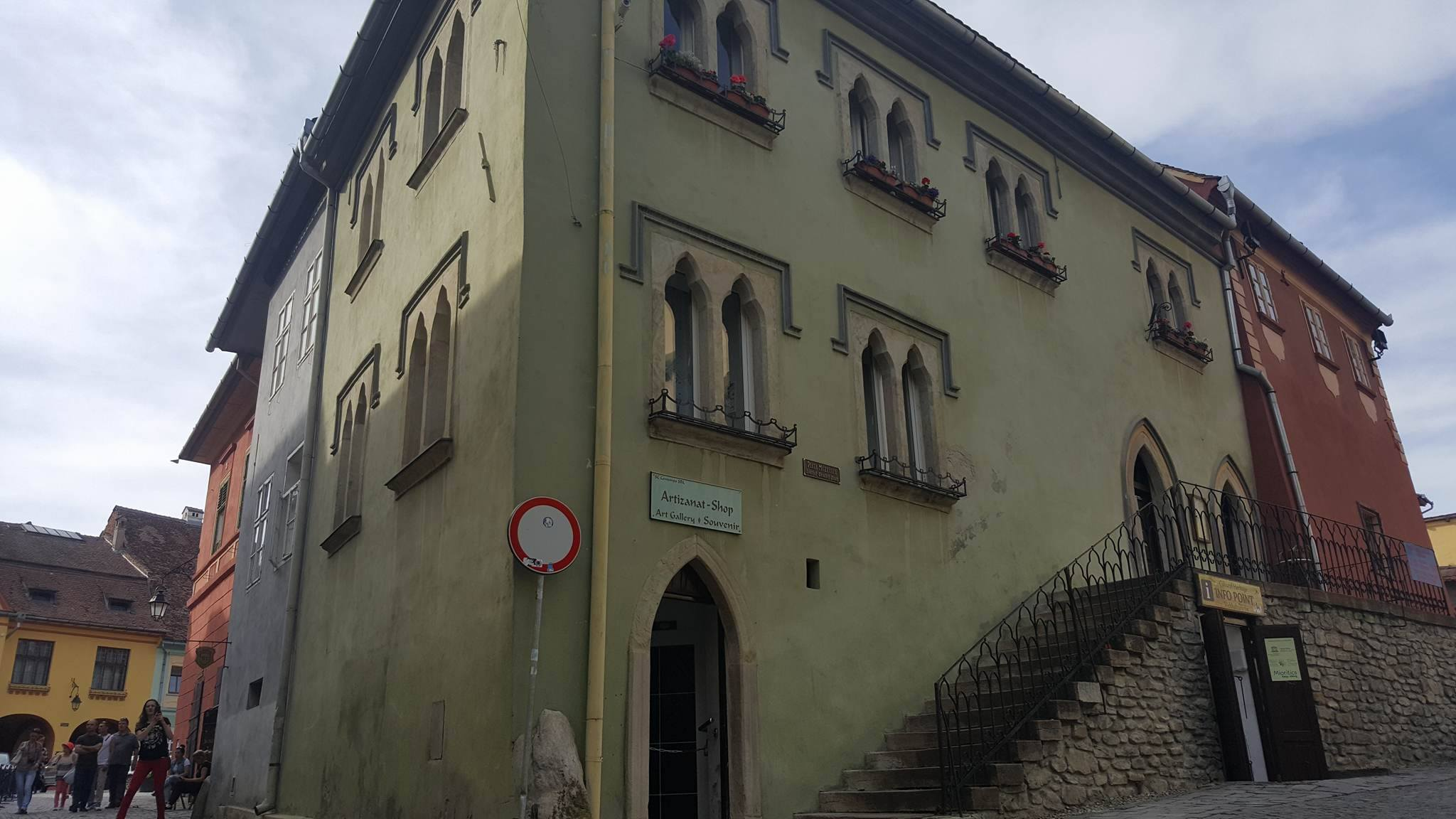
Venetian House

The Venetian House of Sighişoara (Casa Venețiană in Romanian) was so called because of its stones framing the windows, which imitates the Venetian style. It dates back to the 16th century. The legend says that the Mayor of Sighișoara fell in love with a Venetian woman whom he took in Sighișoara. They were happy but she missed her hometown so much that the mayor decided to bring her to Sighișoara by rebuilding the house and giving it a Venetian style.
