= Venecia, Bogotá =

Venecia
- Barrio
- Country: Colombia
- Department: Distrito Capital
- City: Bogotá

Venecia is a neighbourhood (barrio) of Bogotá, Colombia.
