= Ciudad Tunal =

- Barrio
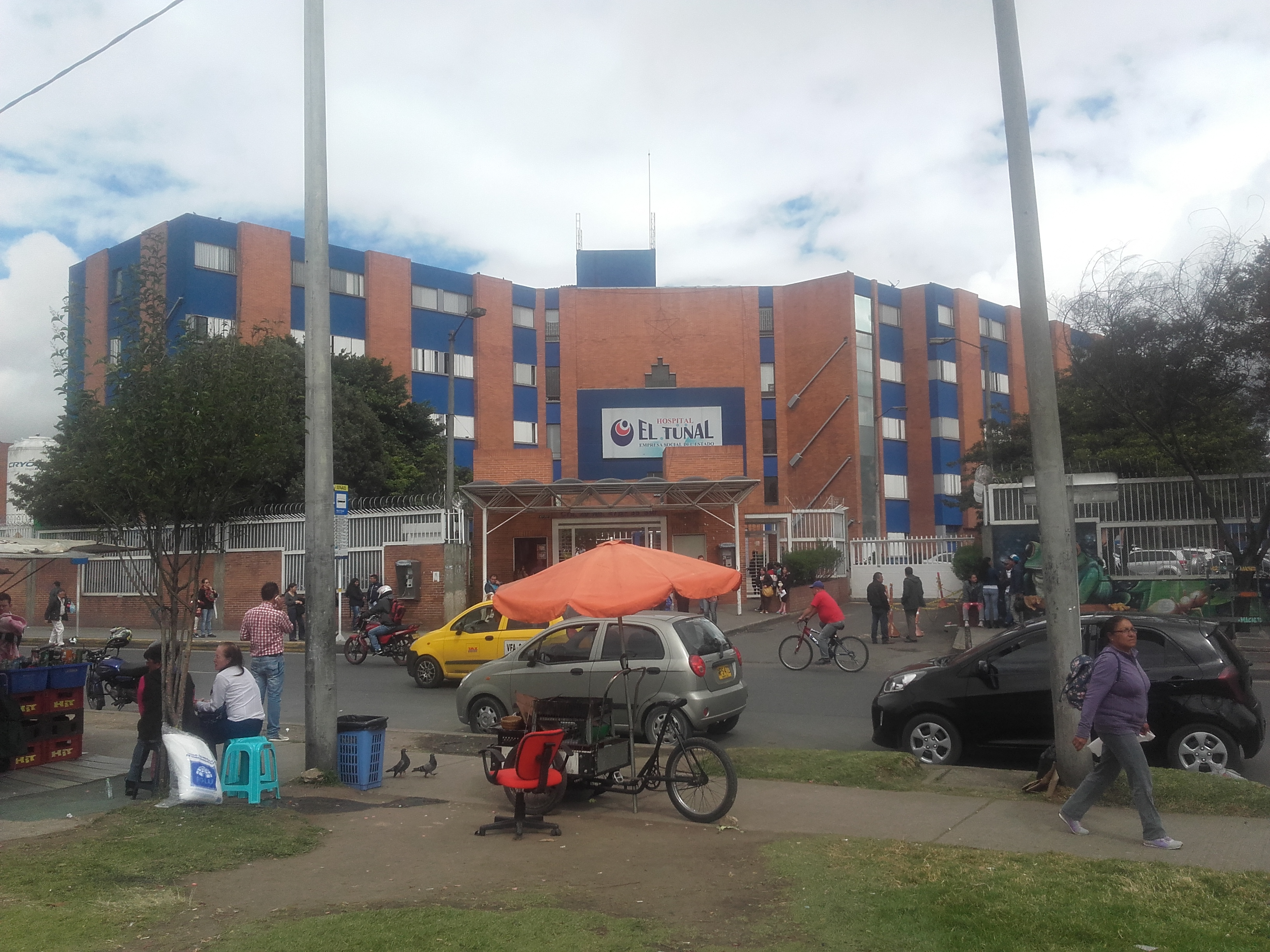
- El Tunal Hospital
- Etymology: Muysccubun: cacique Tuna
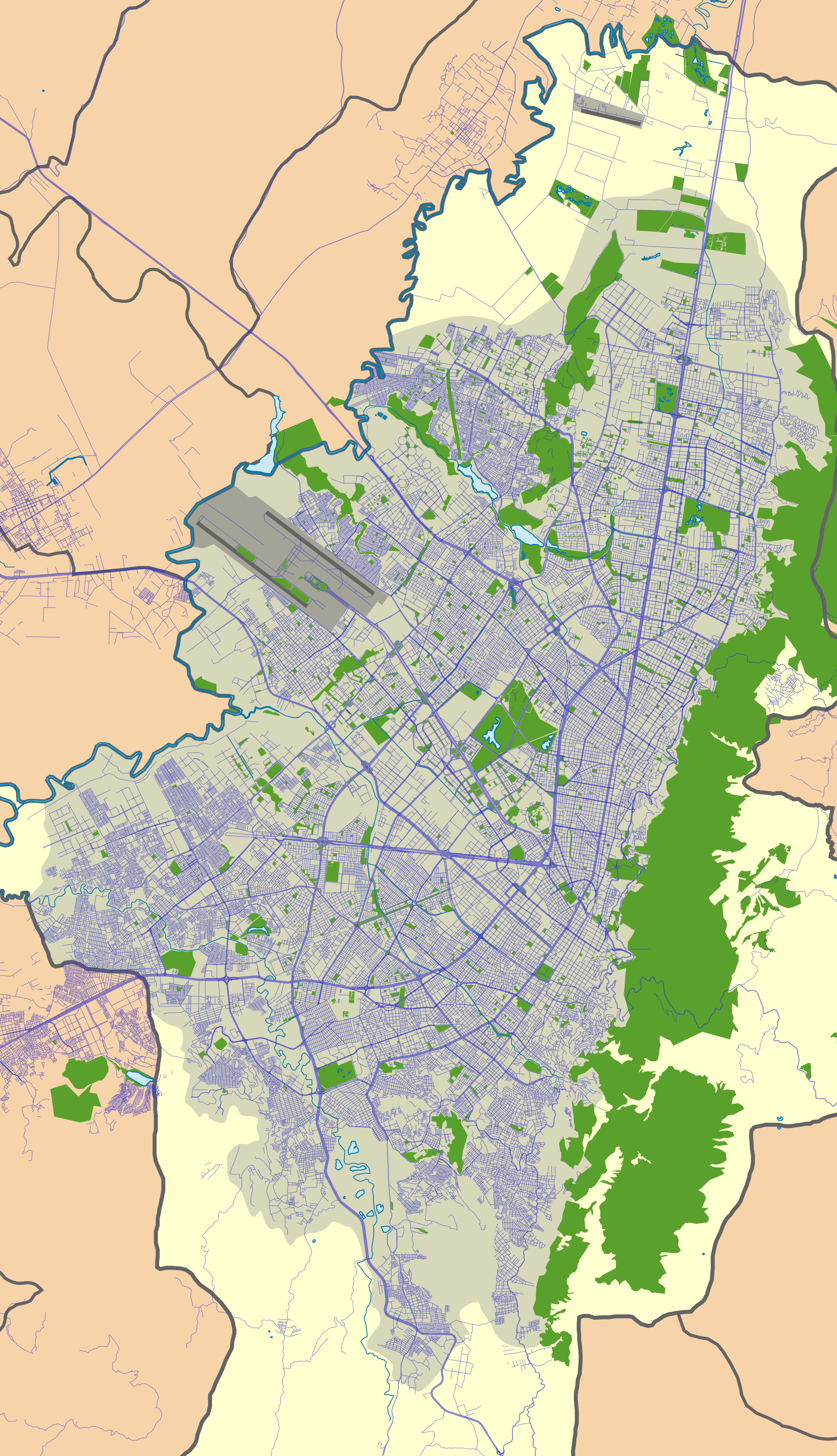
- Location in Bogotá
- Coordinates: 4°34′19″N 74°08′02″W
- Country: Colombia
- Department: Distrito Capital
- City: Bogotá
- Locality: Tunjuelito
- Formalised: 29 May 1992
- Elevation: 2,556 m (8,386 ft)

Ciudad Tunal is a neighbourhood (barrio) of the locality Tunjuelito in Bogotá, Colombia.

== Etymology ==
The name Tunal is derived from a cacique of the Muisca, Tuna.
