= Giulian =

Giulian is a male given name. Notable people with the name include:

- Giulian Biancone (born 2000), French footballer
- Giulian Ilie (born 1977), Romanian boxer
- Giulian Pedone (born 1993), Swiss motorcycle racer

== See also ==
- Sasha DiGiulian (born 1992), American professional rock climber
