= Portrait of Giacomo di Andrea Dolfin =

Painting by Titian

Portrait of Giacomo Dolfin
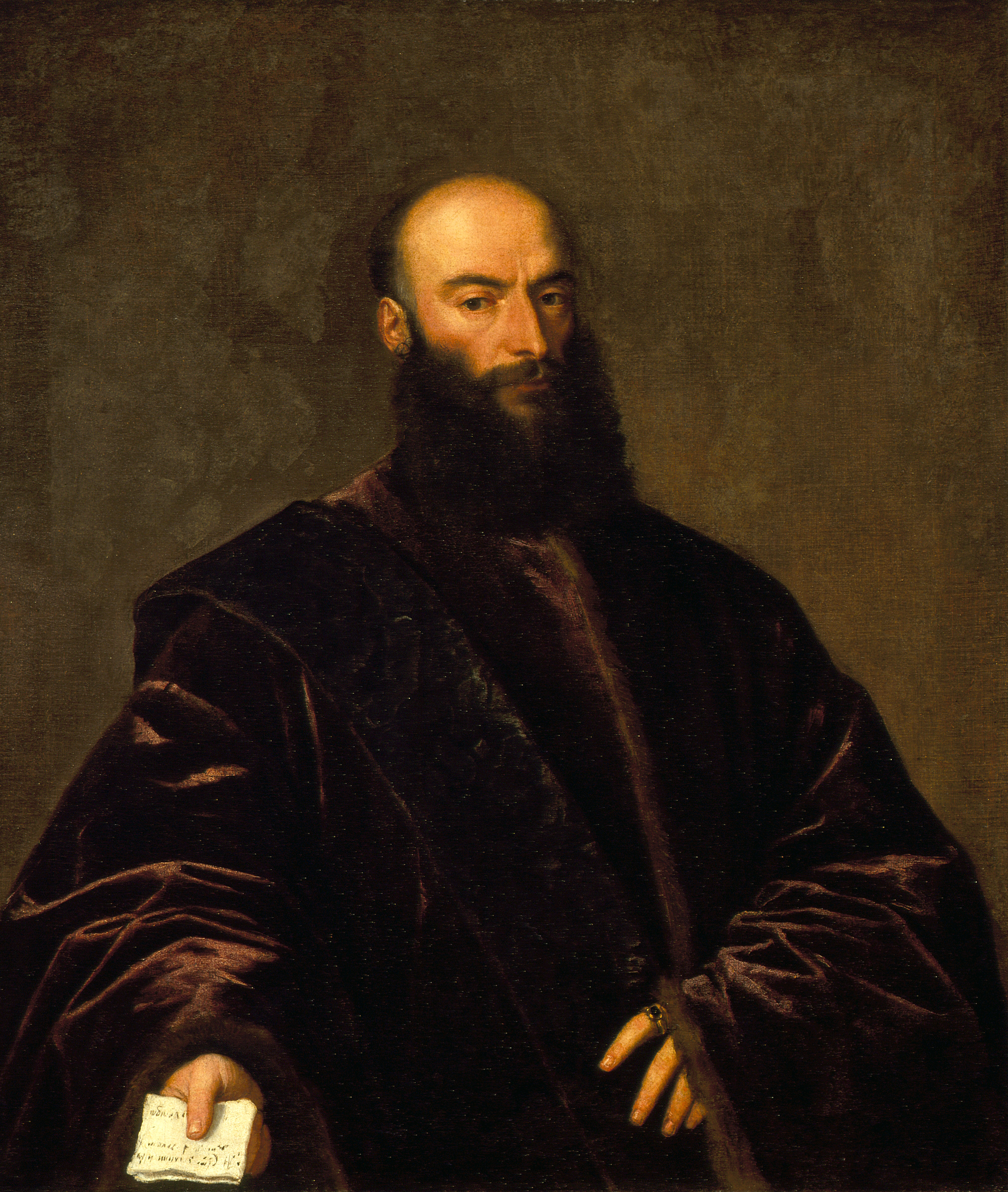
- Artist: Titian
- Year: c. 1531–1532
- Medium: Oil on canvas
- Dimensions: 104.9 cm × 90.9 cm (41.3 in × 35.8 in)
- Location: Los Angeles County Museum of Art; Los Angeles

Portrait of Giacomo di Andrea Dolfin, formerly known only as Portrait of a Man, is an oil painting by the Venetian master Titian, made about 1531. It is part of the collection of the Los Angeles County Museum of Art, though not currently on display.

== Subject ==
The sitter was identified as Giacomo di Andrea Dolfin by Charles Hope in 1982, based on the partially legible inscription on the letter held in the subject's right hand, which is addressed to himself. Philip Conisbee, in 1991, gave the following decipherment: "Al Cl … mo Giacomo delfin / M ... co D ... Prvi / a Vrcinovi [or Venezia]". Dolfin is probably being referred to as provveditore at Orzinuovi, which position he is known to have occupied in 1531 and 1532. Titian shows him garbed in the costly burgundy robes of a Venetian magistrate.

== History ==
- Probably seen by Vasari in the house of Danese Cattaneo during his stay in Venice in 1566, described thus: un ritratto di man di Tiziano, d'un gentiluomo da ca' Delfini ("a portrait by the hand of Tiziano of a gentleman of the Delfini family").
- In the collection of Antonio Canova, mentioned in the inventory after his death in 1822.
- Gifted by The Ahmanson Foundation (M.81.24) to the Los Angeles County Museum of Art.

== Copy ==
Venetian Nobleman
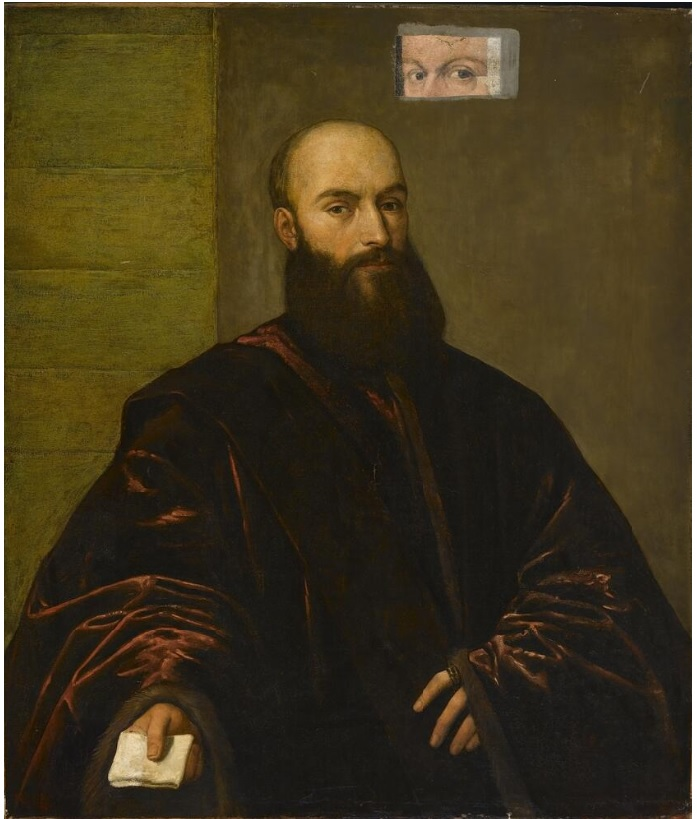
- Artist: Titian
- Year: after 1530
- Medium: Oil on canvas
- Dimensions: 108.0 cm × 91.4 cm (42.5 in × 36.0 in)
- Location: Norton Simon Museum; Pasadena
- Accession: F.1965.1.065.P

There is an old copy of the painting in the collection of the Norton Simon Museum, Pasadena, entitled Portrait of a Venetian Nobleman, which is thought to be either a studio version or a later copy by Titian himself. As revealed by x-ray analysis, the copy was painted over another fully finished and cut-down portrait of a bearded, seated figure which was probably by another hand (perhaps Leandro Bassano).

The painting was acquired by Joseph Duveen in 1928 and published in a German catalogue by Wilhelm Suida in 1939. It includes a type of cloth hanging or unfolded curtain behind the figure of Dolfin. The same type of cloth hanging was once in the original portrait but proved to be a later addition and was removed during a conservation effort in 1980.

=== Provenance ===
- Leo Blumenreich, Berlin; sold October 1928 to:
- Duveen Brothers, London and New York; sold 1965 to:
- The Norton Simon Foundation.

== Gallery ==
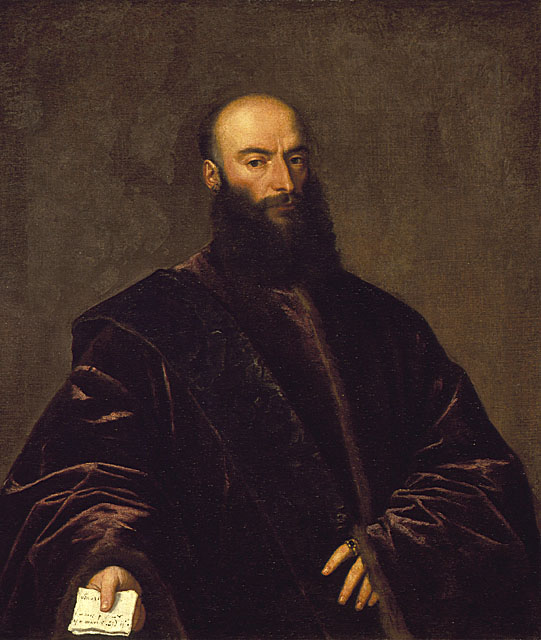
Portrait of Giacomo Dolfin (c. 1531)

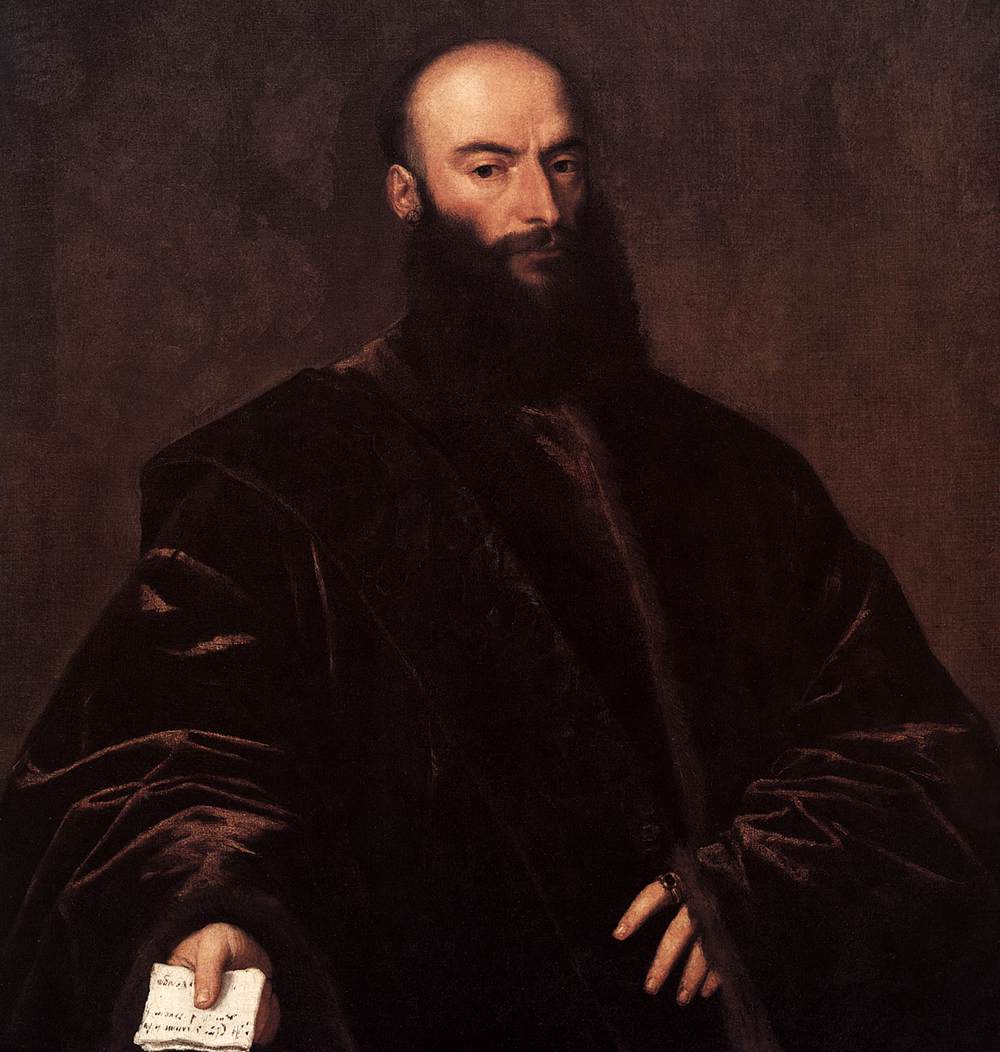
Portrait of Giacomo Dolfin (c. 1531; detail)

== See also ==
- List of works by Titian

== Sources ==
- Hope, Charles (March 1982). "Titian's 'Portrait of Giacomo Dolfin'". Apollo, 115(241): pp. 158–161.
- Marandel, J. Patrice (2019). Gifts of European Art From The Ahmanson Foundation. Vol. 1: Italian Painting and Sculpture. Los Angeles: Los Angeles County Museum of Art. pp. 43, 134, 157.
- Vasari, Giorgio (1915). Lives of the Most Eminent Painters, Sculptors & Architects. (Translated from the Italian by Gaston du C. De Vere). Vol. 9. London: Macmillan and Co Ld. & The Medici Society, Ld.
- Suida, Wilhelm (1939). Tizian. Zürich. Plate CXCV.
- "Portrait of Giacomo di Andrea Dolfin". LACMA Collections. Retrieved 29 August 2022.
- "Venetian Nobleman". Norton Simon Museum. Retrieved 29 August 2022.
