= Venice (video game) =

2007 video game

- Developer(s): Retro64
- Publisher(s): PopCap Games
- Platform(s): Windows
- Release: June 22, 2007
- Genre(s): Puzzle
- Mode(s): Single-player

Venice is a Microsoft Windows-based action puzzle game set in an abstract representation of Venice, Italy developed by both Retro64 Games and PopCap Games, and published by the latter. The game was released on June 22, 2007.

== Gameplay ==
The basic gameplay consists of a gondola controlled by the player that shoots various treasures (Keys, Hearts, Coins, Rings, Vases, Stars and Lyres) directly upward towards plates that have matching slots on the side of a building in an attempt to match the treasure with its matching slot. Plates come in varied shapes such as bars, circles, half-circles, T-shapes, and X-shapes. They may hold as few as one and as many as eight treasure slots, and they may not be stationary. Some feature hinges that cause them to rotate when hit, while others shift or rotate positions when hit. The player usually has the ability to cycle between two treasures before firing.

If a player manages to hit a high matching slot, the treasure will usually tumble and fill one or more lower slots for a combo bonus; each successive tumble increases the bonus and the chance of a power-up popping up. Bank shots earn extra points; when a treasure makes an inordinate amount of banks shots before filling a slot, the player is given a "Lucky shot" bonus. Once a grouping of slots are filled, that grouping vanishes and awards the player more points.

A fired treasure can be diverted by obstacles that include bumpers (stone walls or ledges off of which treasures will bounce), locks and blocks (barriers that require a specific treasure to unlock), bricks (obstacles that crumble when hit), chutes (cylinders that redirect any treasure fired into them), shelves (special plates that hold a number of treasures), teleports (swirly objects that warp treasures from point to point) and baskets (objects that catch treasures and then drop them). If a player misfires, the treasure will either shatter after a long period of bouncing around the screen, or it will plunge into the water, costing the player one of three lives for that level. The player may prevent this by catching the treasure before it plunges.

After each section of a building is completed, the water level rises to introduce a new part of the building, until all the sections are completed to finish the level.

When a level is completed, the player receives scoring for accuracy, speed of completion, number of combos scored, and how many tries the player took to complete a level.

== Game modes ==
The game includes four game modes, three of which must be unlocked:

- Journey: Basic gameplay
- Flood: An action mode in which the river level rises at a steady rate. Icons that splash in the water no longer cost the player, but sections must be completed before the water level engulfs them or the level is failed.
- Survival: Like Flood mode, but a single building that never ends.
- Trick shots: Nothing but trick shots. The player is given a reward of 1,000 points for a successful trick shot, incrementing 1,000 points with each successful trick shot, and resetting to 1,000 after a failure.

There are 72 total buildings (levels) in the game among 8 neighborhoods. As with most PopCap games, Venice features online leaderboards.
