= Venetian School =

Venetian School may refer to:

- Venetian painting, painting in Venice from the 14th to 18th century
- Venetian School (music), the body and work of composers working in Venice from c. 1550 to c. 1610
- Venetian Gothic architecture
- Venetian Renaissance architecture

== See also ==
- Venetian (disambiguation)
