= Venitian =

Venitian or Venitan may refer to:

- anything of or relating to Venice
- the Venetian language

== See also ==
- Venetian (disambiguation)
