= Venetia =

Venetia may refer to:

== Places ==
- Veneto or Venetia, a modern Italian region
- Adriatic Venetia (tribal region), an ancient tribal region of Adriatic Veneti
- Venetia et Histria, an administrative region of ancient Roman Italy
- Byzantine Venetia, a Byzantine province in the 6th and 7th centuries
- Kingdom of Lombardy–Venetia (1815–1866), a crown land of the Austrian Empire
- Veneția, a tributary of the Olt River in Romania
- Venetia, Pennsylvania, United States, an unincorporated community
- 487 Venetia, an asteroid

== Arts and entertainment ==
- Venetia (Disraeli novel), an 1837 novel by Benjamin Disraeli
- Venetia (Heyer novel), a 1958 novel by Georgette Heyer
- "Venetia", a song from the album Eternal Atake by Lil Uzi Vert

== Other uses ==
- Venetia (given name), a list of people and fictional characters
- HMS Venetia, a British Royal Navy destroyer launched in 1917 and sunk in 1940
- USS Venetia, a steam yacht leased by the U.S. during World War I
- Venetia Diamond Mine, South Africa's largest producer of diamonds

== See also ==
- Veneția de Jos and Veneția de Sus, villages in Părău Commune, Brașov County, Romania
- Venice (disambiguation)
- Veneti (disambiguation)
- Venetian (disambiguation)
