= Venetian Gothic architecture =

Architectural style of Medieval Venice

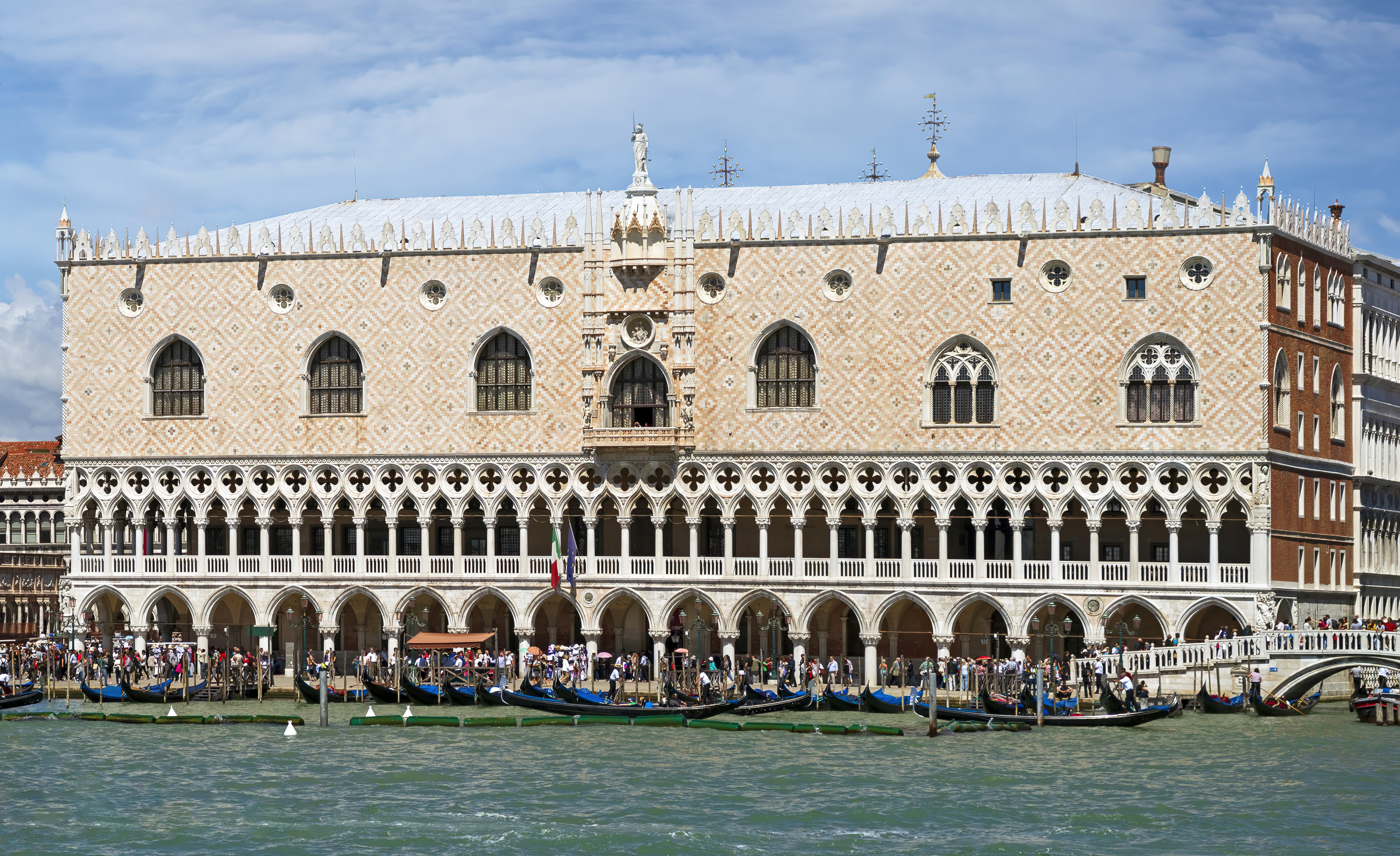
Gothic arches on the Doge's Palace, Venice. Mostly 14th century.

Venetian Gothic is the particular form of Italian Gothic architecture typical of Venice, originating in local building requirements, with some influence from Byzantine architecture, and some from Islamic architecture, reflecting Venice's trading network. Very unusually for medieval architecture, the style is at its most characteristic in secular buildings, with the great majority of surviving examples of the style being secular.

The best-known examples are the Doge's Palace and the Ca' d'Oro. Both feature loggias of closely spaced small columns, with heavy tracery with quatrefoil openings above, decoration along the roofline, and some coloured patterning to plain wall surfaces. Together with the ogee arch, capped with a relief ornament, and ropework reliefs, these are the most iconic characteristics of the style. Ecclesiastical Gothic architecture tended to be less distinctively Venetian, and closer to that in the rest of Italy.

The beginning of the style probably goes back no further than the 13th century, although the dates of early Gothic palaces, and especially features such as windows in them, are largely uncertain. It dominated the 14th century and because of the city's conservatism Venetian Gothic buildings, especially smaller palaces, continued to be built well into the second half of the 15th century, and Venetian Renaissance architecture very often retained reminiscences of its Gothic predecessor.

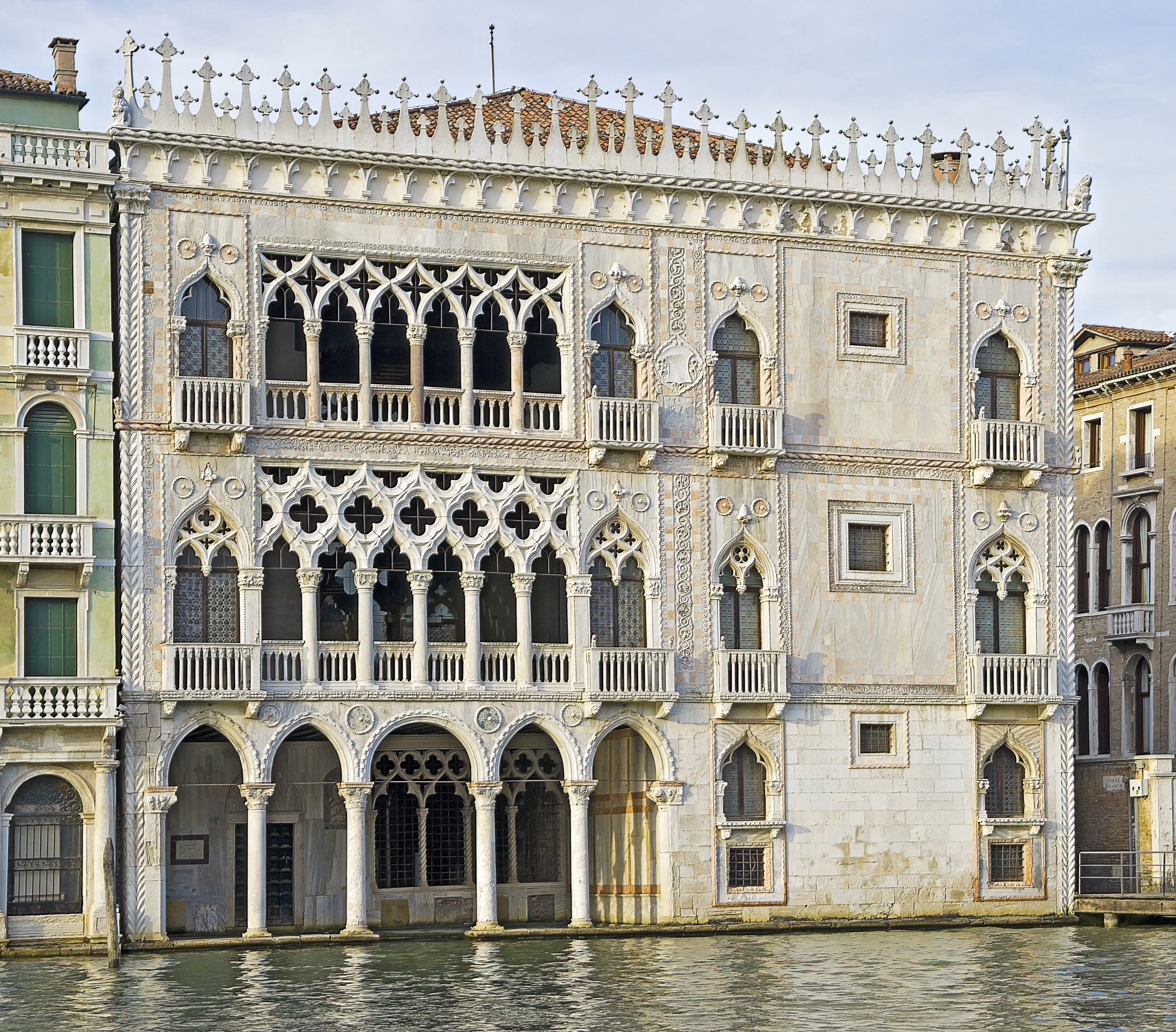
Ca' d'Oro on the Grand Canal, 1428–1430

In the 19th century, inspired in particular by the writings of John Ruskin, there was a revival of the style, part of the broader Gothic Revival movement in Victorian architecture. Even in the Middle Ages, Venetian palaces were built on very constricted sites, and were tall rectangular boxes with decoration concentrated on the front facade. The style was therefore developed for a similar architectural context to that found in late 19th-century city centre streets.

== Context ==
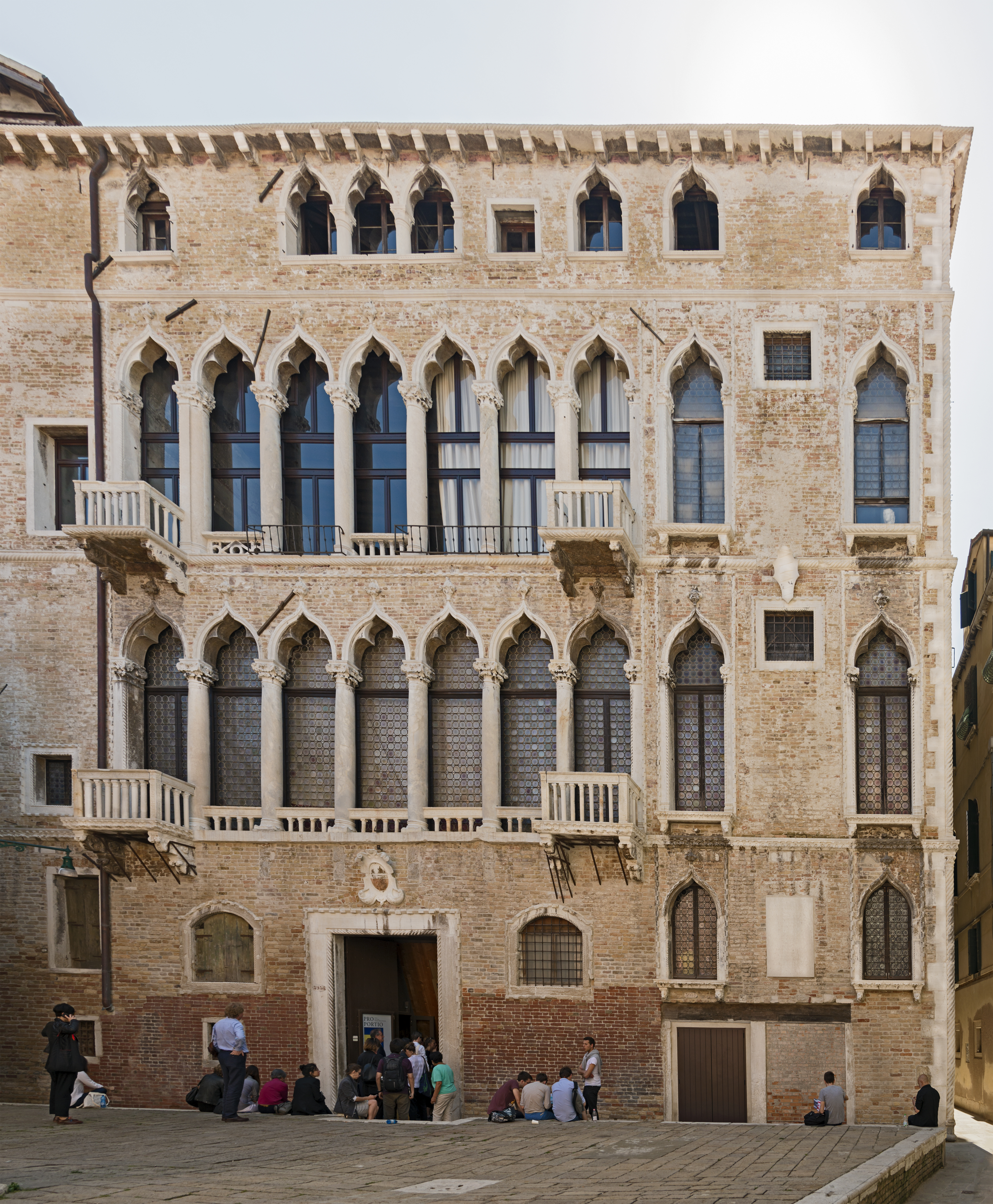
Palazzo Pesaro Orfei, 15th century

Venice is built on alluvial mud, and all buildings in the city were (and mostly still are) supported by large numbers of timber piles driven into the mud. Above that the normal building material is brick, although the grander facades were usually faced with Istrian stone, a fine limestone that is not strictly a marble, although it is often so called. This came by sea from quarries in Istria in the Terraferma, now in Croatia. Other stones with different colours were often used for contrast, especially a red stone from Verona. Marmorino stucco, made from grinding limestone, brick and terracotta fragments, was the typical finish for interior walls, and sometimes exteriors. Flat ceilings supported with timber beams were preferred to vaults, which might crack as the building settled on the pile foundations.

The main city was already very largely built up, with buildings tightly packed in the centre; this is shown clearly by Jacopo de' Barbari's huge woodcut View of Venice with an elevated view of the city in 1500. Because buildings were tightly packed, Venice was even more prone than other Italian city centres to fires, creating the need for many of the new buildings.

== Palaces ==
Unlike the palaces or houses of wealthy families in other Italian cities, defence was not a major concern for Venetian palaces, which in any cases often had "moats" on some sides. The crowded city centre encouraged building high by the standards of the period, and the main access for light was often from the front facade, which therefore typically has more and larger windows than palaces elsewhere.

Most palaces doubled as places of business, on the ground floor, and homes above. The ground floors, which even when built were probably rather prone to periodic flooding, have relatively few rooms, and a rather grand stairway leading to the residential upper floors, where ceilings are rather low by the standards of palaces. The portico on a canal allowed goods to be loaded and unloaded, and led to a large space called the androne, where they were stored and business transacted. Upstairs, the portego or salone was another large room, centrally placed and usually T-shaped, received light from the windows and was the main space for dining and entertaining. To the rear an open staircase led to a small courtyard with a well-head and often a rear door to the street. In fact there are no true wells in Venice, and the well-head led down to a cistern sealed from the salty groundwater, which collected rainwater from the roof and courtyard through stone gutters leading to a sand filter system and the cistern.

By the 13th century porticos at the front were often abandoned, and replaced by one or more large doorways leading to the androne.

== History ==
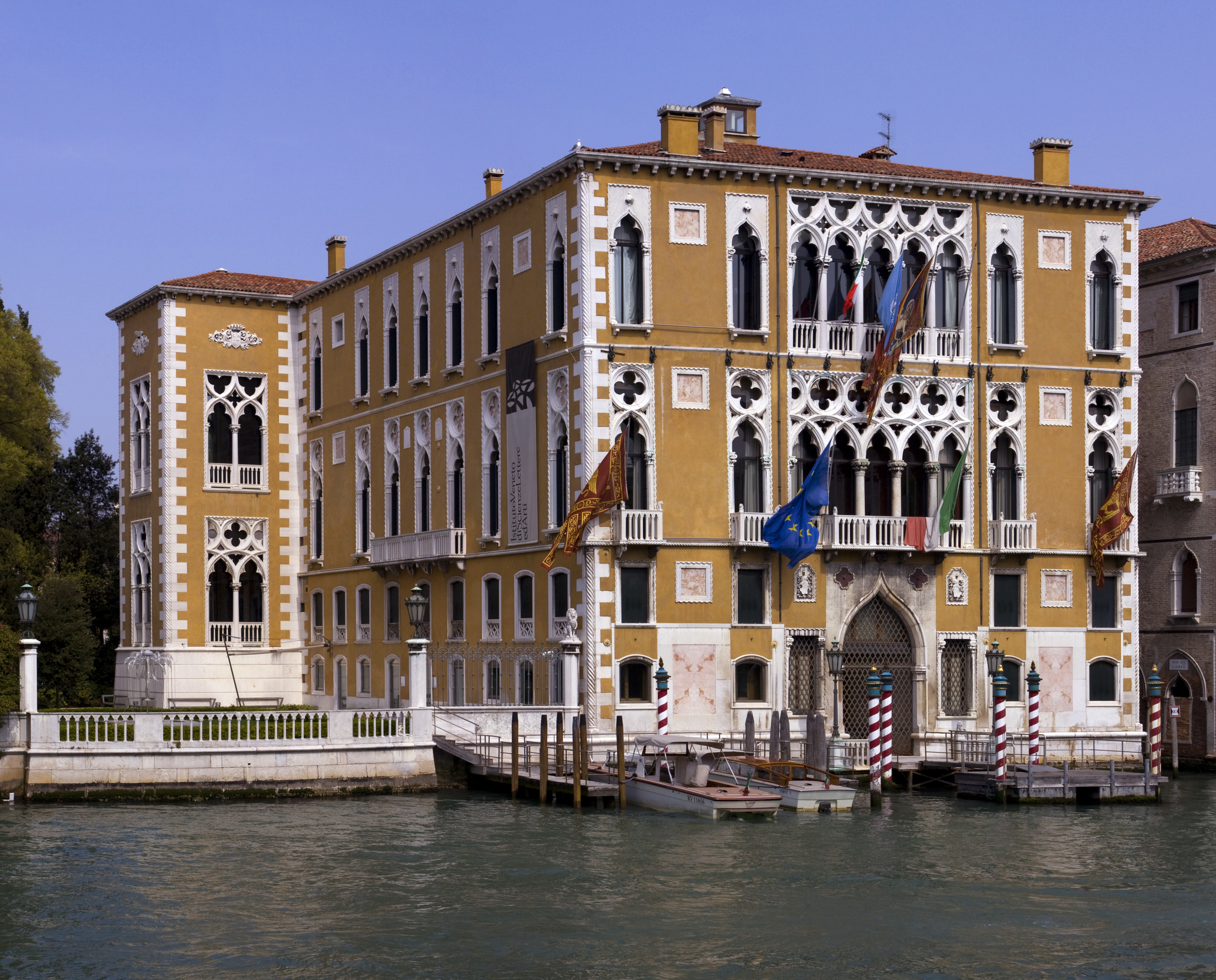
The Palazzo Cavalli-Franchetti on the Grand Canal; the 15th-century window style of the facade was extended to the sides in the 19th century.

The Gothic Period arrived in Venice during a time of great affluence, when the upper class was funding the building of new churches as well as new, opulent homes for themselves. At the same time, the religious orders were beginning to bring the Gothic style to Venice's churches from mainland Italy. The most striking examples of this new architectural fashion can be seen in Santi Giovanni e Paolo and the Frari. However, these churches were still very similar to those found in the rest of Italy, the main difference being the building materials. It was not until the increase in palace construction, that Venetian Gothic became a distinct style in itself. Influenced by the Doge's Palace, the creators of this new style meshed Gothic, Byzantine, and Oriental themes to produce a totally unique approach to architecture.

== Characteristics and examples ==
As described by Ruskin, the ogee arch was at the start of the stylistic development of the Venetian Gothic arch, rather than in the middle or at the end, as elsewhere. Round arches began to sprout points on their outer rim, while initially remaining circular on the inside. But neat progressions of style are not always reflected in actual buildings, and a variety of styles can sometimes be seen in a particular period, and in the same building.

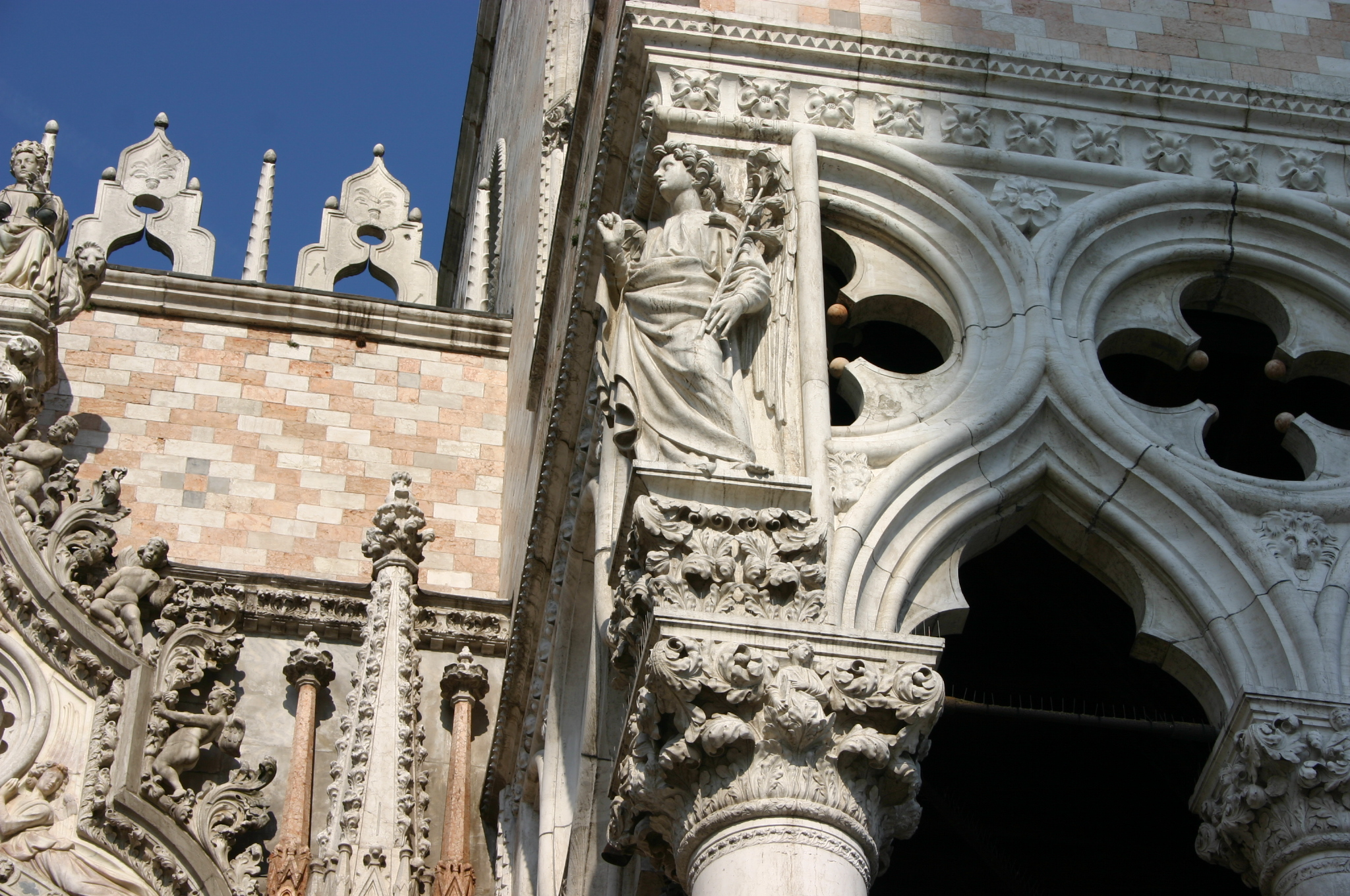
This exterior corner of the Doge's Palace shows the complicated mixture making up late Venetian "Gothic".

The ogee arch is "relatively uncommon in ecclesiastical buildings", where a more conventional Italian Gothic was adopted (and there are fewer survivals). Conversely, conventional Gothic arches are seen in palaces "only in the most solid elements". Because the unstable ground discouraged vaulting, the "structural raison d'etre of Gothic architecture – to allow the erection of higher and higher vaults, with more flexibility in ground-plan – was completely irrelevant in Venice".

In Northern Europe, traceries only supported stained glass. In contrast, traceries in Venetian Gothic supported the weight of the entire building. Therefore, the relative weight sustained by the traceries alludes to the relative weightlessness of the buildings as a whole. This (and the associated reduced use of weight-bearing walls) gives the Venetian Gothic architectural style lightness and grace in structure.

The Venetian Gothic, while far more intricate in style and design than previous construction types in Venice, never allowed more weight or size than necessary to support the building. Venice had always held the concern that every inch of land is valuable, because of the canals running through the city.

One major aspect of the Venetian Gothic style change that came about during the 14th and 15th centuries was the proportion of the central hall in secular buildings. This hall, known as the portego, evolved into a long passageway that was often opened by a loggia with Gothic arches. Architects favored using intricate traceries, similar to those found on the Doge's Palace. The most iconic Venetian Gothic structure, the Doge's Palace, is a luxuriously decorated building that includes traits of Gothic, Moorish, and Renaissance architectural styles. In the 14th century, following two fires that destroyed the previous structure, the palace was rebuilt in its present, recognizably Gothic form.

== Churches ==
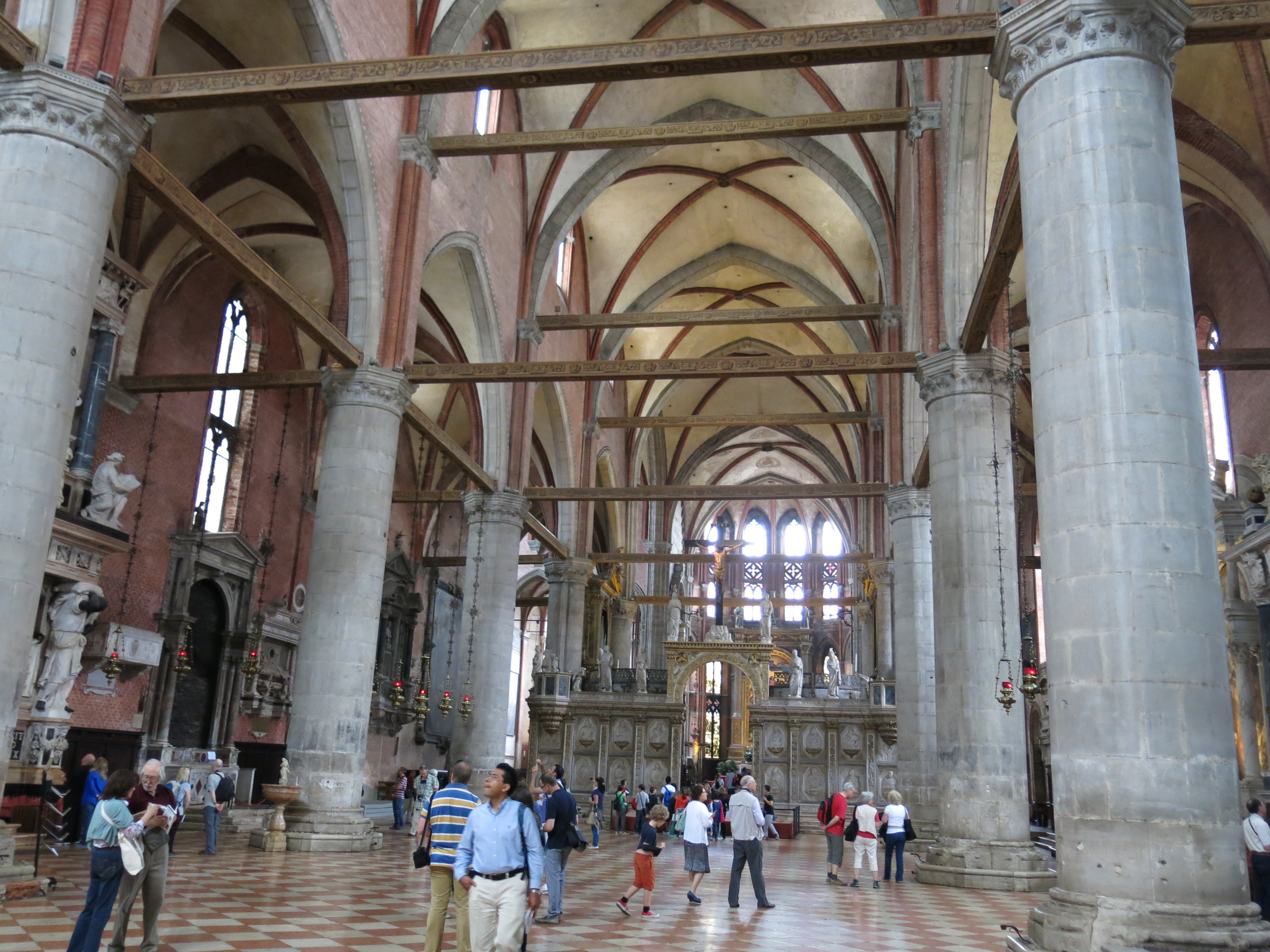
Inside the Frari

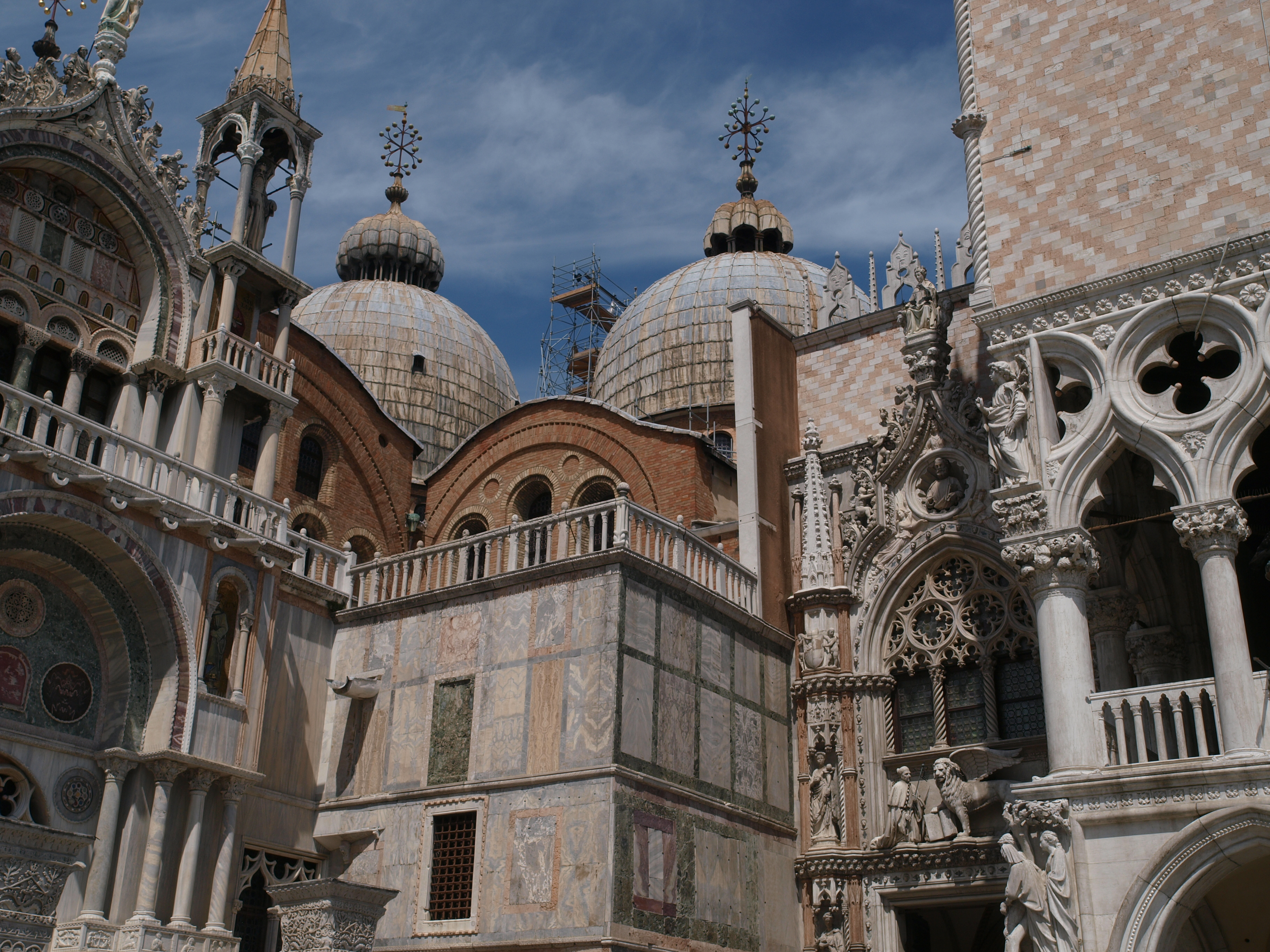
A wider view from the picture above, showing (on San Marco at left) the domes, fancy stone veneers, and at top left, two stone grilles.

The two largest Gothic churches to remain largely unaltered are those of the main mendicant orders; both are designed to provide large open spaces for star preachers to reach big congregations. These orders were controlled from the Italian mainland, and their original architecture mostly reflected broader Italian styles developed by each order elsewhere, and so represented a novelty in Venice. Both became home to numerous important wall tombs inside, which has probably prevented the interiors from having Baroque makeovers, as has happened elsewhere.

The Frari is the Franciscan church. Like most medieval Franciscan churches, this is a large plain building, built economically to hold large crowds to hear star preachers. First constructed in the 13th century, it was rebuilt in its current Gothic style over a long period in the 14th and 15th centuries.

The rival Dominican church of Santi Giovanni e Paolo is the other large Gothic church in the city that retains its original character. This was first begun in the 1240s, but that church was too small, and the current building was probably begun in 1333, although not consecrated until 1430. Many other churches retain significant Gothic work, especially Santo Stefano, a large parish church with a "ship's keel" wooden roof. The Madonna dell'Orto, built by the Humiliati order, is mostly 14th-century, but the facade, still Gothic, dates to the 1460s. Other Gothic churches have been given makeovers in Renaissance or Baroque styles. In San Marco, the main church of the republic, there is much Gothic sculpture on the facade, and other details, but the main elements of the structure remain Italo-Byzantine Romanesque.

== Islamic and Byzantine influence ==
The influence of Islamic architecture is reflected in some features of the Venetian style, in particular the use of colour and pattern on outside walls, and sometimes stone grills on windows, and perhaps purely decorative crenellations on rooflines. During the period the Venetian economy was heavily bound up with trade with both the Islamic world and the Byzantine Empire, and the architectural styles of these two are somewhat entangled, especially in the early Islamic period.

As an example, decorating walls with large veneers of fancy coloured marble or other stones, which was certainly a Venetian taste, was also found in Byzantine and Islamic architecture, but both had derived it from imperial Roman architecture. There are still examples in Ravenna (ruled by Venice from 1440 to 1509), Milan as well as Rome, and very likely much of the stripping of these from other surviving Roman buildings had not yet taken place.

Venetians may also have regarded some aspects of Byzantine and Islamic architecture as reflecting the world of Early Christianity – all over Italy "eastern" costume very often served for biblical figures in art, and the paintings of some Venetians, for example St Mark Preaching at Alexandria by Gentile Bellini (c. 1505) also use clearly Islamic architecture (including stone grills), although also reflecting the Byzantine styles of Constantinople, which Bellini visited in 1479, only some twenty-five years after it became the Ottoman capital. There were also Venetian connections with Islamic styles though Sicily and southern Italy, and possibly al-Andalus (Islamic Spain). Venetians probably saw the eastern elements in their architecture in a complex way, reflecting and celebrating both their history and the cause of their trade-derived wealth.

Venetian traders, and those of rival cities, reached into Persia and Central Asia in the Pax Mongolica after the Mongol conquests, from roughly 1240 to 1360. There were small Venetian colonies of merchants in Alexandria, as well as Constantinople. Venice's relations with the Byzantine Empire were still more intimate and complicated, involving many wars, treaties, and massacres.

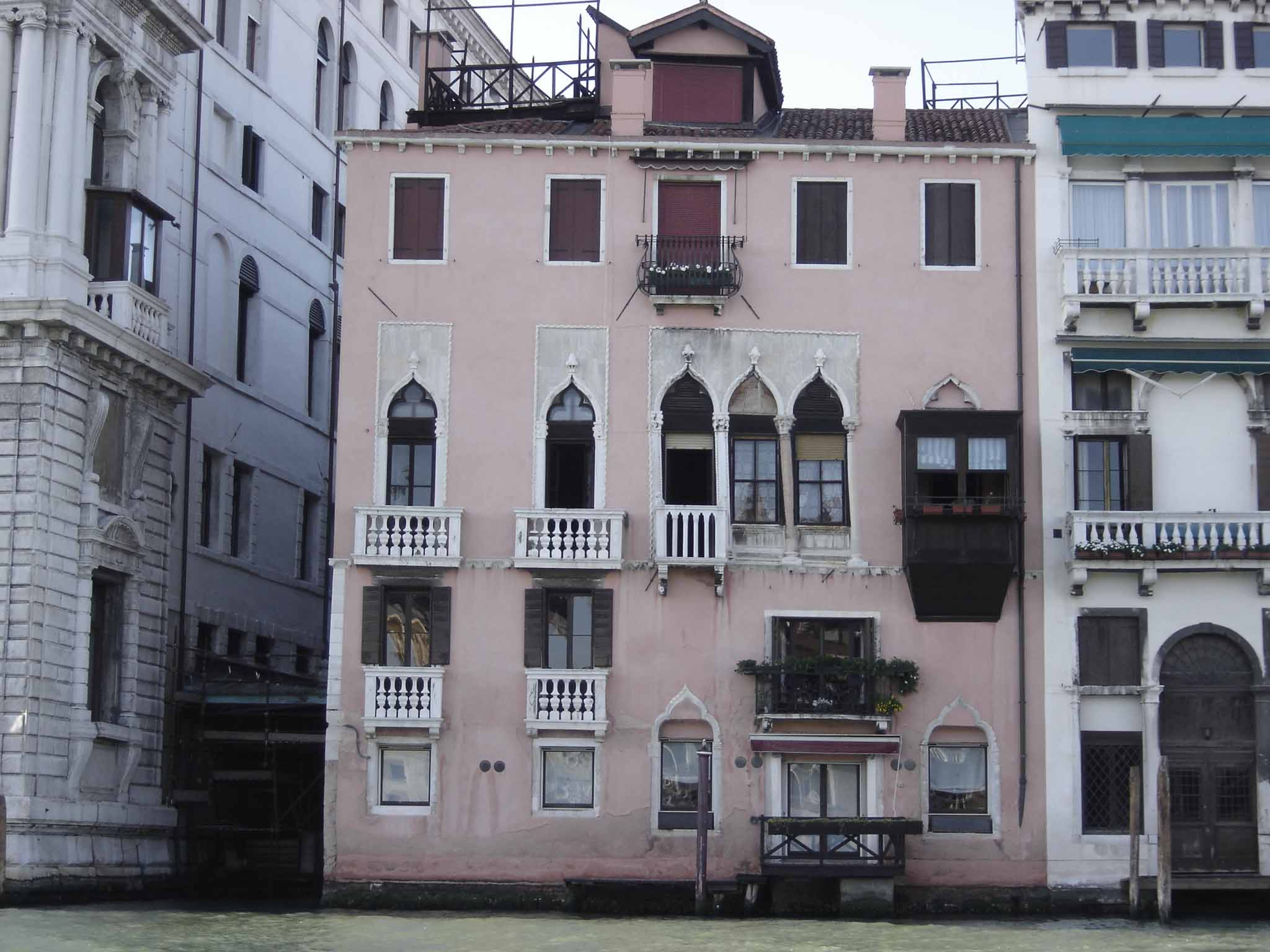
Palazzo Barbarigo Minotto

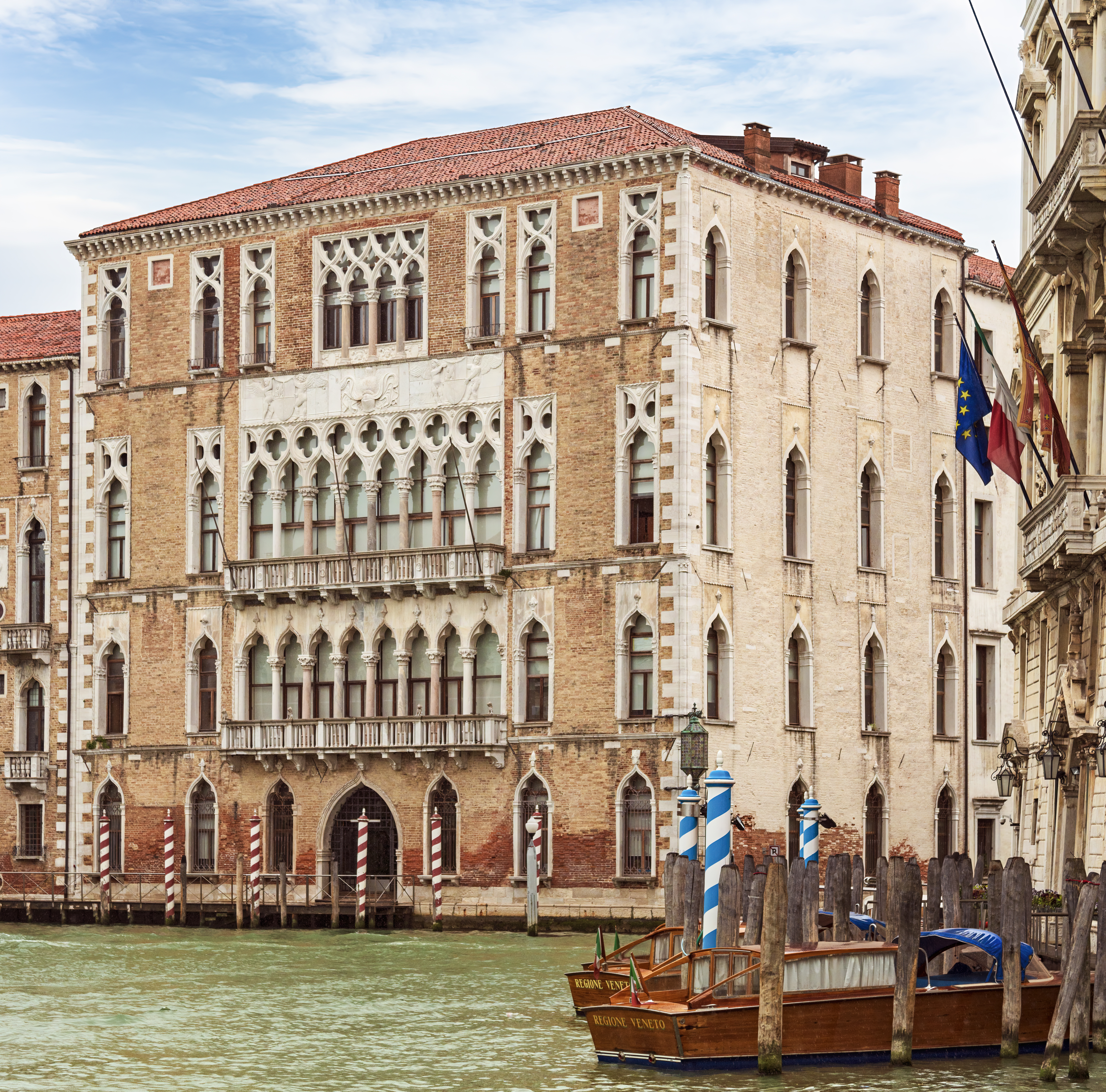
Ca' Foscari, built in late Venetian Gothic style

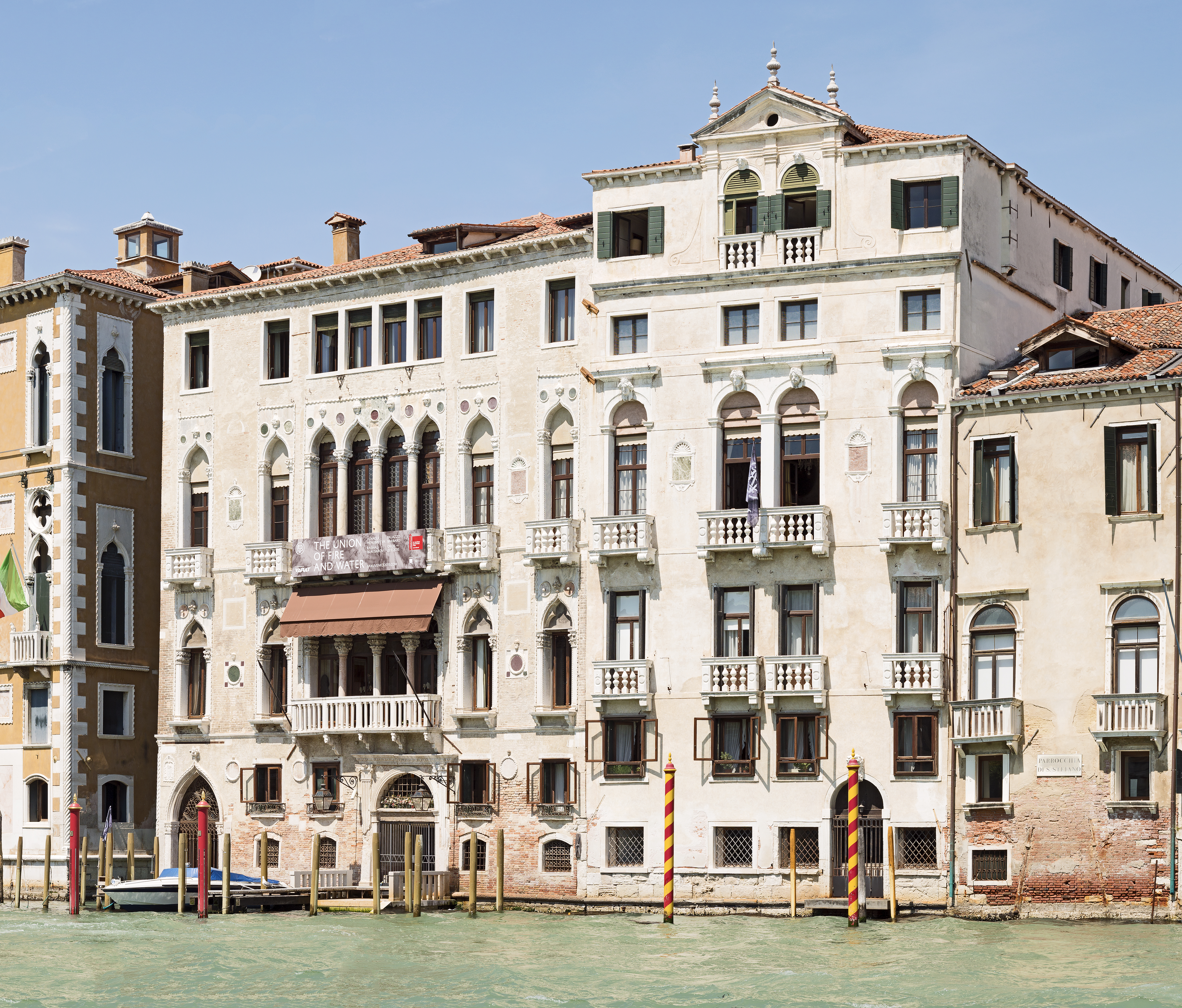
Ca' Barbaro on the Grand Canal

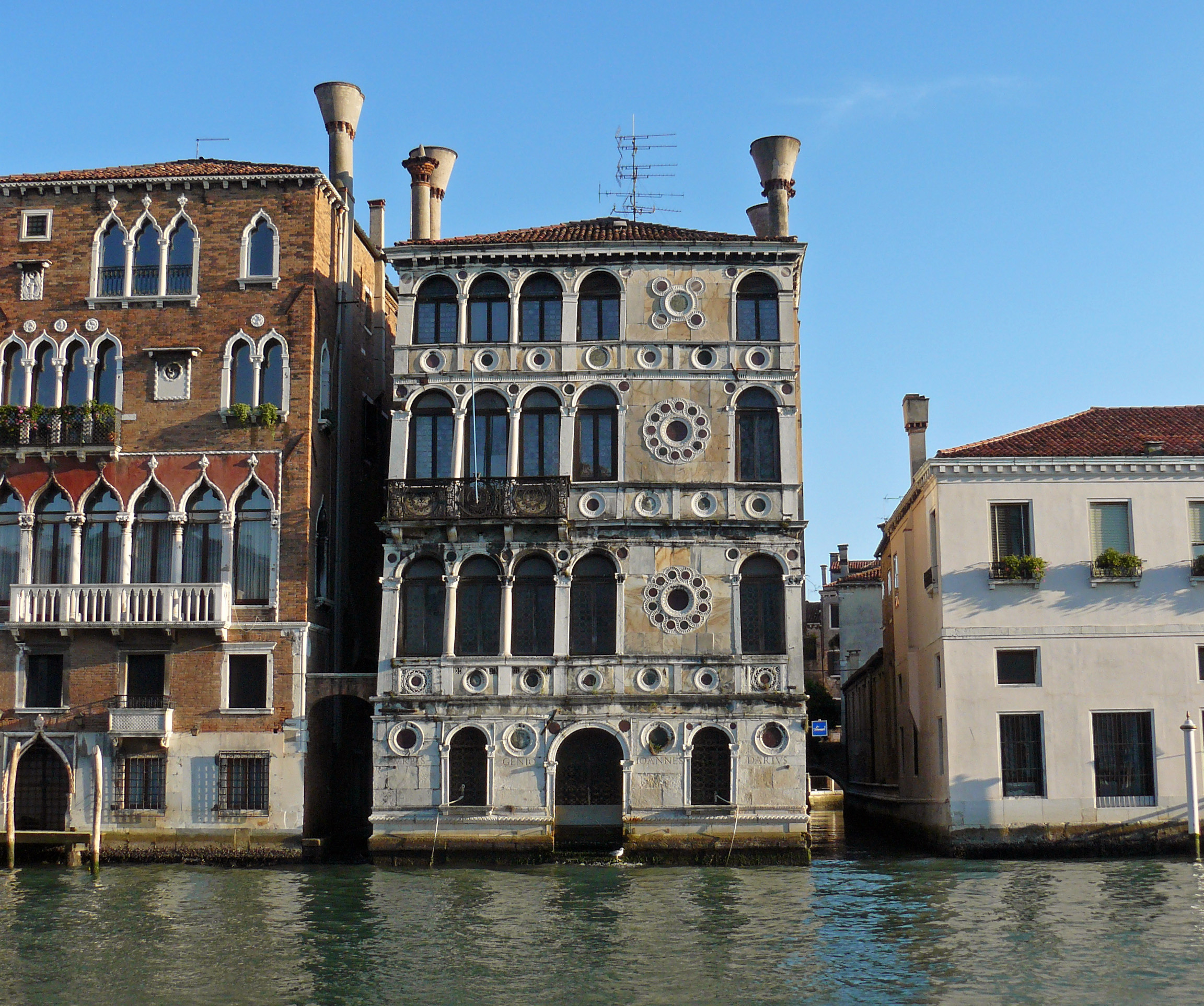
Palazzo Dario was later renovated with Renaissance features. On the left, Palazzo Barbaro Wolkoff.

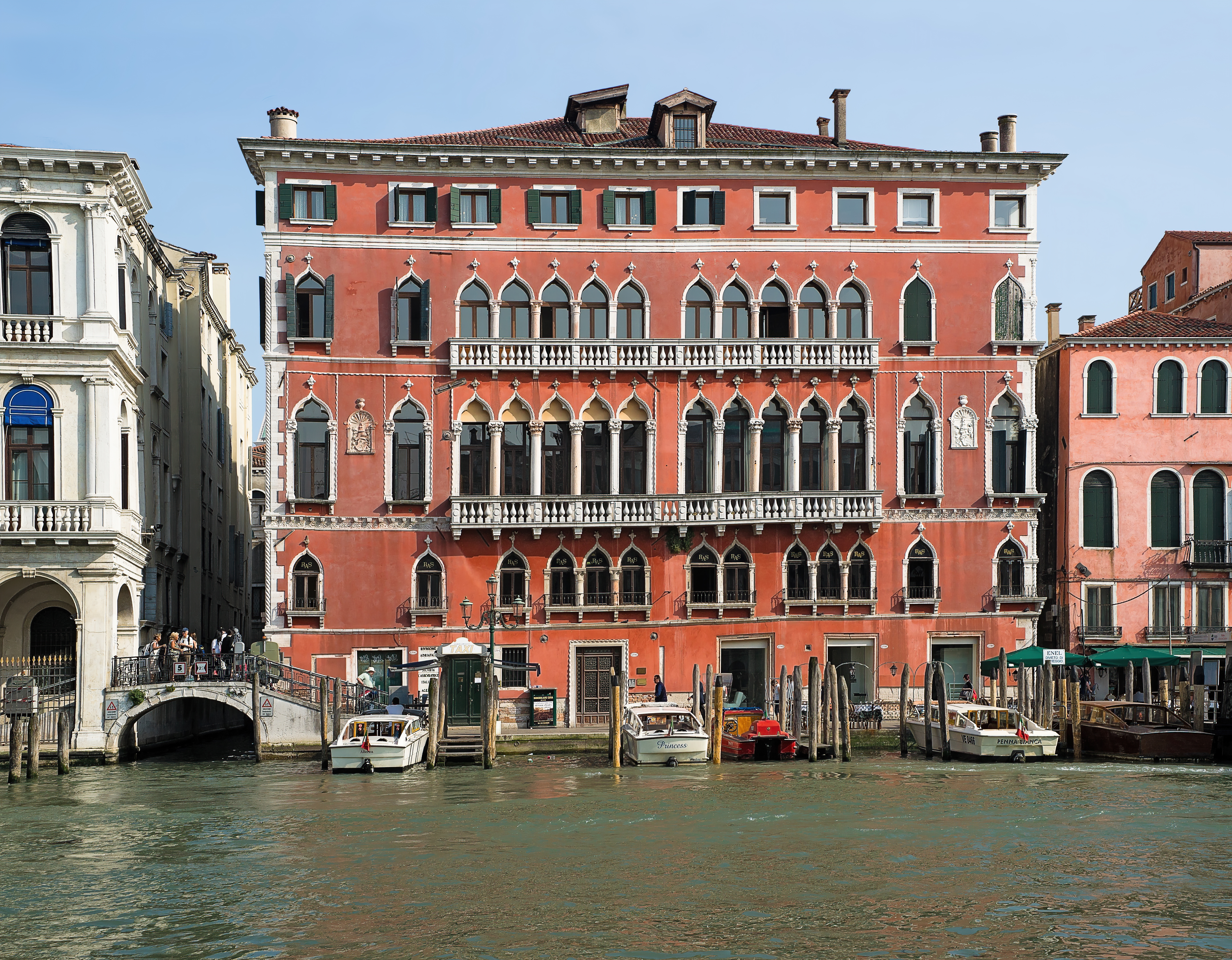
Palazzo Bembo on the Grand Canal, close to the Rialto Bridge

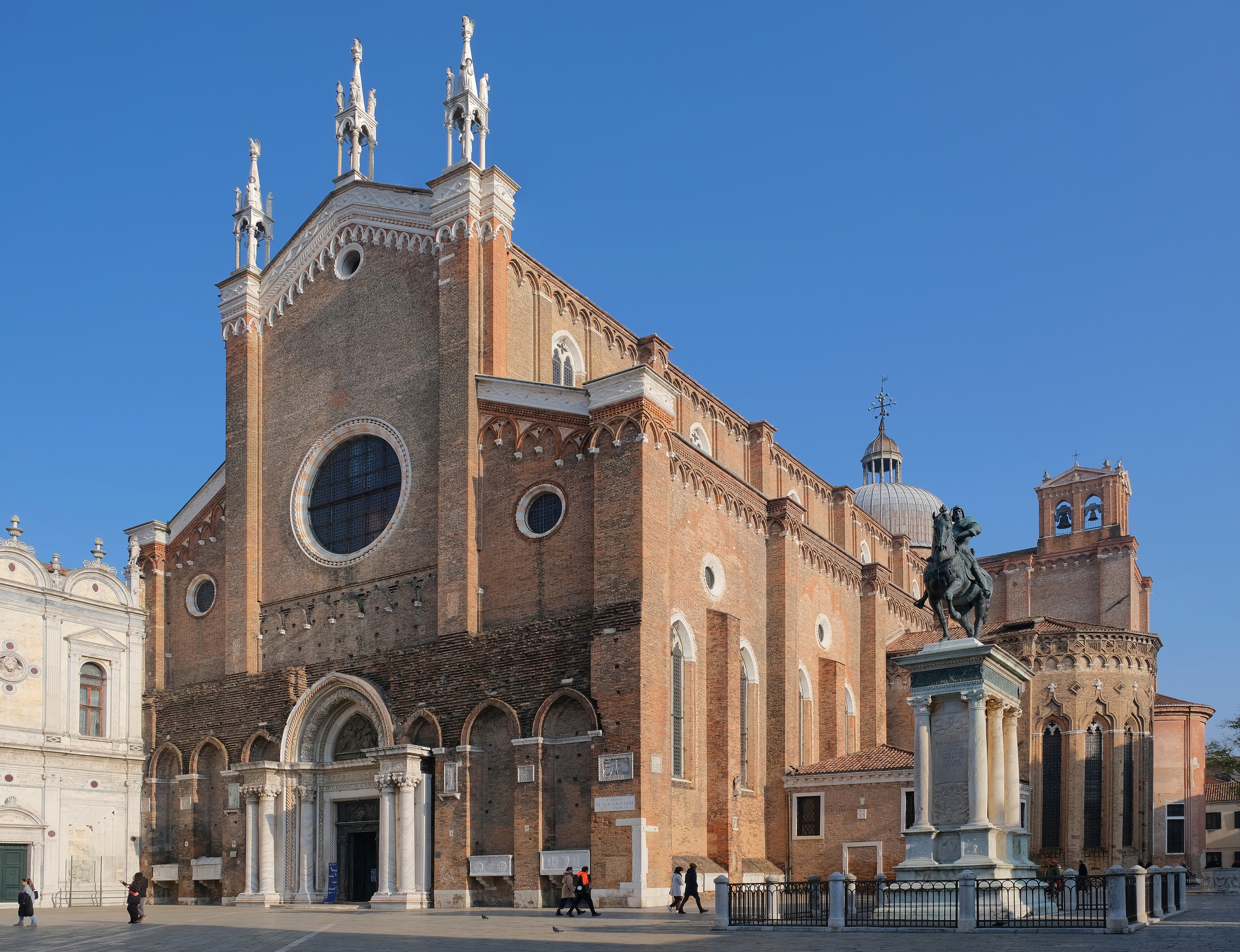
Santi Giovanni e Paolo, 1340s

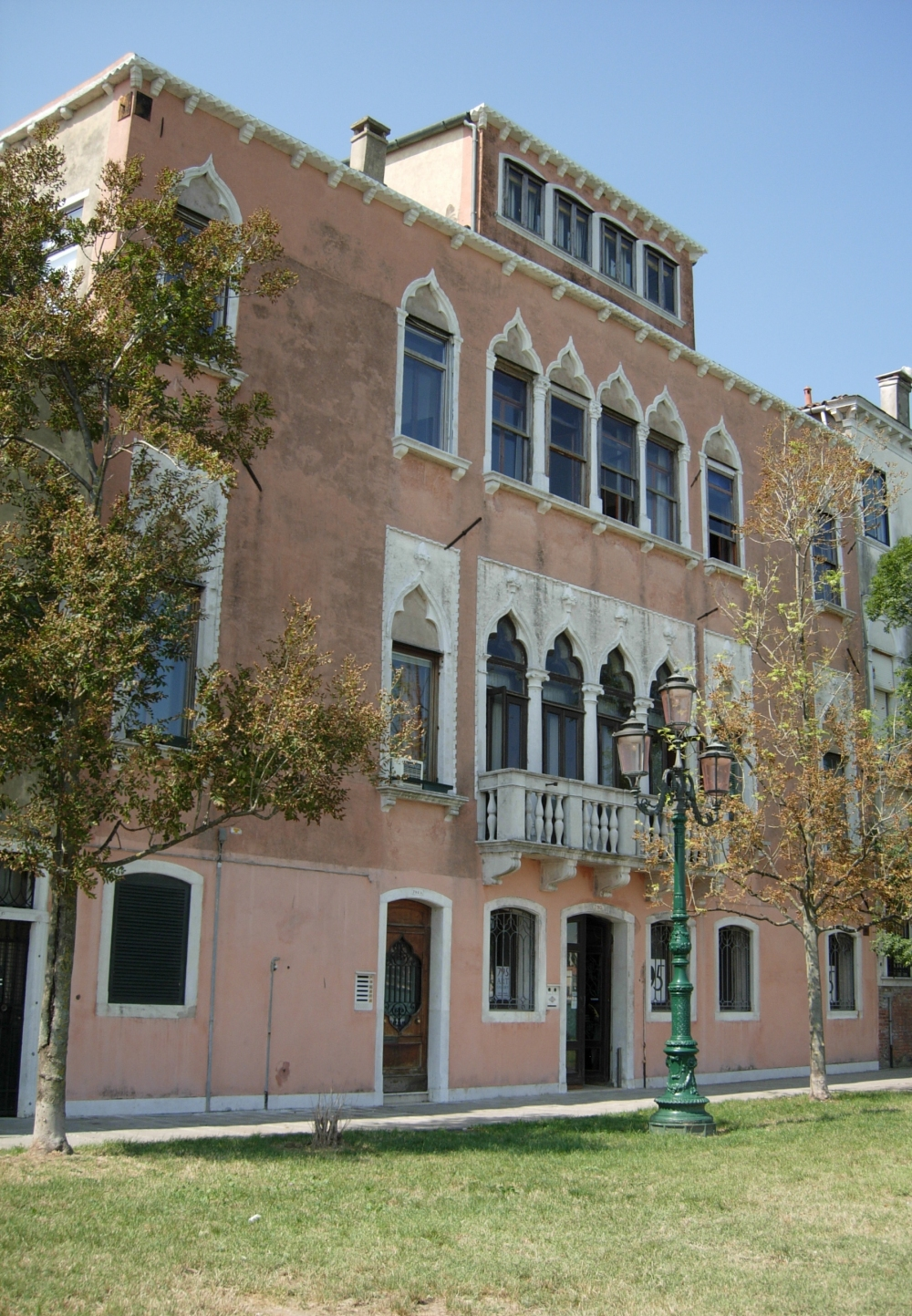
Palazzo Foscari on the island of Giudecca

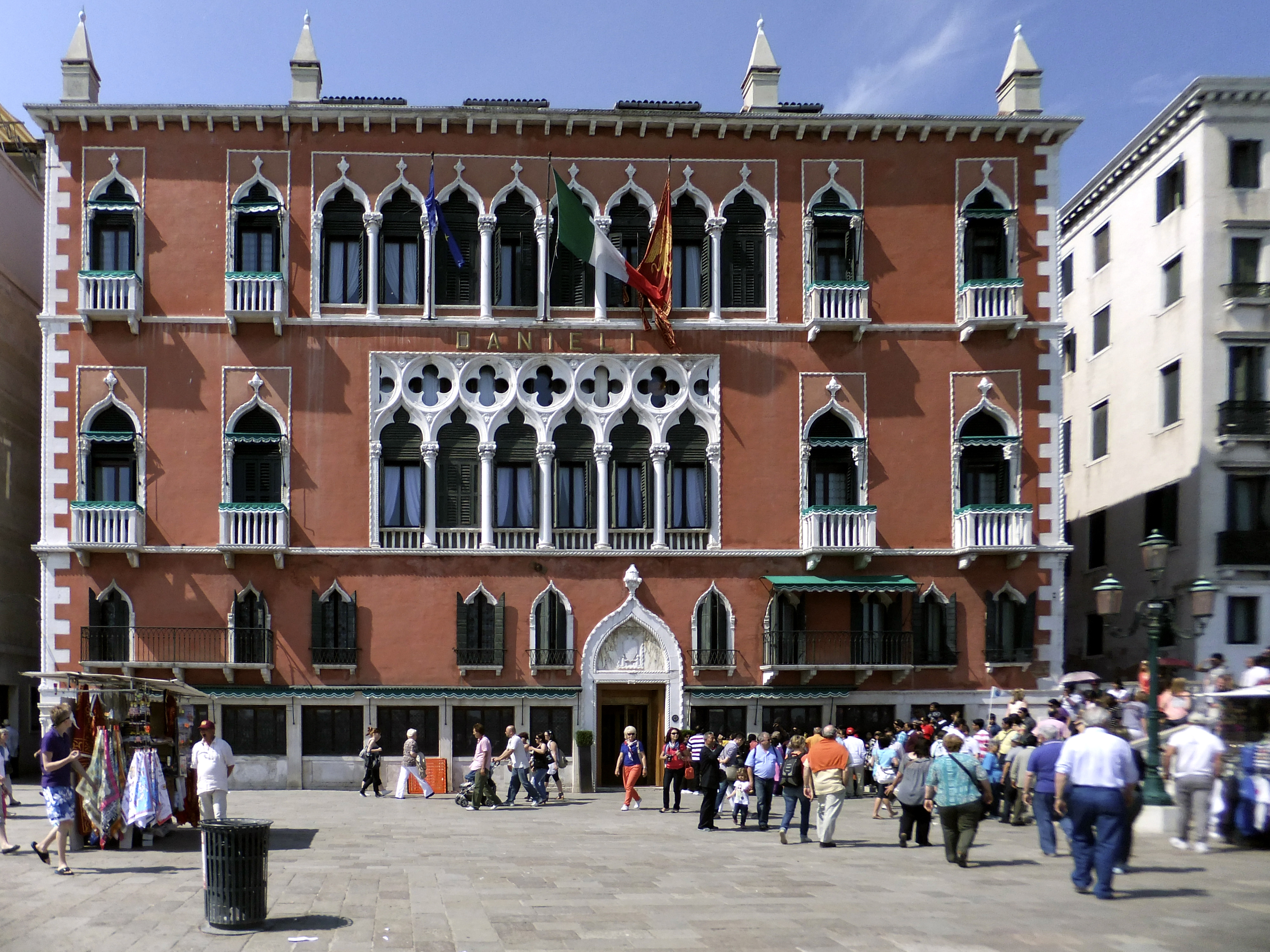
Palazzo Dandolo, somewhat "restored" and elaborated in the 19th century

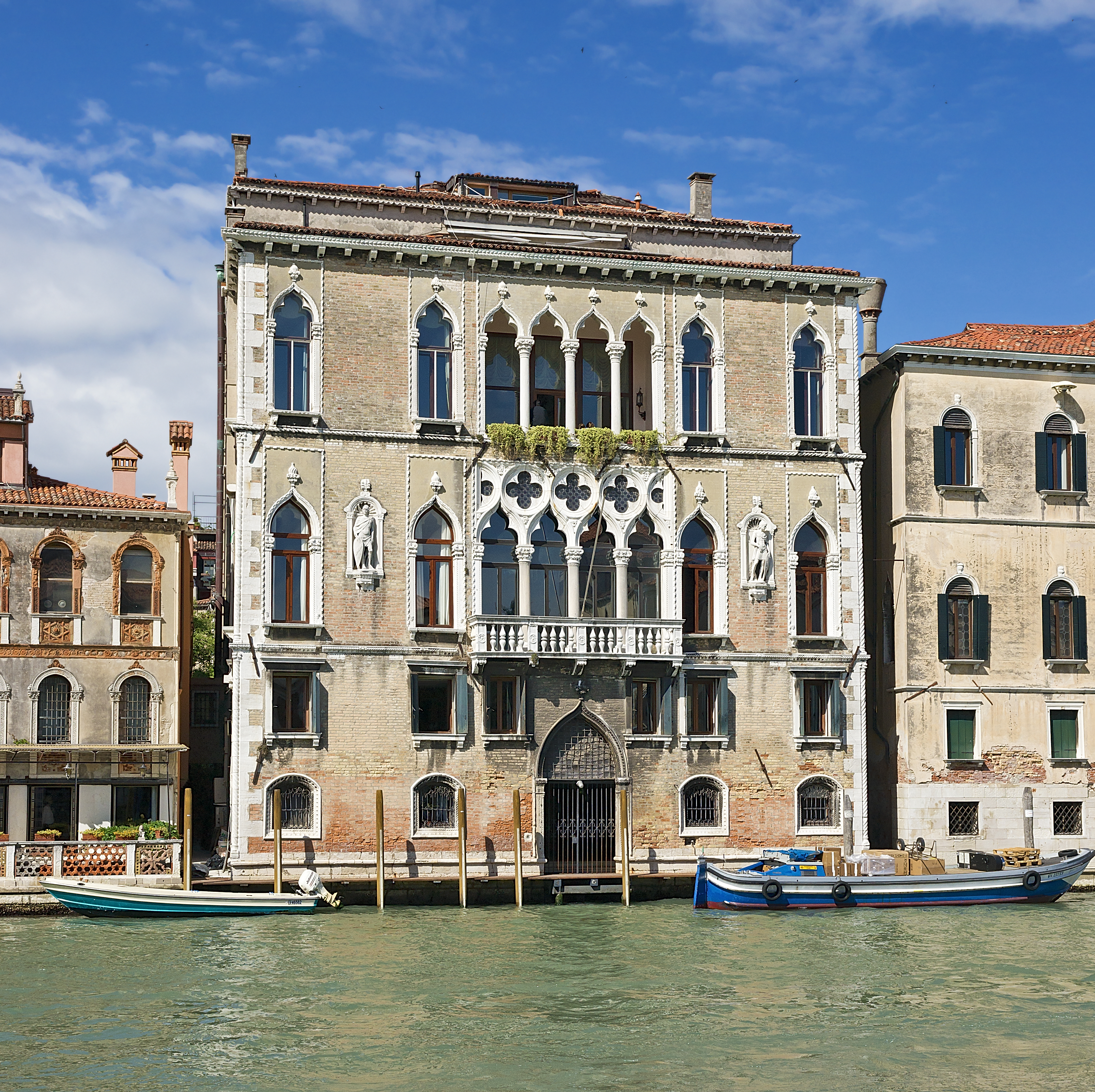
Palazzo Loredan dell'Ambasciatore. The rectangular windows of the mezzanine show this is fact a late 15th-century building, retaining a Gothic style into the Renaissance.

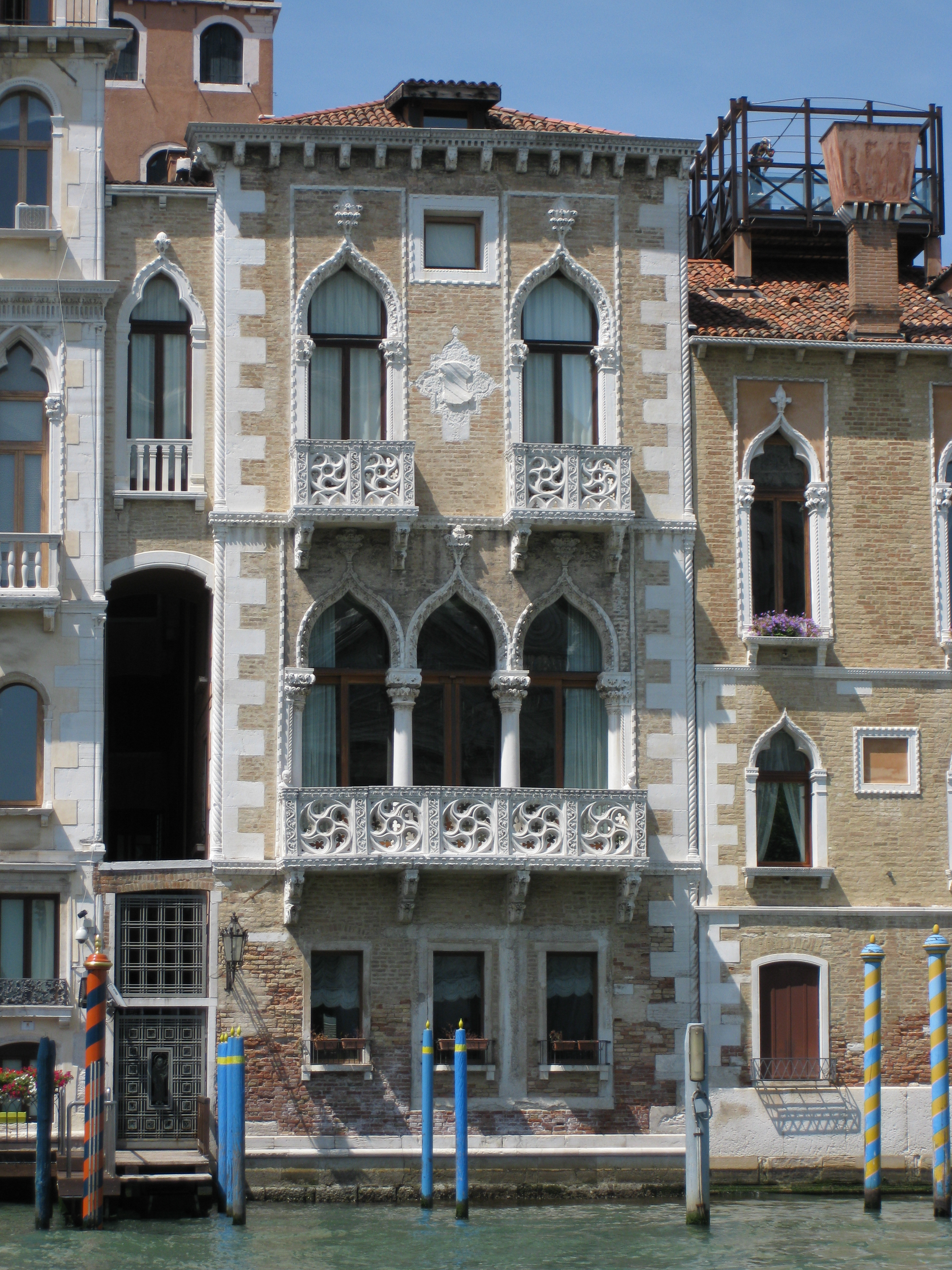
Palazzo Contarini Fasan

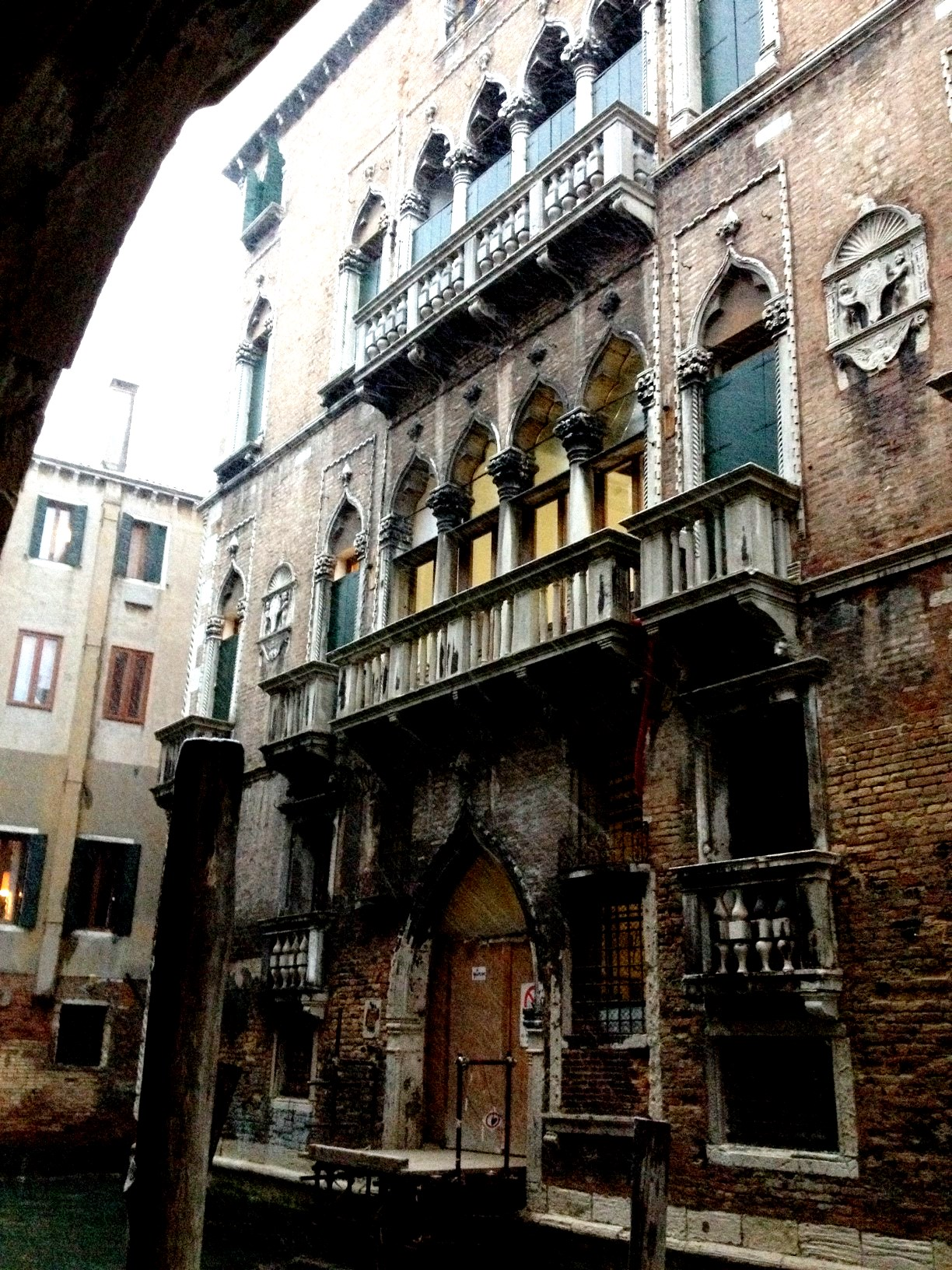
Palazzo Molin del Cuoridoro.

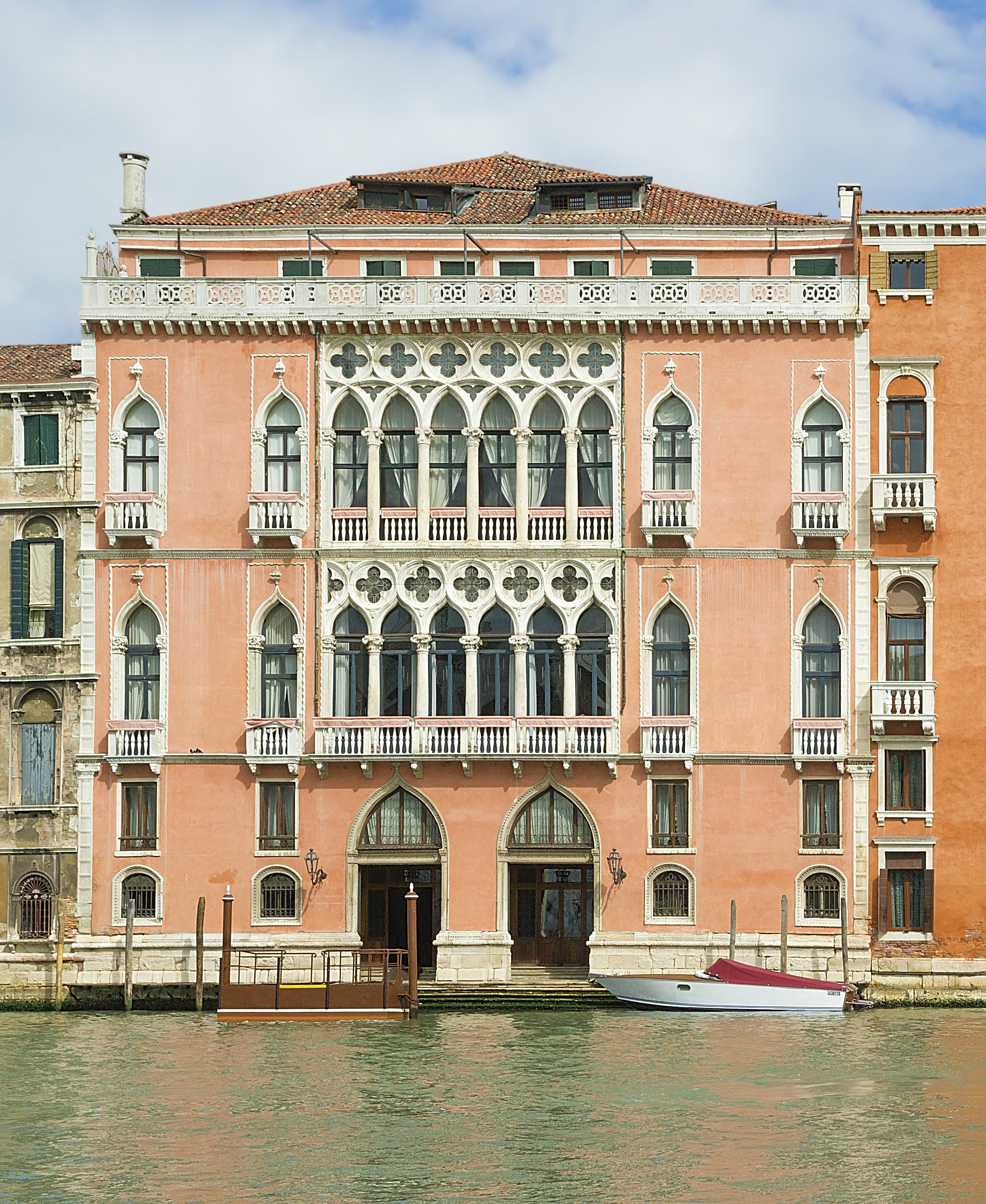
Palazzo Pisani Moretta in the sestiere of San Polo

== Revival ==
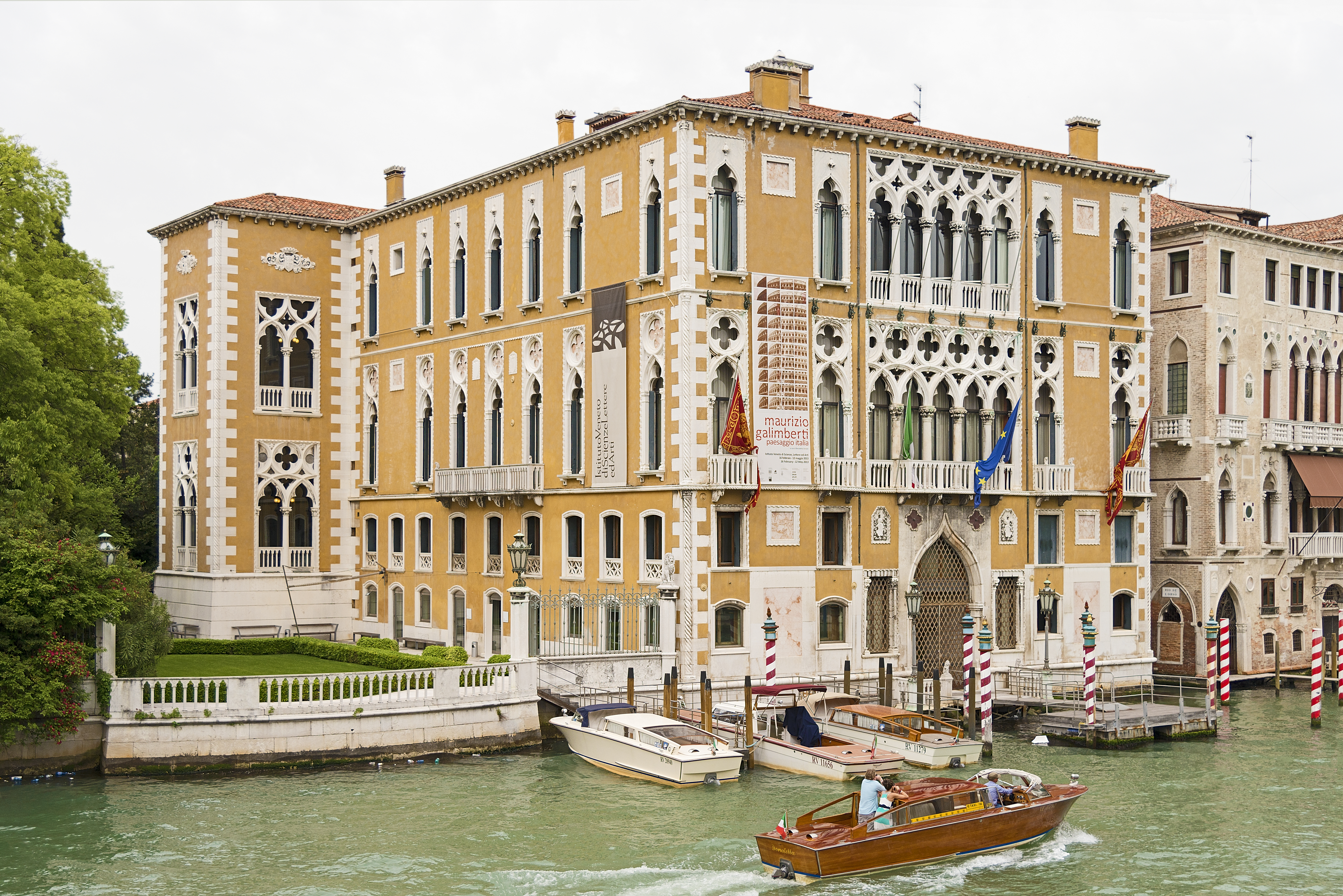
Palazzo Cavalli-Franchetti (1878)

The style was revived in the 19th century, largely through the influence of British architectural critic John Ruskin and his treatise The Stones of Venice. Because of the shortage of space in Venice, most palazzi were high (by medieval standards) rectangular boxes, with an ornamented facade, but very often plain on the other external elevations. Nor did they have space-wasting courtyards. Hence the basic shape suited 19th-century requirements very well, and the Venetian-ness of the style appeared mainly in the elaborate windows, cornice and other decoration to the facade.

In North America the style was popularized by architects Charles Amos Cummings, Frank Furness, Norman Shaw, William Robert Ware, Willard T. Sears, and Frederick William Stevens. In Australia, the architect William Pitt was an exponent of the style and Joseph Reed was known to experiment in it also.

=== Examples in Europe and elsewhere ===
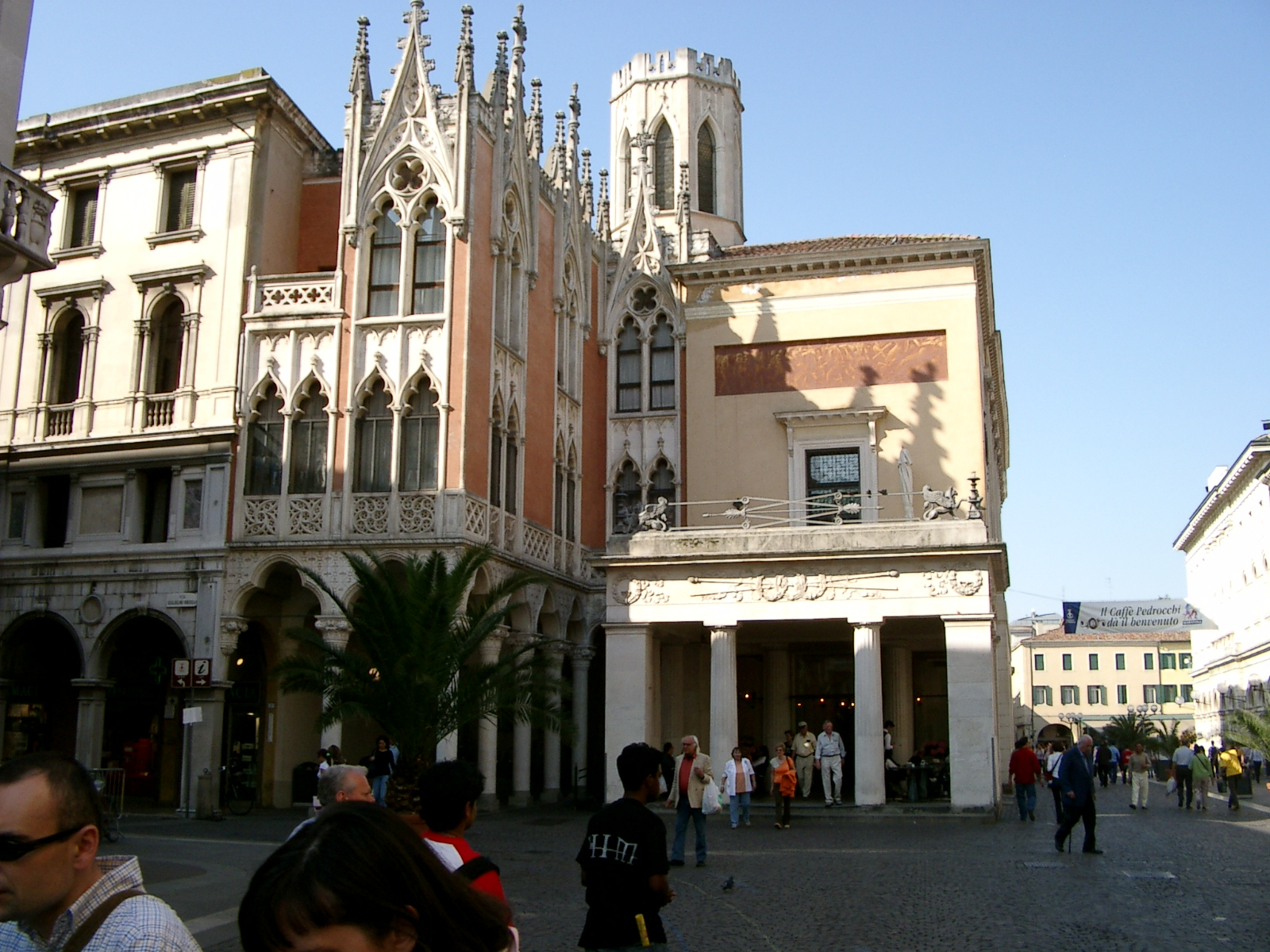
Caffè Pedrocchi in Padua, Italy (1839)

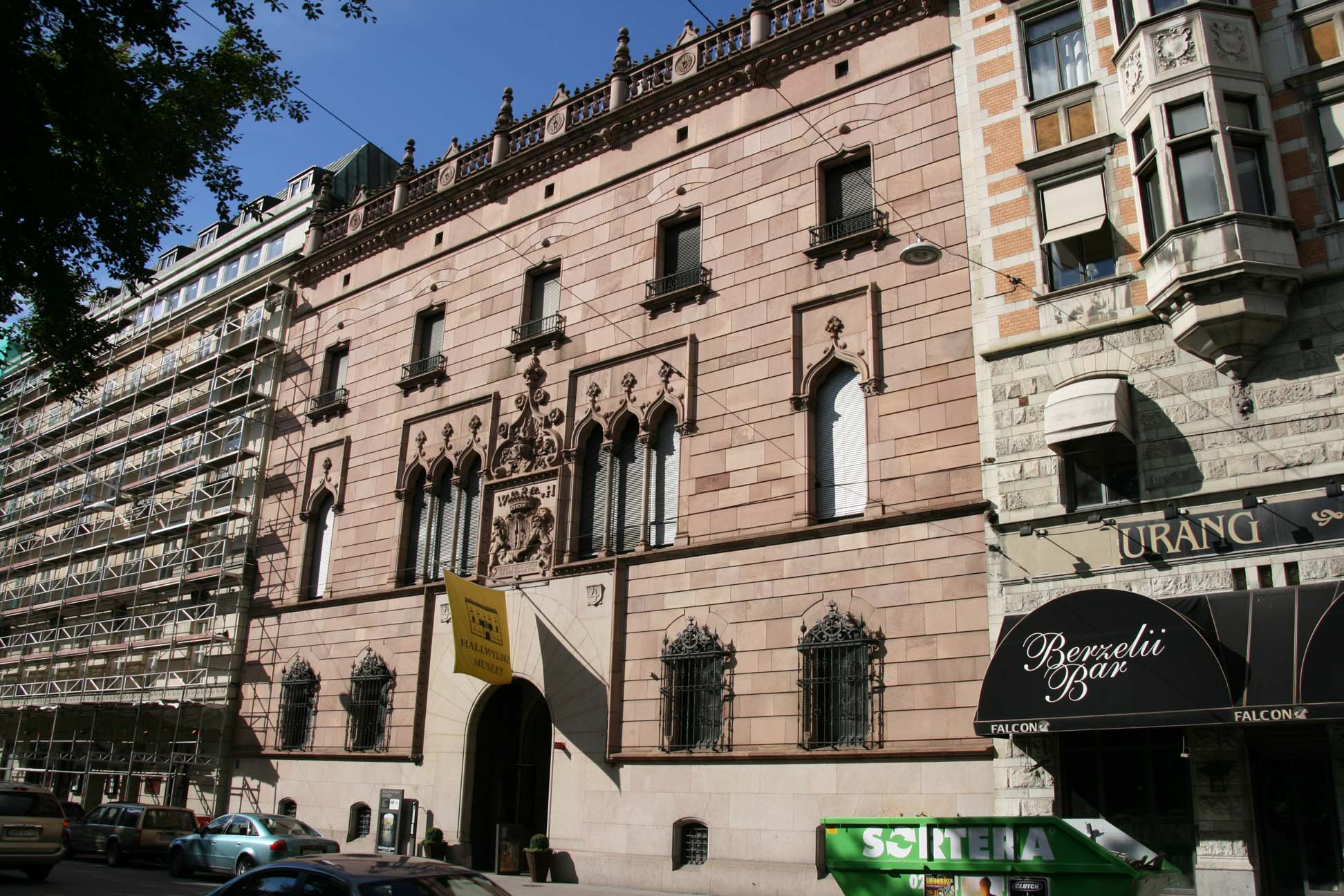
Hallwyl Museum in Stockholm, Sweden (1898)

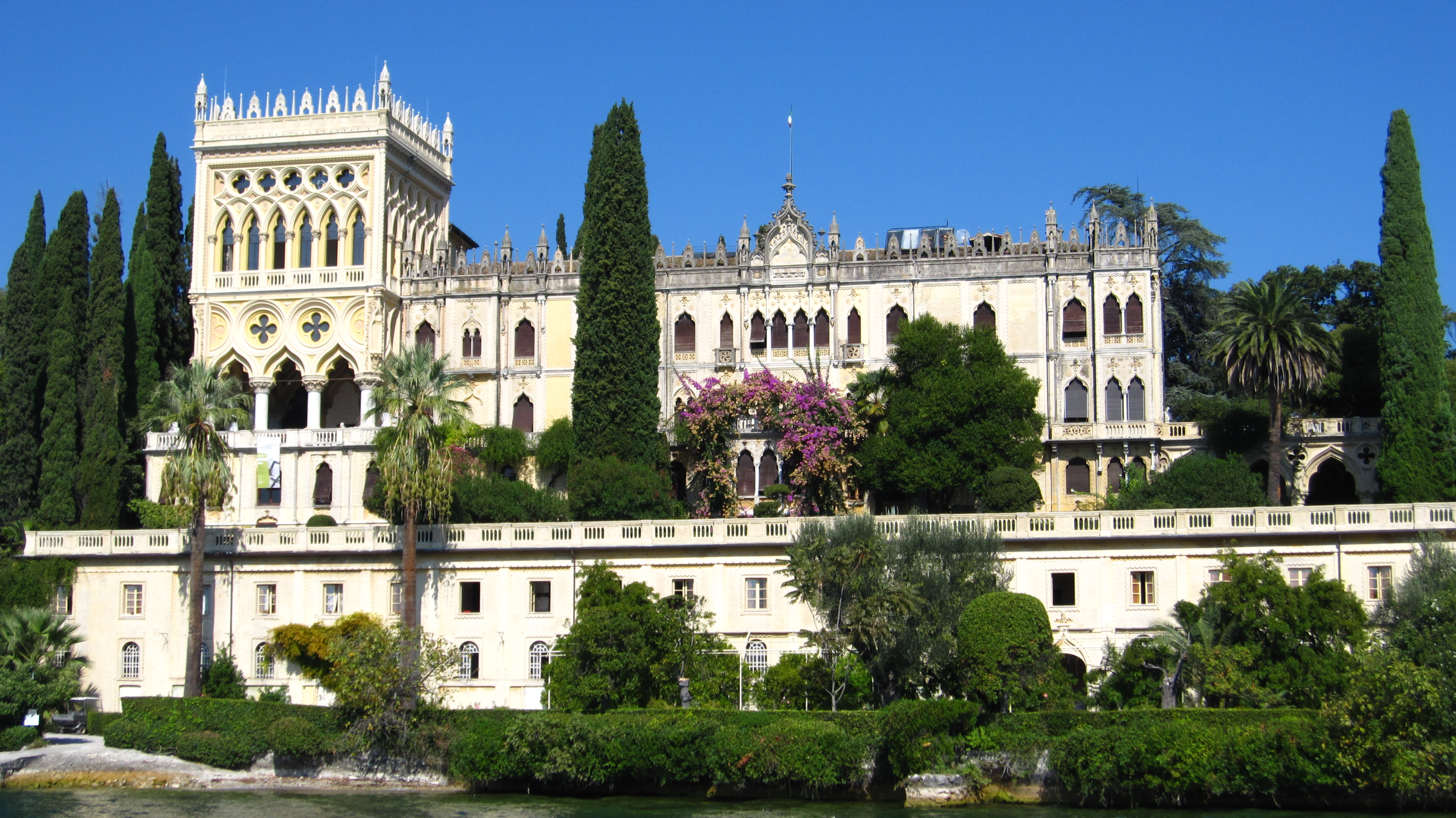
Isola del Garda in Brescia, Italy (1903)

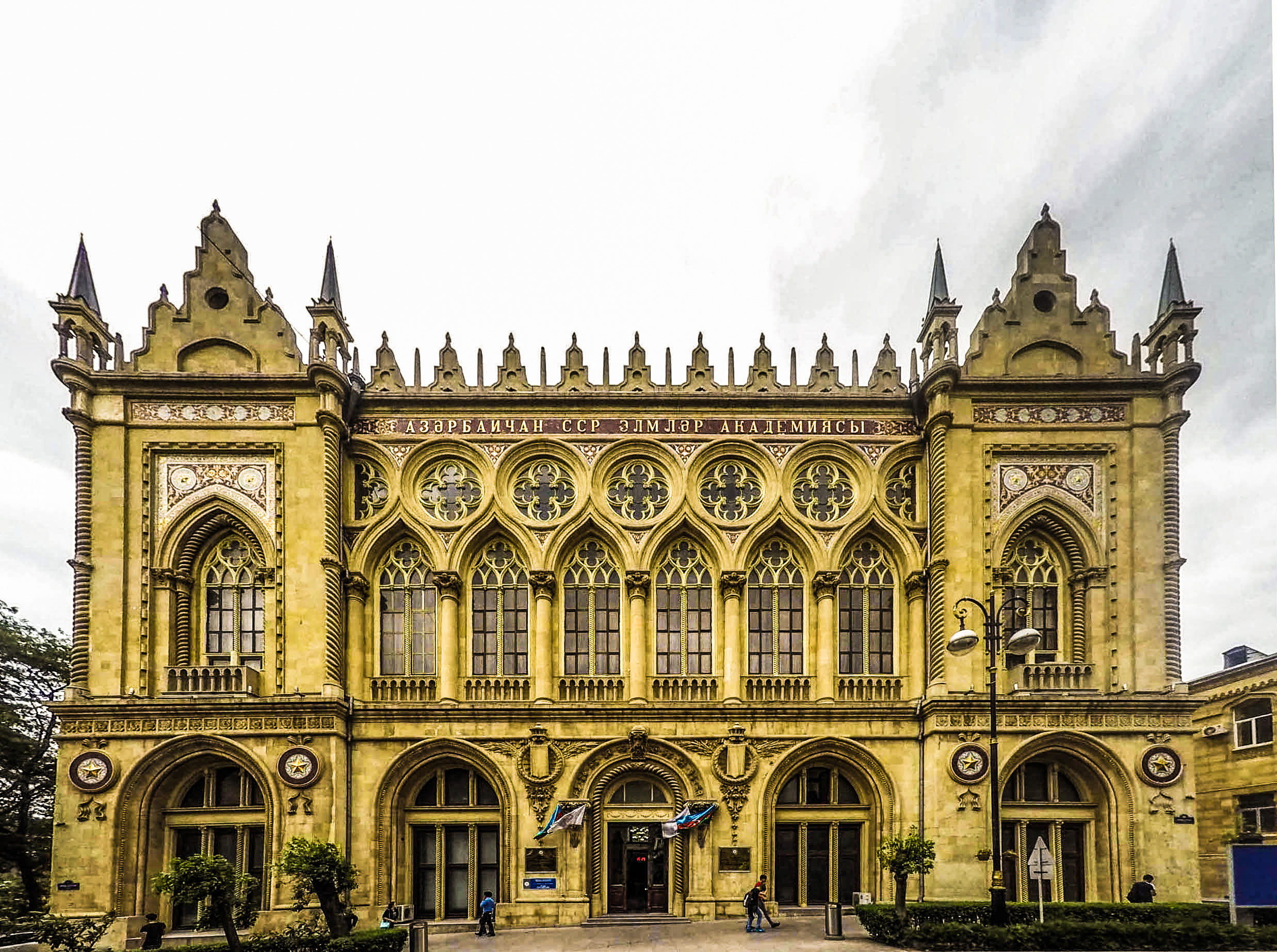
Ismailiyya Palace in Baku, Azerbaijan (1908–1913)

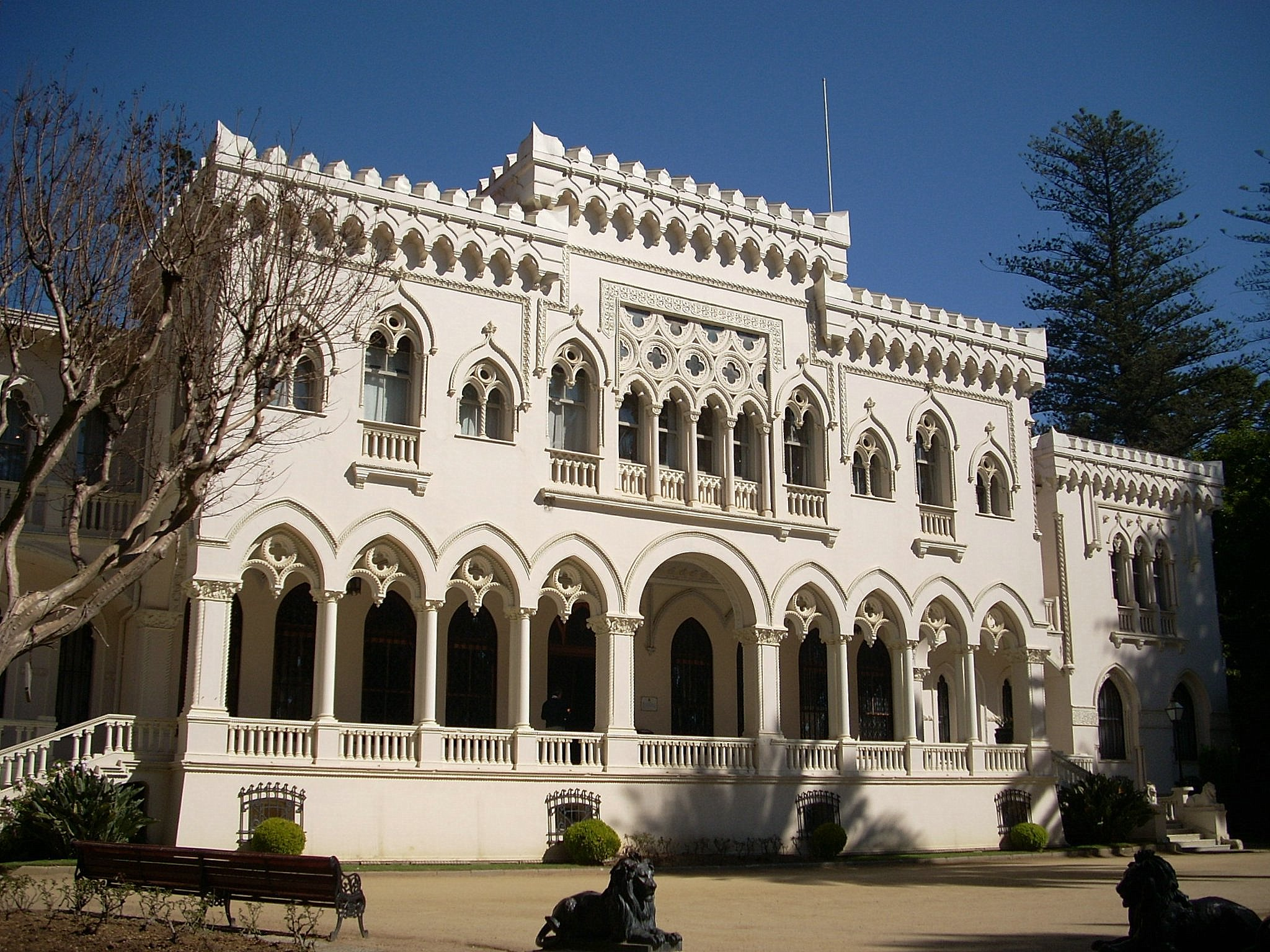
Vergara Palace in Viña del Mar, Chile (1910)

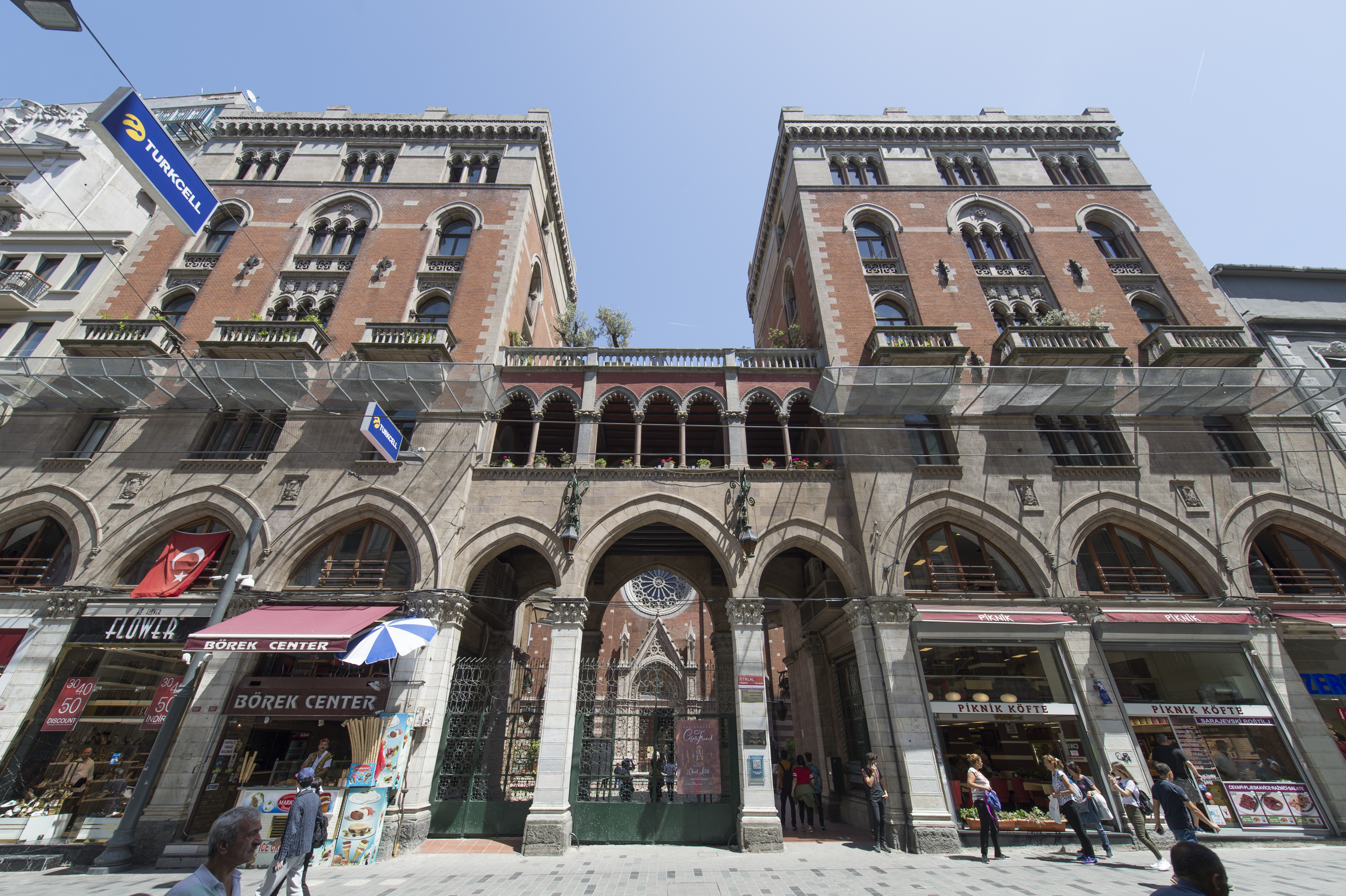
Church of St. Anthony of Padua in Istanbul, Turkey (1912)

=== Examples in the UK and Australia ===
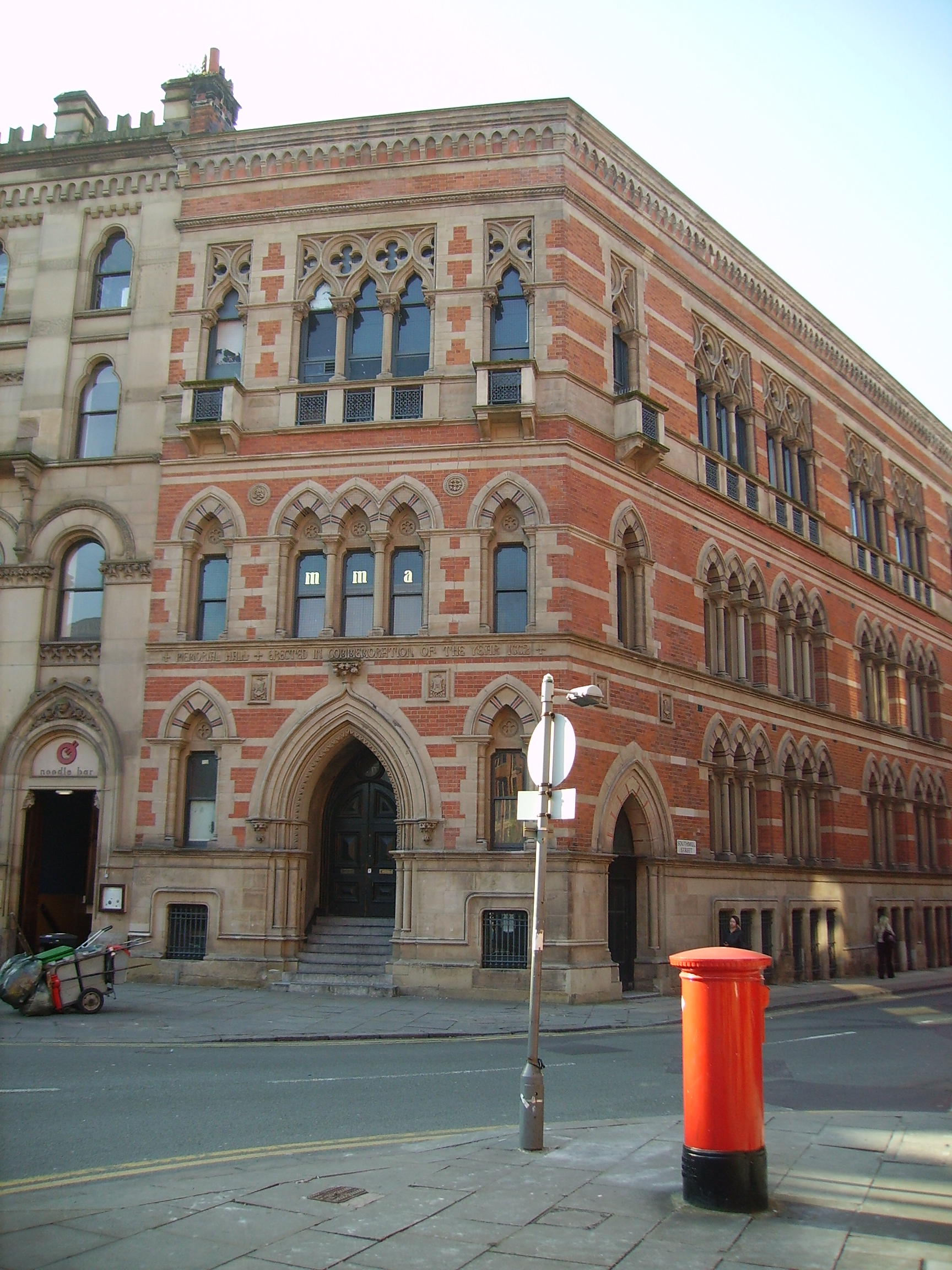
Memorial Hall in Manchester, England (1866)

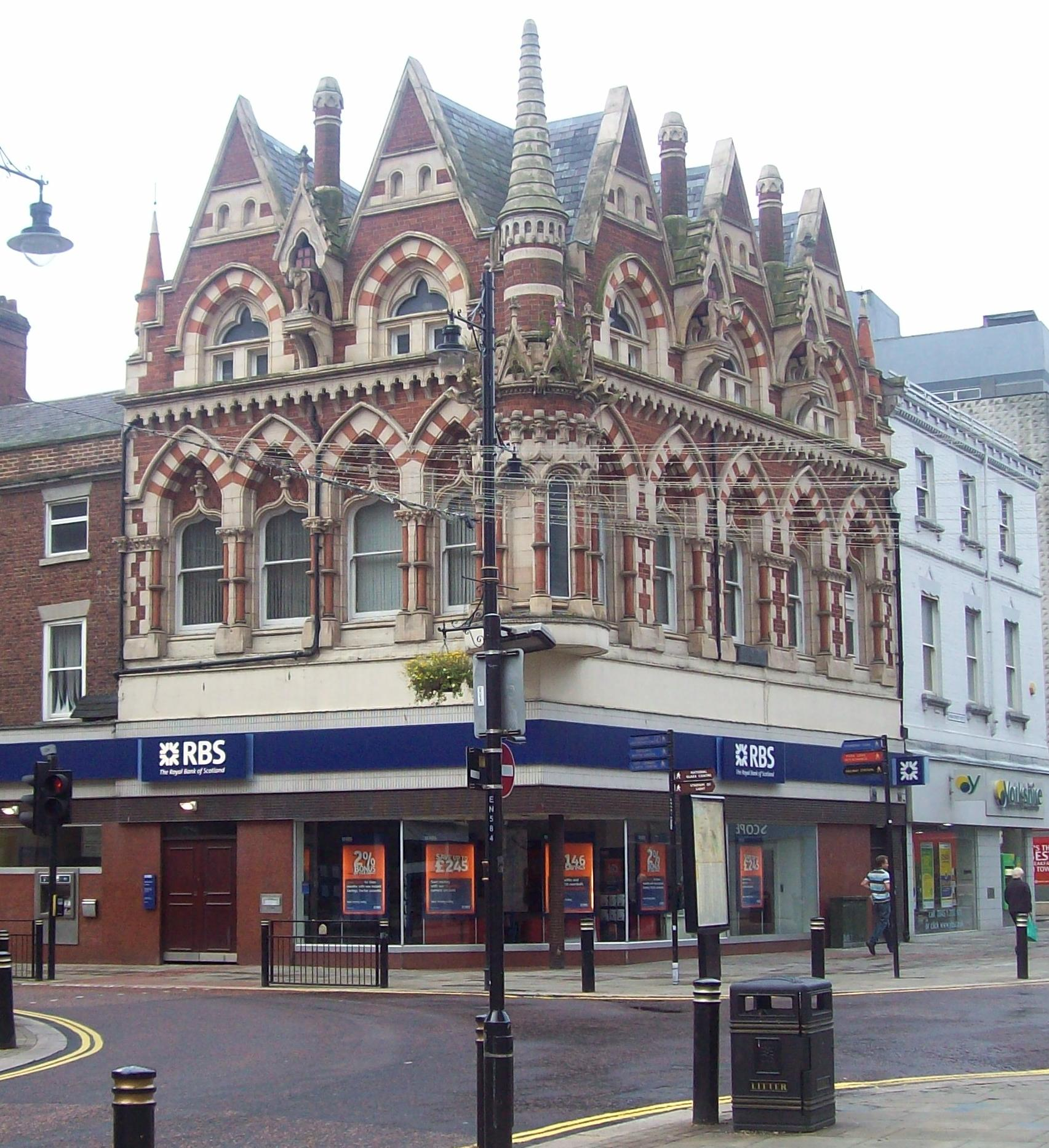
Elephant Tea Rooms in Sunderland, England (1872–1877)

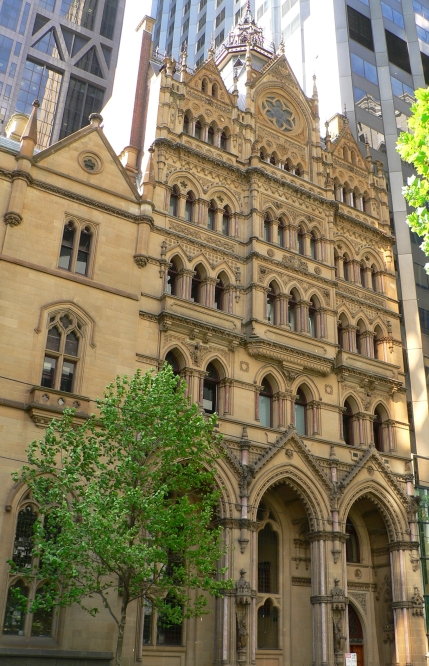
The former stock exchange on Collins Street in Melbourne, Australia, by William Pitt (1888)

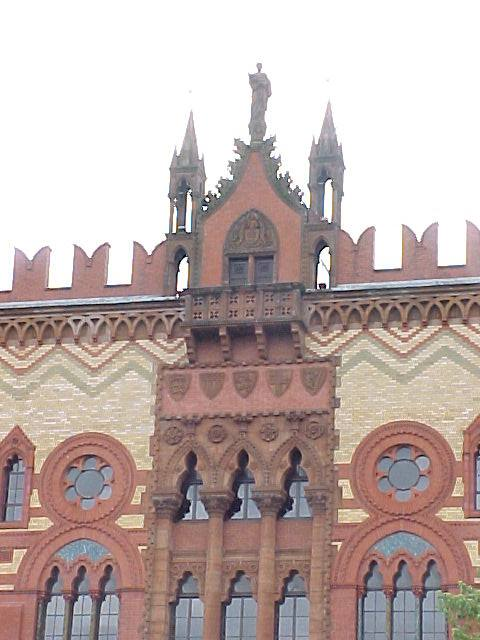
The western façade of a former carpet factory in Glasgow, Scotland (1892)

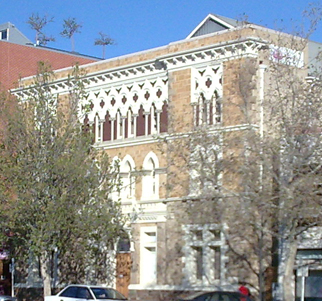
Our Boys Institute in Adelaide, Australia (1896)

=== Examples in the USA ===
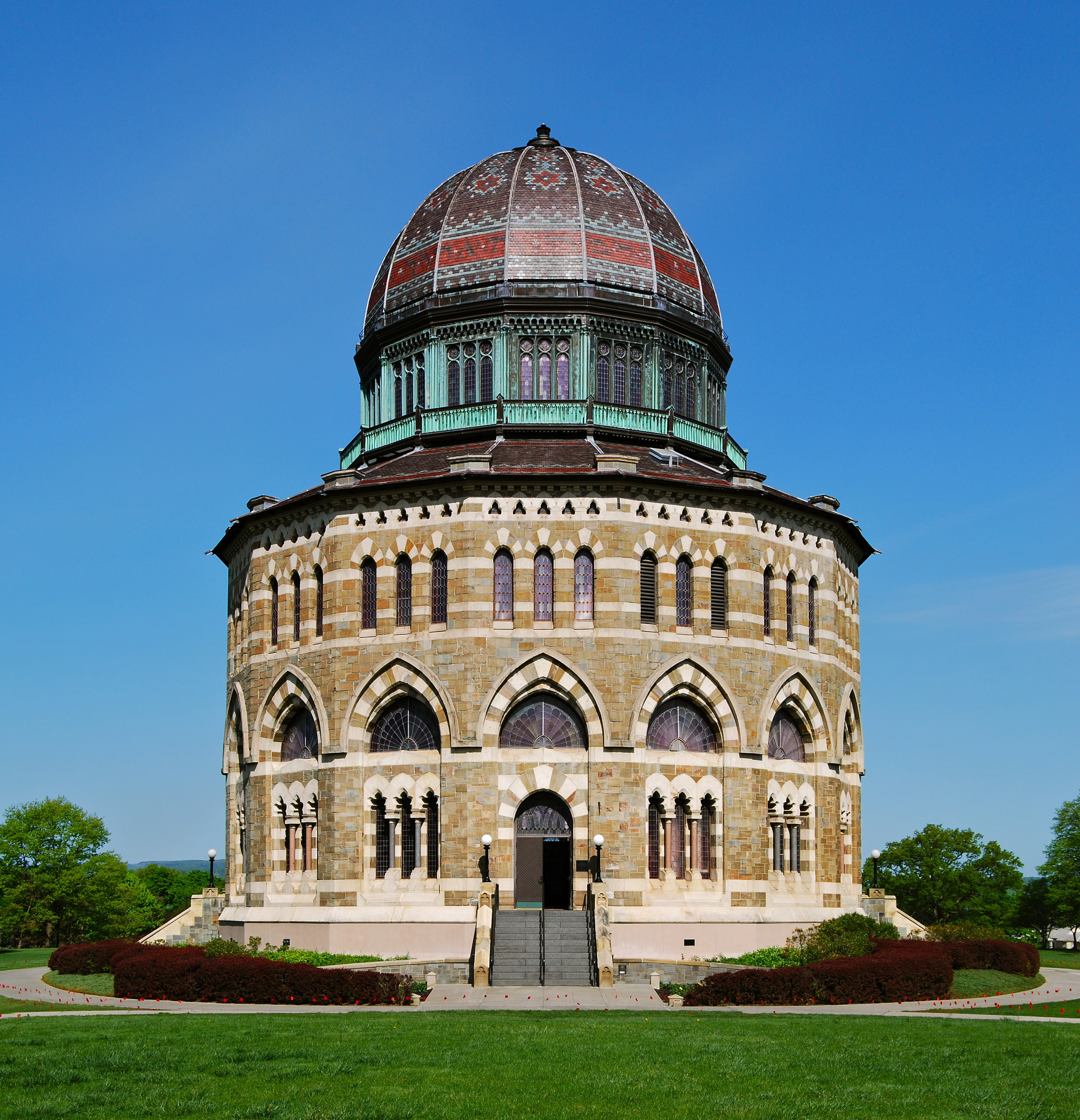
Nott Memorial, Union College in Schenectady, New York (1858–1879)

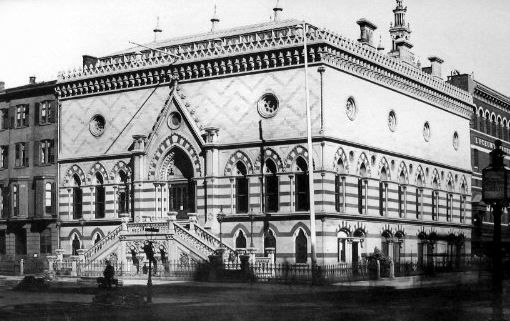
National Academy of Design in New York City (1863–1865, now destroyed)

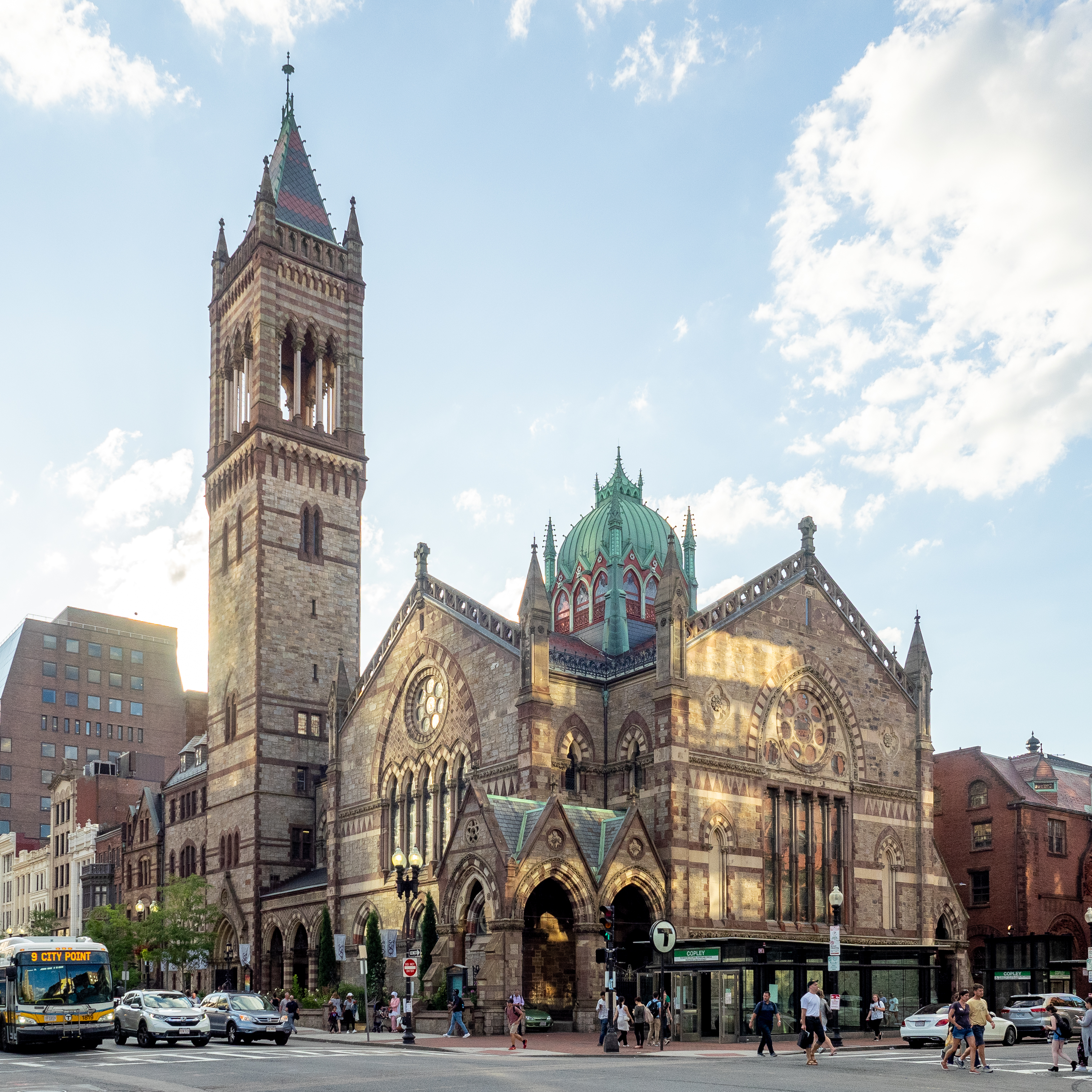
Old South Church in Boston (1873)

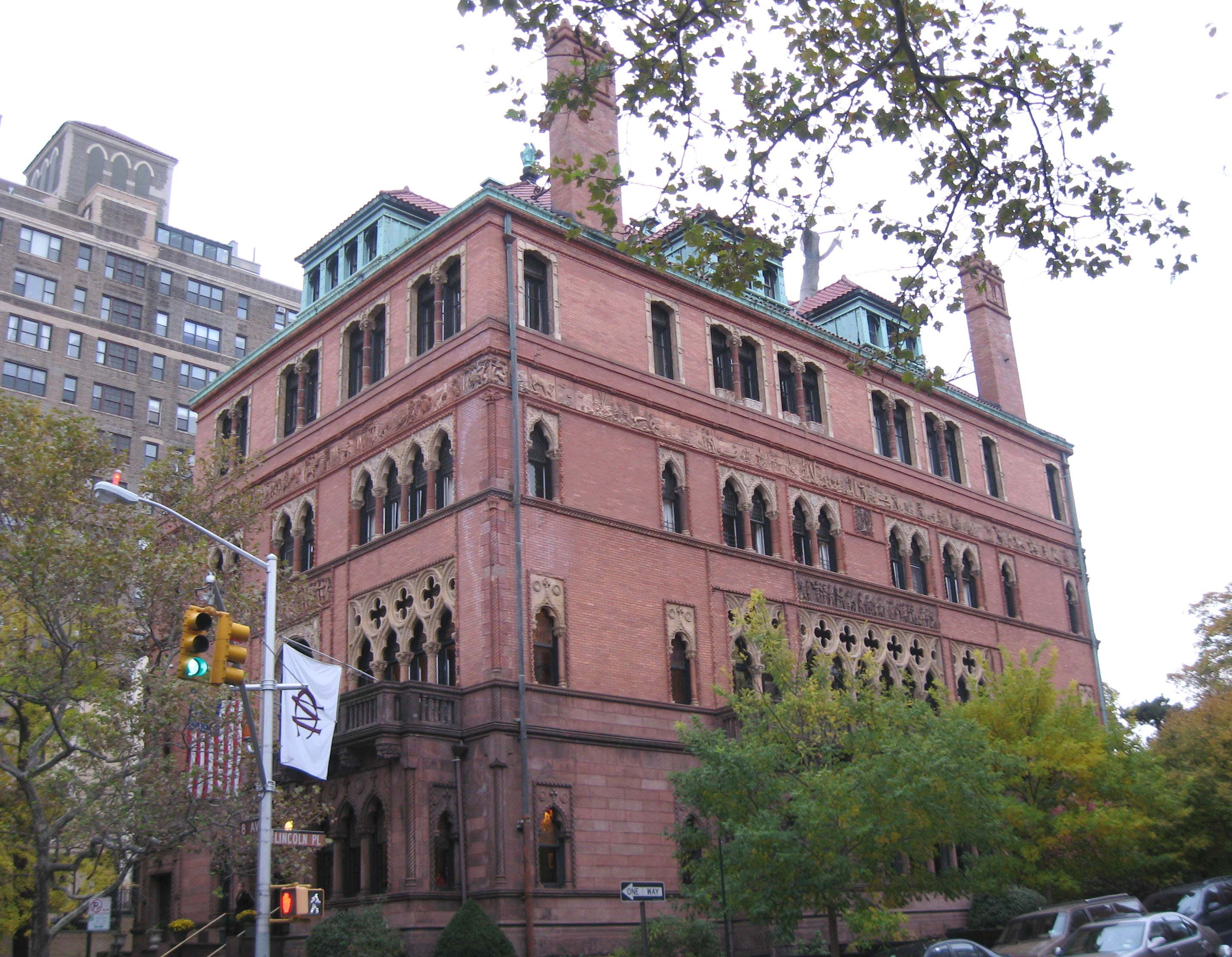
Montauk Club Clubhouse, Park Slope in New York City (1889–1891)

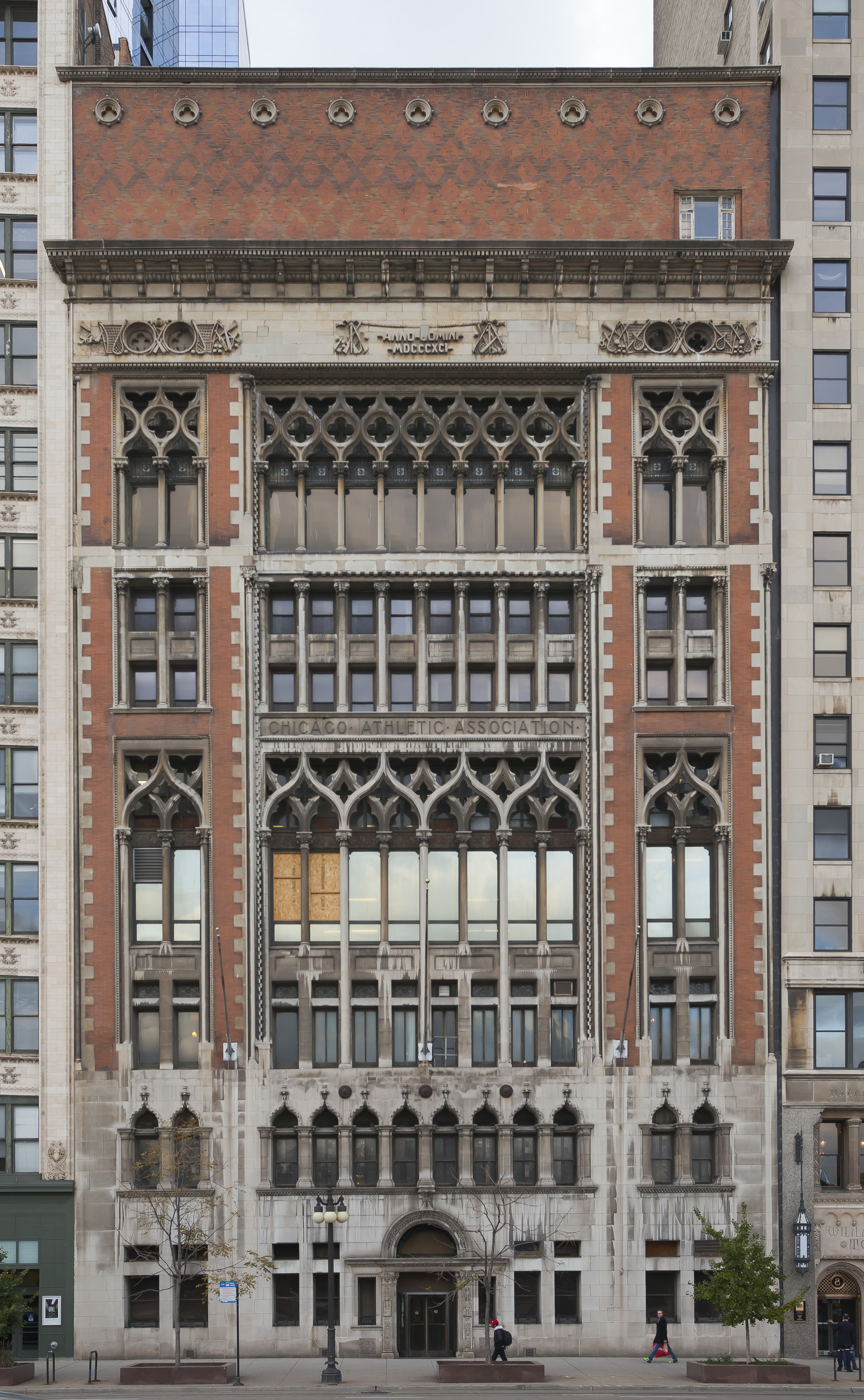
Façade of the Chicago Athletic Association in Chicago (1893)

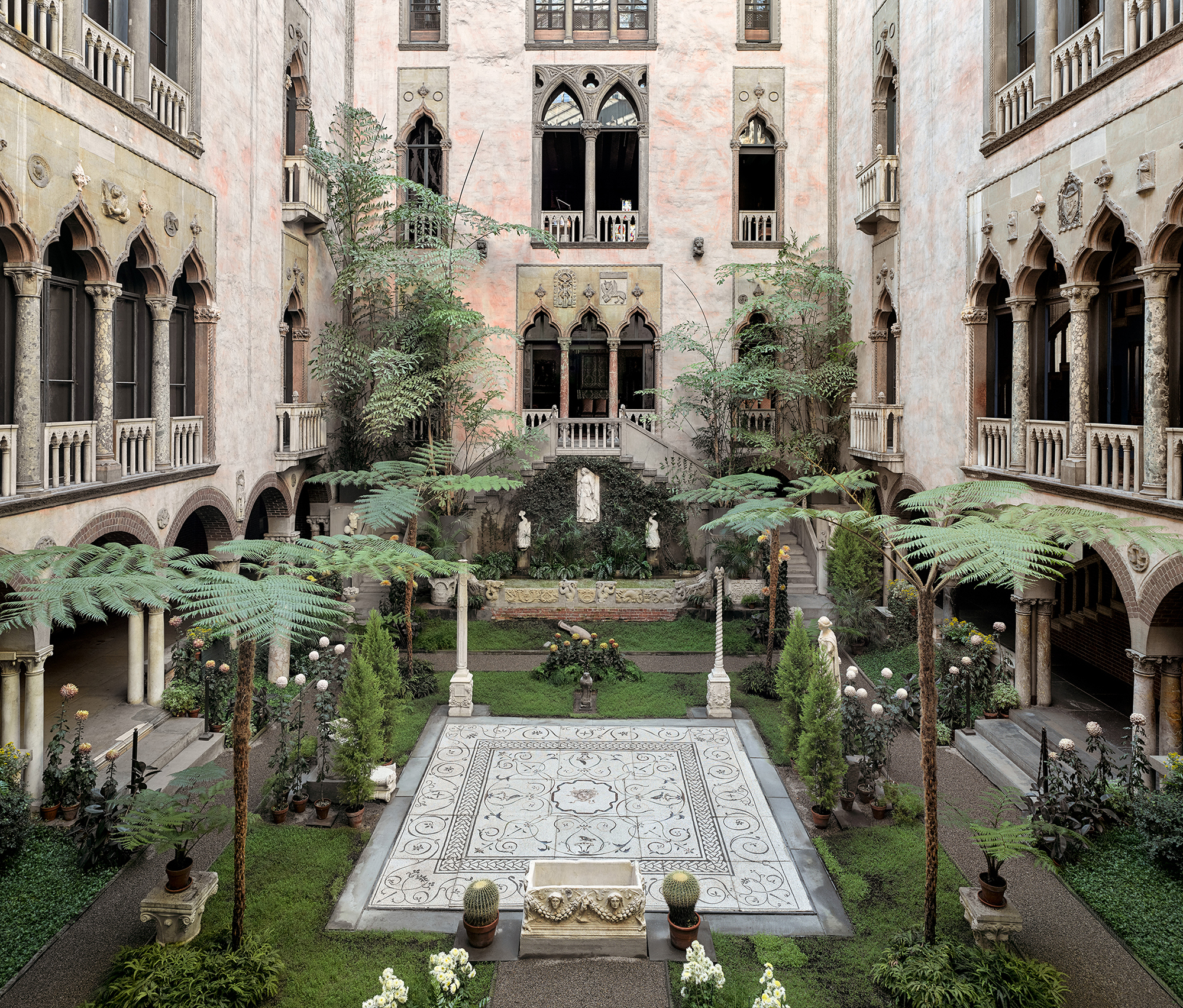
Courtyard at the Isabella Stewart Gardner Museum in Boston (1898–1901)

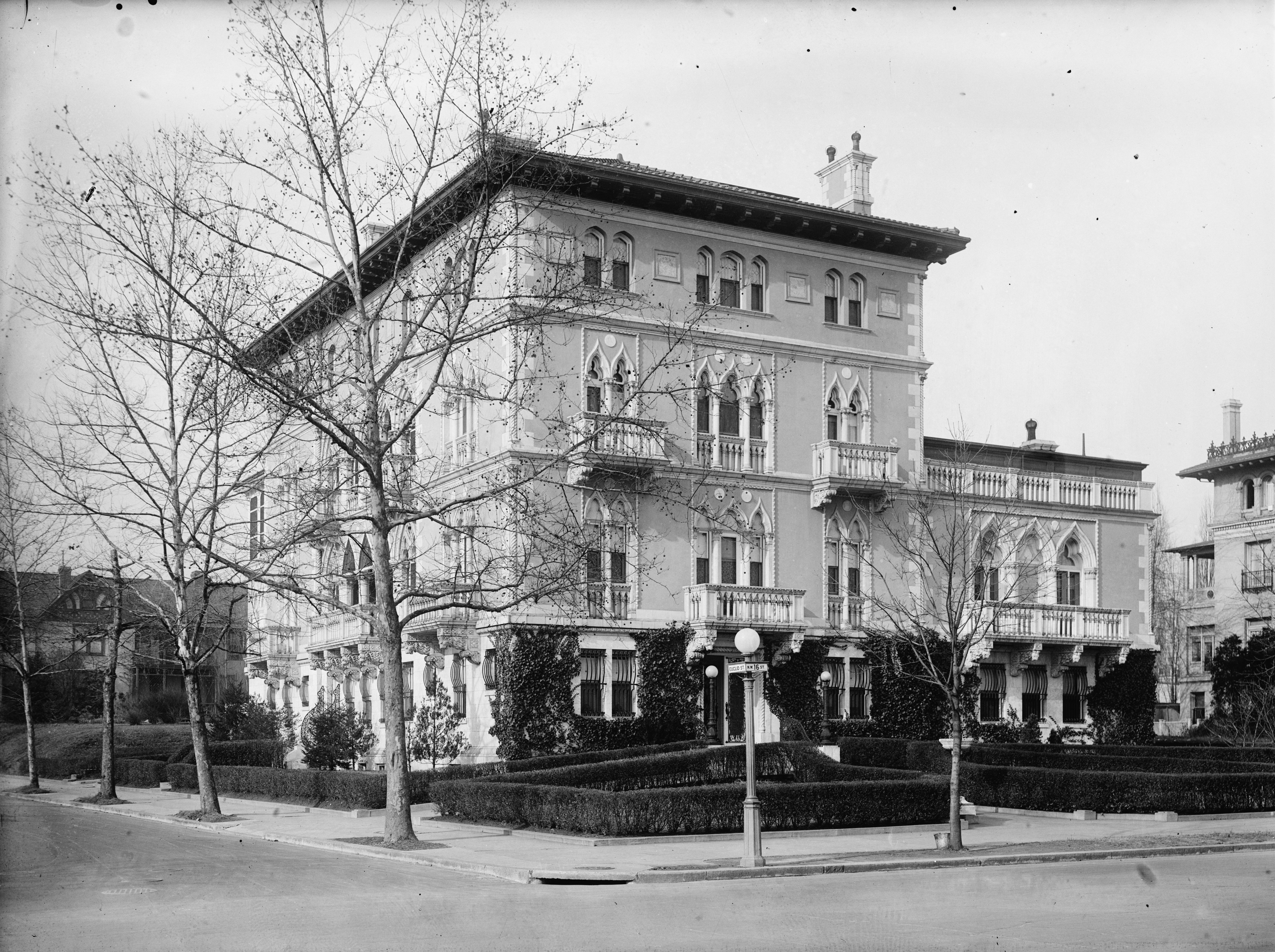
Pink Palace, also known as the Mrs. Marshall Field House and the Inter-American Defense Board, in Washington D.C. (1906)

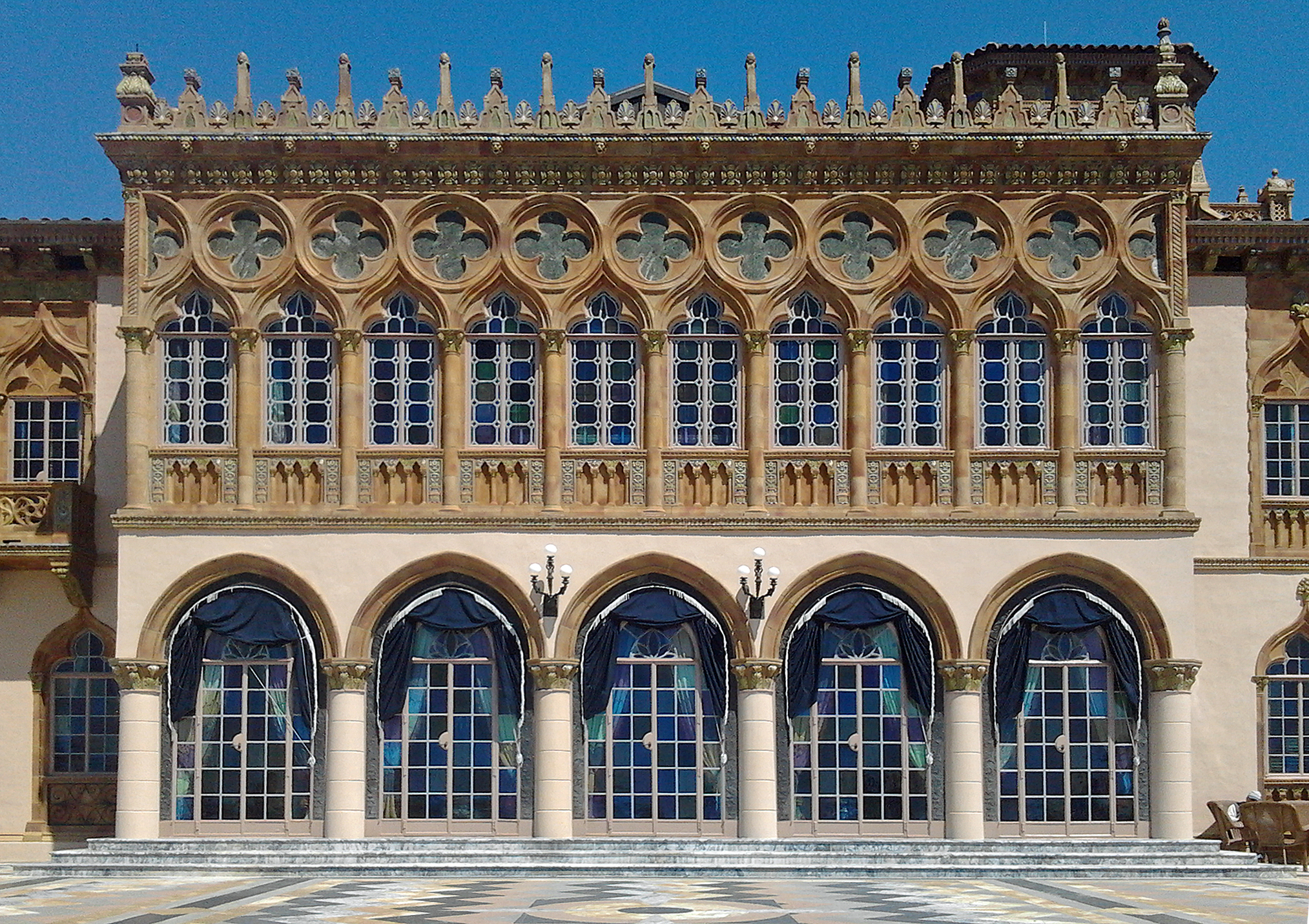
Cà d'Zan in Sarasota, Florida (1926)

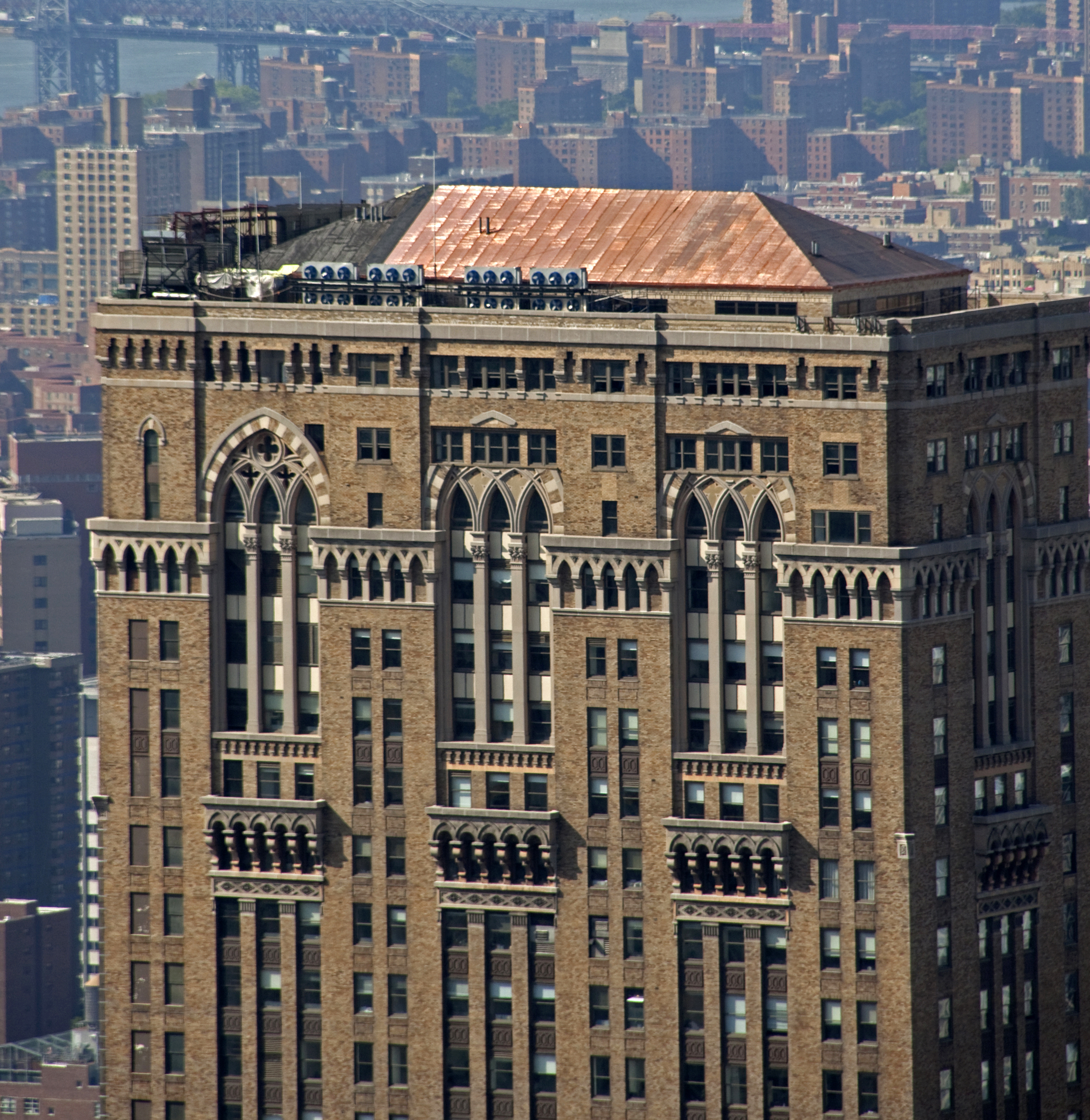
One Grand Central Place, originally the Lincoln Building, in New York City (1930)

== See also ==
- Venetian Renaissance architecture
- Italian Gothic architecture
- History of the Doge's Palace in Venice
- Symbolism of domes
