= Venetian =

Venetian often means from or related to:

- Venice, a city in Italy
- Veneto, a region of Italy
- Republic of Venice (697–1797), a historical nation in that area

Venetians might refer to:

- Masters of Venetian painting in 15th-16th centuries
- City dwellers of Venice

Venetian and the like may also refer to:

- Venetian language, a Romance language spoken mostly in the Veneto region
- Venice, Florida, a city in Sarasota County, United States
- The Venetian Las Vegas, a resort hotel and casino in Las Vegas, Nevada
- The Venetian Macao, a hotel and casino in Macau, China
- Venetian blind, or Venetian, a common type of window blind similar to Persian blind
- Venetian curtain, a type of theater front curtain
- The Venetian Woman, The Venetian Comedy, or The Venetian originally La veniexiana (play), a comedy in Venetian language, 1535-1537
- The Venetians, an 1892 novel by Mary Elizabeth Braddon
- The Venetian (play), a work by Clifford Bax
- The Venetian (film), a 1958 TV movie directed by Ingmar Bergman
- The Venetians (novel), an 1893 novel by M. E. Braddon
- The Venetians a 2013 sculptural work by Pawel Althamer
- The Venetian Woman (La venexiana), 1986 Italian erotic film by Mauro Bolognini
- Venetian Snares, a Canadian musician
- Venetian fonts or typefaces
- Venetian, a popular Australian biscuit produced by Arnott's

== See also ==
- Friulan, related to or from Friuli-Venezia Giulia region of Italy
- Venice (disambiguation)
- Veneti (disambiguation)
- Venetia (disambiguation)
- List of things named Venetian
- Phoenician (disambiguation)
