= 2021 AG2R Citroën Team season =

Cycling team season

AG2R Citroën Team
- 2021 season
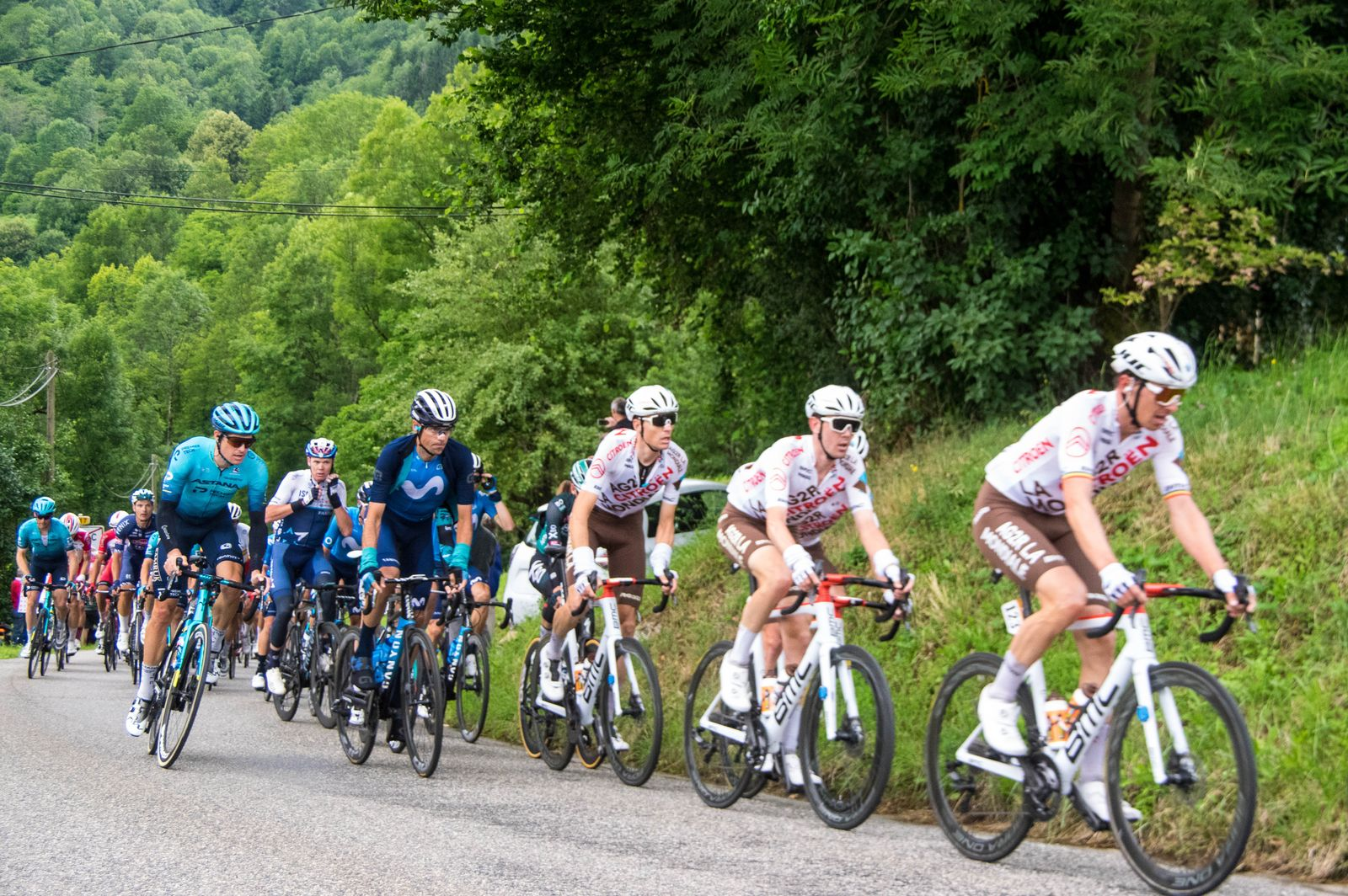
- AG2R Citroën Team on Stage 16 of the Tour de France
- UCI code: ACT
- Status: UCI WorldTeam
- World Tour Rank: 8th
- Manager: Vincent Lavenu (FRA)
- Main sponsor(s): AG2R La Mondiale; Citroën
- Based: France
- Bicycles: BMC
- Groupset: Campagnolo

Season victories
- One-day races: 6
- Stage race stages: 5
- Most wins: Dorian Godon (FRA); Andrea Vendrame (ITA); (3 each)
- Best ranked rider: Ben O'Connor (AUS) (40th)
- Jersey

The 2021 season for the AG2R Citroën Team was the 30th season in the team's existence and the 16th consecutive season that it was a UCI WorldTeam. French automobile manufacturer Citroën joined as a title sponsor, alongside longtime title sponsor AG2R La Mondiale, a French insurance firm.

== Team roster ==
As of 9 October 2021.

| Rider | Date of birth |
|---|---|
| Clément Berthet (Note: Berthet joined from Delko on 1 August.) (FRA) | 2 August 1997 (aged 23) |
| François Bidard (FRA) | 12 March 1992 (aged 28) |
| Geoffrey Bouchard (FRA) | 1 April 1992 (aged 28) |
| Lilian Calmejane (FRA) | 6 December 1992 (aged 28) |
| Clément Champoussin (FRA) | 29 May 1998 (aged 22) |
| Mikaël Cherel (FRA) | 17 March 1986 (aged 34) |
| Benoît Cosnefroy (FRA) | 17 October 1995 (aged 25) |
| Thomas Delphis (Note: Delphis, Lapeira, and Retailleau joined as stagiaires from AG2R Citroën Team U23 Team on 1 August.) (FRA) | 1 June 1999 (aged 21) |
| Stan Dewulf (BEL) | 20 December 1997 (aged 23) |
| Julien Duval (FRA) | 27 May 1990 (aged 30) |
| Mathias Frank (SUI) | 9 December 1986 (aged 34) |
| Tony Gallopin (FRA) | 24 May 1988 (aged 32) |
| Ben Gastauer (LUX) | 14 November 1987 (aged 33) |
| Dorian Godon (FRA) | 25 May 1996 (aged 24) |
| Alexis Gougeard (FRA) | 5 March 1993 (aged 27) |
| Jaakko Hänninen (FIN) | 16 April 1997 (aged 23) |
| Anthony Jullien (FRA) | 5 March 1998 (aged 22) |

| Rider | Date of birth |
|---|---|
| Bob Jungels (LUX) | 22 September 1992 (aged 28) |
| Paul Lapeira (FRA) | 25 February 2000 (aged 20) |
| Lawrence Naesen (BEL) | 28 August 1992 (aged 28) |
| Oliver Naesen (BEL) | 16 September 1990 (aged 30) |
| Ben O'Connor (AUS) | 25 November 1995 (aged 25) |
| Aurélien Paret-Peintre (FRA) | 27 February 1996 (aged 24) |
| Nans Peters (FRA) | 12 March 1994 (aged 26) |
| Nicolas Prodhomme (FRA) | 1 February 1997 (aged 23) |
| Valentin Retailleau (FRA) | 18 June 2000 (aged 20) |
| Marc Sarreau (FRA) | 10 June 1993 (aged 27) |
| Michael Schär (SUI) | 29 September 1986 (aged 34) |
| Damien Touzé (FRA) | 7 July 1996 (aged 24) |
| Greg Van Avermaet (BEL) | 17 May 1985 (aged 35) |
| Gijs Van Hoecke (BEL) | 12 November 1991 (aged 29) |
| Andrea Vendrame (ITA) | 20 July 1994 (aged 26) |
| Clément Venturini (FRA) | 16 October 1993 (aged 27) |
| Larry Warbasse (USA) | 28 January 1990 (aged 30) |

Riders who joined the team for the 2021 season

| Rider | 2020 team |
|---|---|
| Clément Berthet | Nippo–Delko–One Provence |
| Lilian Calmejane | Total Direct Énergie |
| Stan Dewulf | Lotto–Soudal |
| Anthony Jullien | neo-pro (Chambéry CF) |
| Bob Jungels | Deceuninck–Quick-Step |
| Ben O'Connor | NTT Pro Cycling |
| Nicolas Prodhomme | neo-pro (VC Villefranche Beaujolais) |
| Marc Sarreau | Groupama–FDJ |
| Michael Schär | CCC Team |
| Damien Touzé | Cofidis |
| Greg Van Avermaet | CCC Team |
| Gijs Van Hoecke | CCC Team |

Riders who left the team during or after the 2020 season

| Rider | 2021 team |
|---|---|
| Romain Bardet | Team DSM |
| Clément Chevrier | Retired |
| Silvan Dillier | Alpecin–Fenix |
| Axel Domont | Retired |
| Alexandre Geniez | Total Direct Énergie |
| Quentin Jaurégui | B&B Hotels p/b KTM |
| Pierre Latour | Total Direct Énergie |
| Harry Tanfield | Team Qhubeka Assos |
| Stijn Vandenbergh | Retired |
| Alexis Vuillermoz | Total Direct Énergie |

== Season victories ==
| Date | Race | Competition | Rider | Country | Location | Ref. |
|---|---|---|---|---|---|---|
| 31 January | Grand Prix La Marseillaise | UCI Europe Tour | Aurélien Paret-Peintre (FRA) | France | Marseille | |
| 27 February | UAE Tour, Sprints classification | UCI World Tour | Tony Gallopin (FRA) | United Arab Emirates | | |
| 20 May | Giro d'Italia, Stage 12 | UCI World Tour | Andrea Vendrame (ITA) | Italy | Bagno di Romagna | |
| 30 May | Giro d'Italia, Mountains classification | UCI World Tour | Geoffrey Bouchard (FRA) | Italy | | |
| 10 June | Route d'Occitanie, Stage 1 | UCI Europe Tour | Andrea Vendrame (ITA) | France | Lacaune-les-Bains | |
| 13 June | Route d'Occitanie, Points classification | UCI Europe Tour | Andrea Vendrame (ITA) | France | | |
| 15 June | Paris–Camembert | UCI Europe Tour | Dorian Godon (FRA) | France | Camembert | |
| 4 July | Tour de France, Stage 9 | UCI World Tour | Ben O'Connor (AUS) | France | Tignes | |
| 18 August | Tour du Limousin, Stage 2 | UCI Europe Tour | Dorian Godon (FRA) | France | Payzac | |
| 29 August | Bretagne Classic Ouest–France | UCI World Tour | Benoît Cosnefroy (FRA) | France | Ploauy | |
| 4 September | Tour du Jura | UCI Europe Tour | Benoît Cosnefroy (FRA) | France | Lons-le-Saunier | |
| 4 September | Vuelta a España, Stage 20 | UCI World Tour | Clément Champoussin (FRA) | Spain | Mos (Castro de Herville) | |
| 5 September | Tour du Doubs | UCI Europe Tour | Dorian Godon (FRA) | France | Pontarlier | |
| 17 October | Boucles de l'Aulne | UCI Europe Tour | Stan Dewulf (BEL) | France | Châteaulin | |
