= Umberto Marengo =

Italian racing cyclist

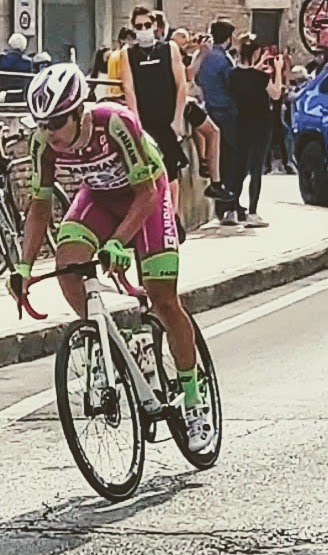

Personal information
- Born: 21 July 1992 (age 34) Giaveno, Italy
- Height: 1.78 m (5 ft 10 in)
- Weight: 65 kg (143 lb)

Cycling career
- Sport: Cycling
- Discipline: Road
- Role: Rider

Amateur teams
- 2011: Aurora Sport
- 2012–2014: GS Podenzano
- 2015: General Store Bottoli Zardini
- 2016: Overall
- 2017: Delio Gallina Colosio Eurofeed
- 2018: Viris L&L Sisal Matchpoint

Professional teams
- 2019–2020: Neri Sottoli–Selle Italia–KTM
- 2021: Bardiani–CSF–Faizanè
- 2022: Drone Hopper–Androni Giocattoli

Umberto Marengo (born 21 July 1992 in Giaveno) is an Italian cyclist, who last rode for UCI ProTeam GW Erco SportFitness.

== Major results ==
2013
9th Coppa della Pace
2017
Challenge du Prince

1st Trophée de l'Anniversaire
8th Trophée Princier

Les Challenges de la Marche Verte

2nd GP Sakia El Hamra
4th GP Oued Eddahab
5th GP Al Massira

5th Giro del Medio Brenta
7th Overall Tour du Maroc
2018
6th Trofeo Città di Brescia
9th Trofeo Alcide Degasperi
2019
1st Stage 1 Tour of Utah
5th Overall Tour of Taiyuan
10th Coppa Bernocchi

=== Grand Tour general classification results timeline ===
Grand Tour	2021
Giro d'Italia	139
Tour de France	—
Vuelta a España	—

Legend
—	Did not compete
DNF	Did not finish
