= Samuele Rivi =

Italian cyclist (born 1998)

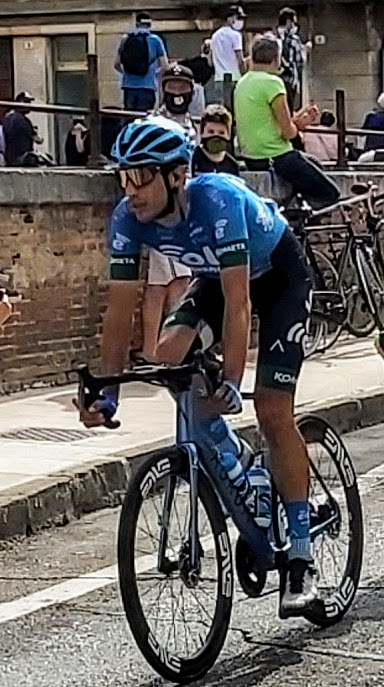
- Rivi at the 2021 Giro d'Italia

Personal information
- Born: 11 May 1998 (age 28) Trento, Italy
- Height: 1.87 m (6 ft 2 in)
- Weight: 72 kg (159 lb)

Cycling career
- Sport: Cycling
- Discipline: Road
- Role: Rider

Amateur teams
- 2011–2012: Aurora PVB
- 2014: Forti e Veloci
- 2015–2016: Pavoncelli Ausonia
- 2017–2018: Viris Maserati–Sisal–Matchpoint

Professional teams
- 2019–2020: Tirol KTM Cycling Team
- 2021–2023: Eolo–Kometa

Samuele Rivi (born 11 May 1998) is an Italian racing cyclist, who most recently rode for UCI ProTeam Eolo–Kometa.

== Major results ==
2018
8th Trofeo Città di San Vendemiano
2019
1st Grand Prix Südkärnten
2nd Trofeo Piva
6th Gran Premio Industrie del Marmo
8th GP Slovenian Istria
2021
8th Trofeo Matteotti
2023
1st Stage 3a Tour Poitou-Charentes en Nouvelle-Aquitaine

=== Grand Tour general classification results timeline ===
Grand Tour	2021	2022
Giro d'Italia	129	126
Tour de France	—	—
Vuelta a España	—	—

Legend
—	Did not compete
DNF	Did not finish
