= Geoffrey Bouchard =

French cyclist (born 1992)

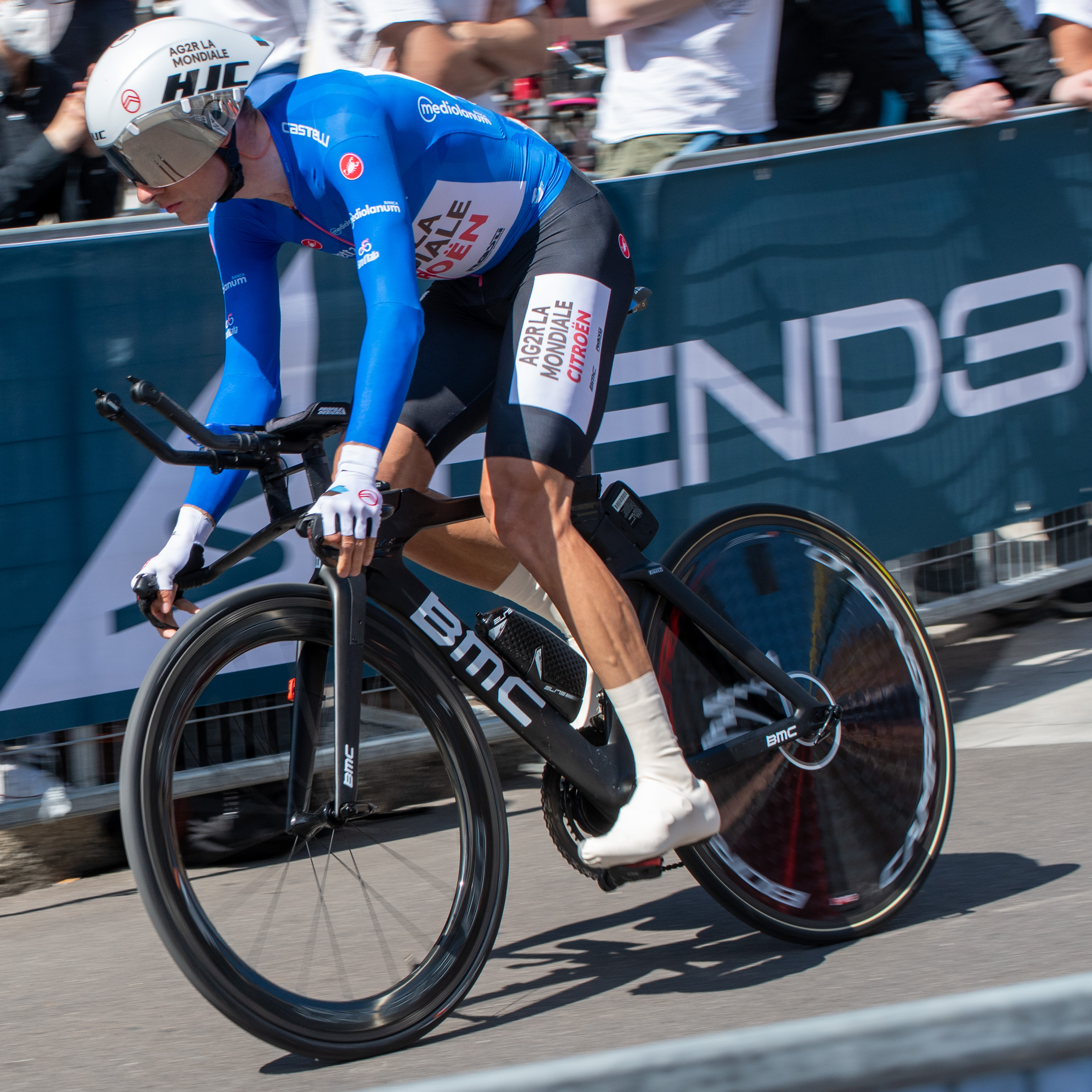
- Bouchard at the 2021 Giro d'Italia

Personal information
- Born: 1 April 1992 (age 34) Dijon, France
- Height: 1.77 m (5 ft 10 in)
- Weight: 64 kg (141 lb)

Cycling career
- Sport: Cycling
- Current team: Team TotalEnergies
- Discipline: Road
- Role: Rider
- Rider type: Climber

Amateur teams
- 2009–2010: UC Voiron
- 2011–2014: Vulco-VC Vaulx-en-Velin
- 2015–2018: CR4C Roanne
- 2018: AG2R La Mondiale (stagiaire)

Professional teams
- 2019–2025: AG2R La Mondiale
- 2026–: Team TotalEnergies

Major wins
- Grand Tours Giro d'Italia Mountains classification (2021) Vuelta a España Mountains classification (2019)

Geoffrey Bouchard (born 1 April 1992) is a French cyclist, who currently rides for UCI ProTeam Team TotalEnergies.

In August 2019, he was named in the startlist for the 2019 Vuelta a España. He took over the lead in the King of the Mountains competition following stage 16 and would hold this lead for the remainder of the race. In October 2020, he was named in the startlist for the 2020 Giro d'Italia. He would also start the Giro the following year, and in May 2021 he became the first French rider to win the mountains classification in the Giro since Laurent Fignon in 1984.

== Major results ==
2018
1st Road race, National Amateur Road Championships
1st Overall Tour Alsace

1st Stage 2

3rd Tour du Gévaudan Occitanie
2019
Vuelta a España

1st Mountains classification
Combativity award Stage 9

2021
1st Mountains classification, Giro d'Italia
3rd Paris–Camembert
9th Overall Vuelta a Burgos
10th Mont Ventoux Dénivelé Challenge
2022
1st Stage 1 Tour of the Alps
4th Paris–Camembert
8th Overall UAE Tour
2023
3rd Overall Tour of Oman
2025
8th Overall Tour de l'Ain

=== Grand Tour general classification results timeline ===
Grand Tour	2019	2020	2021	2022	2023	2024	2025
Giro d'Italia	—	55	58	—	—	—	DNF
Tour de France	—	—	—	DNF	—	—	
Vuelta a España	47	—	14	—	DNF	108	

Legend
—	Did not compete
DNF	Did not finish
