= Bidard =

Bidard is a French surname. Notable people with the surname include:

- Danielle Bidard-Reydet (born 1939), French teacher and politician
- Dominique Bidard (born 1955), French weightlifter
- François Bidard (born 1992), French cyclist
- Théophile Bidard (1804–1877), French politician and law professor

== See also ==
- Bédard
