= List of teams and cyclists in the 2021 Giro d'Italia =

List of cyclists

The following is a list of teams and cyclists that took part in the 2021 Giro d'Italia.

== Teams ==
Twenty-three teams received invitations to participate in the 2021 Giro d'Italia. All nineteen UCI WorldTeams are entitled and obliged to enter the race, and they will be joined by four second-tier UCI ProTeams. Alpecin–Fenix, the best performing UCI ProTeam in 2020, received an automatic invitation, while the other three teams were selected by RCS Sport, the organizers of the Giro. Bardiani–CSF–Faizanè and Vini Zabù continue their streak of wild card invitations to the race, while Eolo–Kometa will make its Grand Tour debut. The teams were announced on 10 February 2021.

On 15 April 2021, after positive doping tests for Matteo Spreafico and Matteo De Bonis left them facing a potential suspension, Vini Zabù withdrew their participation from the race. In place of them, regular invitee Androni Giocattoli–Sidermec, which had initially been snubbed by race organizers, were awarded the last wildcard invitation.

The teams that participated in the race were:

UCI WorldTeams

- AG2R Citroën Team
- Astana–Premier Tech
- Bora–Hansgrohe
- Cofidis
- Deceuninck–Quick-Step
- EF Education–Nippo
- Groupama–FDJ
- Ineos Grenadiers
- Intermarché–Wanty–Gobert Matériaux
- Israel Start-Up Nation
- Lotto–Soudal
- Movistar Team
- Team Bahrain Victorious
- Team BikeExchange
- Team DSM
- Team Jumbo–Visma
- Team Qhubeka Assos
- Trek–Segafredo
- UAE Team Emirates

UCI ProTeams

- Alpecin–Fenix
- Androni Giocattoli–Sidermec
- Bardiani–CSF–Faizanè
- Eolo–Kometa

== Cyclists ==
Legend
No.	Starting number worn by the rider during the Giro
Pos.	Position in the general classification
Time	Deficit to the winner of the general classification
†	Denotes riders born on or after 1 January 1996 eligible for the young rider classification
General classification	Denotes the winner of the general classification
Points classification	Denotes the winner of the points classification
Mountains classification	Denotes the winner of the mountains classification
Young rider classification	Denotes the winner of the young rider classification (eligibility indicated by †)
DNS	Denotes a rider who did not start a stage, followed by the stage before which he withdrew
DNF	Denotes a rider who did not finish a stage, followed by the stage in which he withdrew
DSQ	Denotes a rider who was disqualified from the race, followed by the stage in which this occurred
HD	Denotes a rider finished outside the time limit, followed by the stage in which they did so
COV	Denotes a rider who withdrawn because of COVID-19 either because he tested positive or team members tested positive, followed by the stage before which he withdrew
Ages correct as of Saturday 8 May 2021, the date on which the Giro began

=== By starting number ===
No.	Name	Nationality	Team	Age	Pos.	Time	Ref.
1	Egan Bernal †	Colombia	Ineos Grenadiers	24	1	86h 17' 28"	
2	Jonathan Castroviejo	Spain	Ineos Grenadiers	34	23	+ 1h 18' 16"	
3	Filippo Ganna †	Italy	Ineos Grenadiers	24	118	+ 4h 47' 40"	
4	Daniel Martínez †	Colombia	Ineos Grenadiers	25	5	+ 7' 24"	
5	Gianni Moscon	Italy	Ineos Grenadiers	27	24	+ 1h 18' 17"	
6	Jhonatan Narváez †	Ecuador	Ineos Grenadiers	24	49	+ 2h 21' 53"	
7	Salvatore Puccio	Italy	Ineos Grenadiers	31	94	+ 4' 04' 23"	
8	Pavel Sivakov †	Russia	Ineos Grenadiers	23	DNS-6	–	
11	Tony Gallopin	France	AG2R Citroën Team	32	60	+ 2h 46' 05"	
12	François Bidard	France	AG2R Citroën Team	29	DNS-6	–	
13	Geoffrey Bouchard	France	AG2R Citroën Team	29	58	+ 2h 36' 35"	
14	Clément Champoussin †	France	AG2R Citroën Team	22	DNF-9	–	
15	Alexis Gougeard	France	AG2R Citroën Team	28	114	+ 4h 43' 57"	
16	Lawrence Naesen	Belgium	AG2R Citroën Team	28	119	+ 4h 47' 48"	
17	Andrea Vendrame	Italy	AG2R Citroën Team	26	50	+ 2h 23' 42"	
18	Larry Warbasse	United States	AG2R Citroën Team	30	41	+ 2h 05' 29"	
21	Tim Merlier	Belgium	Alpecin–Fenix	28	DNS-11	–	
22	Dries De Bondt	Belgium	Alpecin–Fenix	29	91	+ 4h 03' 03"	
23	Jimmy Janssens	Belgium	Alpecin–Fenix	31	65	+ 3h 15' 06"	
24	Alexander Krieger	Germany	Alpecin–Fenix	29	140	+ 5h 25' 02"	
25	Senne Leysen †	Belgium	Alpecin–Fenix	25	101	+ 4h 15' 22"	
26	Oscar Riesebeek	Netherlands	Alpecin–Fenix	28	104	+ 4h 33' 33"	
27	Gianni Vermeersch	Belgium	Alpecin–Fenix	28	87	+ 3h 52' 52"	
28	Louis Vervaeke	Belgium	Alpecin–Fenix	27	20	+ 1h 05' 19"	
31	Jefferson Alexander Cepeda †	Ecuador	Androni Giocattoli–Sidermec	22	DNS-19	–	
32	Simon Pellaud	Switzerland	Androni Giocattoli–Sidermec	28	69	+ 3h 20' 10"	
33	Andrii Ponomar †	Ukraine	Androni Giocattoli–Sidermec	18	67	+ 3h 18' 33"	
34	Simone Ravanelli	Italy	Androni Giocattoli–Sidermec	25	71	+ 3h 22' 30"	
35	Eduardo Sepúlveda	Argentina	Androni Giocattoli–Sidermec	29	47	+ 2h 20' 12"	
36	Filippo Tagliani	Italy	Androni Giocattoli–Sidermec	25	123	+ 4h 59' 05"	
37	Natnael Tesfatsion †	Eritrea	Androni Giocattoli–Sidermec	21	92	+ 4h 03' 27"	
38	Nicola Venchiarutti †	Italy	Androni Giocattoli–Sidermec	22	132	+ 5h 08' 13"	
41	Aleksandr Vlasov †	Russia	Astana–Premier Tech	25	4	+ 6' 40"	
42	Samuele Battistella †	Italy	Astana–Premier Tech	22	82	+ 3h 45' 57"	
43	Fabio Felline	Italy	Astana–Premier Tech	31	DNS-20	–	
44	Gorka Izagirre	Spain	Astana–Premier Tech	33	19	+ 1h 04' 12"	
45	Vadim Pronskiy †	Kazakhstan	Astana–Premier Tech	22	40	+ 2h 03' 59"	
46	Luis León Sánchez	Spain	Astana–Premier Tech	37	33	+ 1h 49' 52"	
47	Matteo Sobrero †	Italy	Astana–Premier Tech	23	61	+ 2h 47' 16"	
48	Harold Tejada †	Colombia	Astana–Premier Tech	24	36	+ 2h 01' 12"	
51	Mikel Landa	Spain	Team Bahrain Victorious	31	DNF-5	–	
52	Yukiya Arashiro	Japan	Team Bahrain Victorious	36	77	+ 3h 36' 24"	
53	Pello Bilbao	Spain	Team Bahrain Victorious	31	13	+ 37' 58"	
54	Damiano Caruso	Italy	Team Bahrain Victorious	33	2	+ 1' 29"	
55	Gino Mäder †	Switzerland	Team Bahrain Victorious	24	DNF-12	–	
56	Matej Mohorič	Slovenia	Team Bahrain Victorious	26	DNF-9	–	
57	Jan Tratnik	Slovenia	Team Bahrain Victorious	31	70	+ 3h 22' 28"	
58	Rafael Valls	Spain	Team Bahrain Victorious	33	96	+ 4h 04' 52"	
61	Giovanni Visconti	Italy	Bardiani–CSF–Faizanè	38	95	+ 4h 04' 45"	
62	Enrico Battaglin	Italy	Bardiani–CSF–Faizanè	31	85	+ 3h 47' 55"	
63	Giovanni Carboni	Italy	Bardiani–CSF–Faizanè	25	35	+ 2h 00' 45"	
64	Filippo Fiorelli	Italy	Bardiani–CSF–Faizanè	26	108	+ 4h 36' 05"	
65	Davide Gabburo	Italy	Bardiani–CSF–Faizanè	28	106	+ 4h 35' 44"	
66	Umberto Marengo	Italy	Bardiani–CSF–Faizanè	28	139	+ 5h 19' 06"	
67	Filippo Zana †	Italy	Bardiani–CSF–Faizanè	22	73	+ 3h 28' 45"	
68	Samuele Zoccarato †	Italy	Bardiani–CSF–Faizanè	23	105	+ 4h 33' 49"	
71	Peter Sagan	Slovakia	Bora–Hansgrohe	31	117	+ 4h 46' 24"	
72	Giovanni Aleotti †	Italy	Bora–Hansgrohe	21	80	+ 3h 40' 28"	
73	Cesare Benedetti	Italy	Bora–Hansgrohe	33	103	+ 4h 26' 44"	
74	Maciej Bodnar	Poland	Bora–Hansgrohe	36	136	+ 5h 14' 42"	
75	Emanuel Buchmann	Germany	Bora–Hansgrohe	28	DNF-15	–	
76	Matteo Fabbro	Italy	Bora–Hansgrohe	26	32	+ 1h 49' 23"	
77	Felix Großschartner	Austria	Bora–Hansgrohe	27	42	+ 2h 12' 10"	
78	Daniel Oss	Italy	Bora–Hansgrohe	34	112	+ 4h 42' 49"	
81	Elia Viviani	Italy	Cofidis	32	135	+ 5h 12' 15"	
82	Natnael Berhane	Eritrea	Cofidis	30	DNF-15	–	
83	Simone Consonni	Italy	Cofidis	26	110	+ 4h 38' 16"	
84	Nicolas Edet	France	Cofidis	33	DNF-14	–	
85	Victor Lafay †	France	Cofidis	25	DNS-19	–	
86	Rémy Rochas †	France	Cofidis	24	DNF-17	–	
87	Fabio Sabatini	Italy	Cofidis	36	133	+ 5h 09' 16"	
88	Attilio Viviani †	Italy	Cofidis	24	142	+ 5h 29' 40"	
91	Remco Evenepoel †	Belgium	Deceuninck–Quick-Step	21	DNS-18	–	
92	João Almeida †	Portugal	Deceuninck–Quick-Step	22	6	+ 7' 24"	
93	Rémi Cavagna	France	Deceuninck–Quick-Step	25	68	+ 3h 19' 43"	
94	Mikkel Frølich Honoré †	Denmark	Deceuninck–Quick-Step	24	81	+ 3h 41' 43"	
95	Iljo Keisse	Belgium	Deceuninck–Quick-Step	38	121	+ 4h 50' 45"	
96	James Knox	Great Britain	Deceuninck–Quick-Step	25	53	+ 2h 29' 17"	
97	Fausto Masnada	Italy	Deceuninck–Quick-Step	27	DNF-12	–	
98	Pieter Serry	Belgium	Deceuninck–Quick-Step	32	56	+ 2h 30' 40"	
101	Hugh Carthy	Great Britain	EF Education–Nippo	26	8	+ 8' 56"	
102	Jonathan Caicedo	Ecuador	EF Education–Nippo	28	DNF-11	–	
103	Simon Carr †	Great Britain	EF Education–Nippo	22	66	+ 3h 18' 32"	
104	Ruben Guerreiro	Portugal	EF Education–Nippo	26	DNF-15	–	
105	Jens Keukeleire	Belgium	EF Education–Nippo	32	78	+ 3h 37' 24"	
106	Julius van den Berg †	Netherlands	EF Education–Nippo	24	125	+ 5h 00' 11"	
107	Alberto Bettiol	Italy	EF Education–Nippo	27	30	+ 1h 43' 43"	
109	Tejay van Garderen	United States	EF Education–Nippo	32	84	+ 3h 46' 16"	
111	Manuel Belletti	Italy	Eolo–Kometa	35	DNF-6	–	
112	Vincenzo Albanese †	Italy	Eolo–Kometa	24	75	+ 3h 34' 13"	
113	Mark Christian	Great Britain	Eolo–Kometa	30	76	+ 3h 35' 44"	
114	Márton Dina †	Hungary	Eolo–Kometa	25	100	+ 4h 11' 55"	
115	Lorenzo Fortunato †	Italy	Eolo–Kometa	24	16	+ 47' 31"	
116	Francesco Gavazzi	Italy	Eolo–Kometa	36	29	+ 1h 40' 19"	
117	Edward Ravasi	Italy	Eolo–Kometa	26	46	+ 2h 18' 40"	
118	Samuele Rivi †	Italy	Eolo–Kometa	22	129	+ 5h 02' 59"	
121	Rudy Molard	France	Groupama–FDJ	31	37	+ 2h 02' 01"	
122	Matteo Badilatti	Switzerland	Groupama–FDJ	28	34	+ 1h 51' 47"	
123	Antoine Duchesne	Canada	Groupama–FDJ	29	115	+ 4h 43' 58"	
124	Simon Guglielmi †	France	Groupama–FDJ	23	90	+ 3h 59' 46"	
125	Sébastien Reichenbach	Switzerland	Groupama–FDJ	31	DNF-16	–	
126	Romain Seigle	France	Groupama–FDJ	26	88	+ 3h 55' 23"	
127	Attila Valter †	Hungary	Groupama–FDJ	22	14	+ 45' 30"	
128	Lars van den Berg †	Netherlands	Groupama–FDJ	22	64	+ 3h 13' 49"	
131	Jan Hirt	Czechia	Intermarché–Wanty–Gobert Matériaux	30	26	+ 1h 32' 42"	
132	Quinten Hermans	Belgium	Intermarché–Wanty–Gobert Matériaux	25	43	+ 2h 13' 57"	
133	Wesley Kreder	Netherlands	Intermarché–Wanty–Gobert Matériaux	30	128	+ 5h 02' 43"	
134	Riccardo Minali	Italy	Intermarché–Wanty–Gobert Matériaux	26	143	+ 5h 35' 49"	
135	Andrea Pasqualon	Italy	Intermarché–Wanty–Gobert Matériaux	33	72	+ 3h 23' 57"	
136	Simone Petilli	Italy	Intermarché–Wanty–Gobert Matériaux	28	44	+ 2h 14' 12"	
137	Rein Taaramäe	Estonia	Intermarché–Wanty–Gobert Matériaux	34	51	+ 2h 24' 46"	
138	Taco van der Hoorn	Netherlands	Intermarché–Wanty–Gobert Matériaux	27	107	+ 4h 35' 49"	
141	Dan Martin	Ireland	Israel Start-Up Nation	34	10	+ 18' 35"	
142	Patrick Bevin	New Zealand	Israel Start-Up Nation	30	48	+ 2h 21' 29"	
143	Matthias Brändle	Austria	Israel Start-Up Nation	31	130	+ 5h 03' 34"	
144	Davide Cimolai	Italy	Israel Start-Up Nation	31	127	+ 5h 02' 16"	
145	Alessandro De Marchi	Italy	Israel Start-Up Nation	34	DNF-12	–	
146	Alex Dowsett	Great Britain	Israel Start-Up Nation	32	DNF-12	–	
147	Krists Neilands	Latvia	Israel Start-Up Nation	26	DNS-2	–	
148	Guy Niv	Israel	Israel Start-Up Nation	27	74	+ 3h 33' 32"	
151	George Bennett	New Zealand	Team Jumbo–Visma	31	11	+ 25' 35"	
152	Edoardo Affini †	Italy	Team Jumbo–Visma	24	113	+ 4h 43' 51"	
153	Koen Bouwman	Netherlands	Team Jumbo–Visma	27	12	+ 30' 56"	
154	David Dekker †	Netherlands	Team Jumbo–Visma	23	DNS-14	–	
155	Tobias Foss †	Norway	Team Jumbo–Visma	23	9	+ 11' 44"	
156	Dylan Groenewegen	Netherlands	Team Jumbo–Visma	27	DNS-14	–	
157	Paul Martens	Germany	Team Jumbo–Visma	37	99	+ 4h 09' 07"	
158	Jos van Emden	Netherlands	Team Jumbo–Visma	36	DNF-15	–	
161	Caleb Ewan	Australia	Lotto–Soudal	26	DNF-8	–	
162	Jasper De Buyst	Belgium	Lotto–Soudal	27	DNF-9	–	
163	Thomas De Gendt	Belgium	Lotto–Soudal	34	DNS-16	–	
164	Kobe Goossens †	Belgium	Lotto–Soudal	25	DNF-12	–	
165	Roger Kluge	Germany	Lotto–Soudal	35	DNF-14	–	
166	Tomasz Marczyński	Poland	Lotto–Soudal	37	DNS-9	–	
167	Stefano Oldani †	Italy	Lotto–Soudal	23	79	+ 3h 39' 11"	
168	Harm Vanhoucke †	Belgium	Lotto–Soudal	23	86	+ 3h 49' 07"	
171	Marc Soler	Spain	Movistar Team	27	DNF-12	–	
172	Dario Cataldo	Italy	Movistar Team	36	54	+ 2h 29' 24"	
173	Matteo Jorgenson †	United States	Movistar Team	21	98	+ 4h 05' 48"	
174	Nelson Oliveira	Portugal	Movistar Team	32	27	+ 1h 36' 27"	
175	Antonio Pedrero	Spain	Movistar Team	29	22	+ 1h 07' 50"	
176	Einer Rubio †	Colombia	Movistar Team	23	39	+ 2h 03' 56"	
177	Albert Torres	Spain	Movistar Team	31	138	+ 5h 17' 26"	
178	Davide Villella	Italy	Movistar Team	29	55	+ 2h 29' 51"	
181	Simon Yates	Great Britain	Team BikeExchange	28	3	+ 4' 15"	
182	Michael Hepburn	Australia	Team BikeExchange	29	120	+ 4h 47' 58"	
183	Christopher Juul-Jensen	Denmark	Team BikeExchange	31	97	+ 4h 05' 47"	
184	Tanel Kangert	Estonia	Team BikeExchange	34	21	+ 1h 07' 25"	
185	Cameron Meyer	Australia	Team BikeExchange	33	111	+ 4h 38' 42"	
186	Mikel Nieve	Spain	Team BikeExchange	36	25	+ 1h 20' 58"	
187	Nick Schultz	Australia	Team BikeExchange	26	DNS-18	–	
188	Callum Scotson †	Australia	Team BikeExchange	24	83	+ 3h 46' 05"	
191	Jai Hindley †	Australia	Team DSM	25	DNS-14	–	
192	Nikias Arndt	Germany	Team DSM	29	62	+ 2h 56' 04"	
193	Romain Bardet	France	Team DSM	30	7	+ 8' 05"	
194	Nico Denz	Germany	Team DSM	27	102	+ 4h 16' 02"	
195	Chris Hamilton	Australia	Team DSM	25	45	+ 2h 17' 55"	
196	Max Kanter †	Germany	Team DSM	23	116	+ 4h 46' 24"	
197	Nicolas Roche	Ireland	Team DSM	36	59	+ 2h 41' 13"	
198	Michael Storer †	Australia	Team DSM	24	31	+ 1h 49' 05"	
201	Giacomo Nizzolo	Italy	Team Qhubeka Assos	32	DNS-15	–	
202	Victor Campenaerts	Belgium	Team Qhubeka Assos	29	DNS-17	–	
203	Kilian Frankiny	Switzerland	Team Qhubeka Assos	27	57	+ 2h 34' 36"	
204	Bert-Jan Lindeman	Netherlands	Team Qhubeka Assos	31	122	+ 4h 58' 29"	
205	Domenico Pozzovivo	Italy	Team Qhubeka Assos	38	DNS-7	–	
206	Mauro Schmid †	Switzerland	Team Qhubeka Assos	21	93	+ 4h 03' 47"	
207	Max Walscheid	Germany	Team Qhubeka Assos	27	124	+ 4h 59' 37"	
208	Łukasz Wiśniowski	Poland	Team Qhubeka Assos	29	131	+ 5h 08' 11"	
211	Vincenzo Nibali	Italy	Trek–Segafredo	36	18	+ 1h 03' 59"	
212	Gianluca Brambilla	Italy	Trek–Segafredo	33	DNF-19	–	
213	Giulio Ciccone	Italy	Trek–Segafredo	26	DNS-18	–	
214	Koen de Kort	Netherlands	Trek–Segafredo	38	134	+ 5h 11' 05"	
215	Amanuel Ghebreigzabhier	Eritrea	Trek–Segafredo	26	63	+ 2h 59' 03"	
216	Bauke Mollema	Netherlands	Trek–Segafredo	34	28	+ 1h 36' 47"	
217	Jacopo Mosca	Italy	Trek–Segafredo	27	52	+ 2h 27' 00"	
218	Matteo Moschetti †	Italy	Trek–Segafredo	24	141	+ 5h 29' 21"	
221	Davide Formolo	Italy	UAE Team Emirates	28	15	+ 47' 21"	
222	Valerio Conti	Italy	UAE Team Emirates	28	89	+ 3h 58' 45"	
223	Alessandro Covi †	Italy	UAE Team Emirates	22	38	+ 2h 03' 30"	
224	Joe Dombrowski	United States	UAE Team Emirates	29	DNS-6	–	
225	Fernando Gaviria	Colombia	UAE Team Emirates	26	109	+ 4h 37' 48"	
226	Juan Sebastián Molano	Colombia	UAE Team Emirates	26	126	+ 5h 01' 04"	
227	Maximiliano Richeze	Argentina	UAE Team Emirates	38	137	+ 5h 17' 22"	
228	Diego Ulissi	Italy	UAE Team Emirates	31	17	+ 56' 32"	

=== By team ===
Ineos Grenadiers (IGD)
No.	Rider	Pos.
1	Egan Bernal (COL)	1
2	Jonathan Castroviejo (ESP)	23
3	Filippo Ganna (ITA)	118
4	Daniel Martínez (COL)	5
5	Gianni Moscon (ITA)	24
6	Jhonatan Narváez (ECU)	49
7	Salvatore Puccio (ITA)	94
8	Pavel Sivakov (RUS)	DNS-6

AG2R Citroën Team (ALM)
No.	Rider	Pos.
11	Tony Gallopin (FRA)	60
12	François Bidard (FRA)	DNS-6
13	Geoffrey Bouchard (FRA)	58
14	Clément Champoussin (FRA)	DNF-9
15	Alexis Gougeard (FRA)	114
16	Lawrence Naesen (BEL)	119
17	Andrea Vendrame (ITA)	50
18	Larry Warbasse (USA)	41

Alpecin–Fenix (AFC)
No.	Rider	Pos.
21	Tim Merlier (BEL)	DNS-11
22	Dries De Bondt (BEL)	91
23	Jimmy Janssens (BEL)	65
24	Alexander Krieger (GER)	140
25	Senne Leysen (BEL)	101
26	Oscar Riesebeek (NED)	104
27	Gianni Vermeersch (BEL)	87
28	Louis Vervaeke (BEL)	20

Androni Giocattoli–Sidermec (ANS)
No.	Rider	Pos.
31	Jefferson Alexander Cepeda (ECU)	DNS-19
32	Simon Pellaud (SUI)	69
33	Andrii Ponomar (UKR)	67
34	Simone Ravanelli (ITA)	71
35	Eduardo Sepúlveda (ARG)	47
36	Filippo Tagliani (ITA)	123
37	Natnael Tesfatsion (ERI)	92
38	Nicola Venchiarutti (ITA)	132

Astana–Premier Tech (APT)
No.	Rider	Pos.
41	Aleksandr Vlasov (RUS)	4
42	Samuele Battistella (ITA)	82
43	Fabio Felline (ITA)	DNS-20
44	Gorka Izagirre (ESP)	19
45	Vadim Pronskiy (KAZ)	40
46	Luis León Sánchez (ESP)	33
47	Matteo Sobrero (ITA)	61
48	Harold Tejada (COL)	36

Team Bahrain Victorious (TBV)
No.	Rider	Pos.
51	Mikel Landa (ESP)	DNF-5
52	Yukiya Arashiro (JPN)	77
53	Pello Bilbao (ESP)	13
54	Damiano Caruso (ITA)	2
55	Gino Mäder (SUI)	DNF-12
56	Matej Mohorič (SLO)	DNF-9
57	Jan Tratnik (SLO)	70
58	Rafael Valls (ESP)	96

Bardiani–CSF–Faizanè (BCF)
No.	Rider	Pos.
61	Giovanni Visconti (ITA)	95
62	Enrico Battaglin (ITA)	85
63	Giovanni Carboni (ITA)	35
64	Filippo Fiorelli (ITA)	108
65	Davide Gabburo (ITA)	106
66	Umberto Marengo (ITA)	139
67	Filippo Zana (ITA)	73
68	Samuele Zoccarato (ITA)	105

Bora–Hansgrohe (BOH)
No.	Rider	Pos.
71	Peter Sagan (SVK)	117
72	Giovanni Aleotti (ITA)	80
73	Cesare Benedetti (ITA)	103
74	Maciej Bodnar (POL)	136
75	Emanuel Buchmann (GER)	DNF-15
76	Matteo Fabbro (ITA)	32
77	Felix Großschartner (AUT)	42
78	Daniel Oss (ITA)	112

Cofidis (COF)
No.	Rider	Pos.
81	Elia Viviani (ITA)	135
82	Natnael Berhane (ERI)	DNF-15
83	Simone Consonni (ITA)	110
84	Nicolas Edet (FRA)	DNF-14
85	Victor Lafay (FRA)	DNS-19
86	Rémy Rochas (FRA)	DNF-17
87	Fabio Sabatini (ITA)	133
88	Attilio Viviani (ITA)	142

Deceuninck–Quick-Step (DQT)
No.	Rider	Pos.
91	Remco Evenepoel (BEL)	DNS-18
92	João Almeida (POR)	6
93	Rémi Cavagna (FRA)	68
94	Mikkel Frølich Honoré (DEN)	81
95	Iljo Keisse (BEL)	121
96	James Knox (GBR)	53
97	Fausto Masnada (ITA)	DNF-12
98	Pieter Serry (BEL)	56

EF Education–Nippo (EFN)
No.	Rider	Pos.
101	Hugh Carthy (GBR)	8
102	Alberto Bettiol (ITA)	30
103	Jonathan Caicedo (ECU)	DNF-11
104	Simon Carr (GBR)	66
105	Ruben Guerreiro (POR)	DNF-15
106	Jens Keukeleire (BEL)	78
107	Julius van den Berg (NED)	125
109	Tejay van Garderen (USA)	84

Eolo–Kometa (EOK)
No.	Rider	Pos.
111	Manuel Belletti (ITA)	DNF-6
112	Vincenzo Albanese (ITA)	75
113	Mark Christian (GBR)	76
114	Márton Dina (HUN)	100
115	Lorenzo Fortunato (ITA)	16
116	Francesco Gavazzi (ITA)	29
117	Edward Ravasi (ITA)	46
118	Samuele Rivi (ITA)	129

Groupama–FDJ (GFC)
No.	Rider	Pos.
121	Rudy Molard (FRA)	37
122	Matteo Badilatti (SUI)	34
123	Antoine Duchesne (CAN)	115
124	Simon Guglielmi (FRA)	90
125	Sébastien Reichenbach (SUI)	DNF-16
126	Romain Seigle (FRA)	88
127	Attila Valter (HUN)	14
128	Lars van den Berg (NED)	64

Intermarché–Wanty–Gobert Matériaux (IWG)
No.	Rider	Pos.
131	Jan Hirt (CZE)	26
132	Quinten Hermans (BEL)	43
133	Wesley Kreder (NED)	128
134	Riccardo Minali (ITA)	143
135	Andrea Pasqualon (ITA)	72
136	Simone Petilli (ITA)	44
137	Rein Taaramäe (EST)	51
138	Taco van der Hoorn (NED)	107

Israel Start-Up Nation (ISN)
No.	Rider	Pos.
141	Dan Martin (IRL)	10
142	Patrick Bevin (NZL)	48
143	Matthias Brändle (AUT)	127
144	Davide Cimolai (ITA)	130
145	Alessandro De Marchi (ITA)	DNF-12
146	Alex Dowsett (GBR)	DNF-12
147	Krists Neilands (LAT)	DNS-2
148	Guy Niv (ISR)	74

Team Jumbo–Visma (TJV)
No.	Rider	Pos.
151	George Bennett (NZL)	11
152	Edoardo Affini (ITA)	113
153	Koen Bouwman (NED)	12
154	David Dekker (NED)	DNS-14
155	Tobias Foss (NOR)	9
156	Dylan Groenewegen (NED)	DNS-14
157	Paul Martens (GER)	99
158	Jos van Emden (NED)	DNF-15

Lotto–Soudal (LTS)
No.	Rider	Pos.
161	Caleb Ewan (AUS)	DNF-8
162	Jasper De Buyst (BEL)	DNF-9
163	Thomas De Gendt (BEL)	DNS-16
164	Kobe Goossens (BEL)	DNF-12
165	Roger Kluge (GER)	DNF-14
166	Tomasz Marczyński (POL)	DNS-9
167	Stefano Oldani (ITA)	79
168	Harm Vanhoucke (BEL)	86

Movistar Team (MOV)
No.	Rider	Pos.
171	Marc Soler (ESP)	DNF-12
172	Dario Cataldo (ITA)	54
173	Matteo Jorgenson (USA)	98
174	Nelson Oliveira (POR)	27
175	Antonio Pedrero (ESP)	22
176	Einer Rubio (COL)	39
177	Albert Torres (ESP)	138
178	Davide Villella (ITA)	55

Team BikeExchange (BEX)
No.	Rider	Pos.
181	Simon Yates (GBR)	3
182	Michael Hepburn (AUS)	120
183	Christopher Juul-Jensen (DEN)	97
184	Tanel Kangert (EST)	21
185	Cameron Meyer (AUS)	111
186	Mikel Nieve (ESP)	25
187	Nick Schultz (AUS)	DNS-18
188	Callum Scotson (AUS)	83

Team DSM (DSM)
No.	Rider	Pos.
191	Jai Hindley (AUS)	DNS-14
192	Nikias Arndt (GER)	62
193	Romain Bardet (FRA)	7
194	Nico Denz (GER)	102
195	Chris Hamilton (AUS)	45
196	Max Kanter (GER)	116
197	Nicolas Roche (IRL)	59
198	Michael Storer (AUS)	31

Team Qhubeka Assos (TQA)
No.	Rider	Pos.
201	Giacomo Nizzolo (ITA)	DNS-15
202	Victor Campenaerts (BEL)	DNS-17
203	Kilian Frankiny (SUI)	57
204	Bert-Jan Lindeman (NED)	122
205	Domenico Pozzovivo (ITA)	DNS-7
206	Mauro Schmid (SUI)	93
207	Max Walscheid (GER)	124
208	Łukasz Wiśniowski (POL)	131

Trek–Segafredo (TFS)
No.	Rider	Pos.
211	Vincenzo Nibali (ITA)	18
212	Gianluca Brambilla (ITA)	DNF-19
213	Giulio Ciccone (ITA)	DNS-18
214	Koen de Kort (NED)	134
215	Amanuel Ghebreigzabhier (ERI)	63
216	Bauke Mollema (NED)	28
217	Jacopo Mosca (ITA)	52
218	Matteo Moschetti (ITA)	141

UAE Team Emirates (UAD)
No.	Rider	Pos.
221	Davide Formolo (ITA)	15
222	Valerio Conti (ITA)	89
223	Alessandro Covi (ITA)	38
224	Joe Dombrowski (USA)	DNS-6
225	Fernando Gaviria (COL)	109
226	Juan Sebastián Molano (COL)	126
227	Maximiliano Richeze (ARG)	137
228	Diego Ulissi (ITA)	17

=== By nationality ===
Country	No. of riders	Finishers	Stage wins
Argentina	2	2	
Australia	8	5	2 (Caleb Ewan x2)
Austria	2	2	
Belgium	17	11	2 (Victor Campenaerts, Tim Merlier)
Canada	1	1	
Colombia	6	6	2 (Egan Bernal x2)
Czechia	1	1	
Denmark	2	2	
Ecuador	3	1	
Eritrea	3	2	
Estonia	2	2	
France	13	8	1 (Victor Lafay)
Germany	8	6	
Great Britain	6	5	1 (Simon Yates)
Hungary	2	2	
Ireland	2	2	1 (Dan Martin)
Israel	1	1	
Italy	55	47	7 (Alberto Bettiol, Damiano Caruso, Lorenzo Fortunato, Filippo Ganna x2, Giacomo Nizzolo, Andrea Vendrame)
Japan	1	1	
Kazakhstan	1	1	
Latvia	1	0	
Netherlands	12	9	1 (Taco van der Hoorn)
New Zealand	2	2	
Norway	1	1	
Poland	3	2	
Portugal	3	2	
Russia	2	1	
Slovakia	1	1	1 (Peter Sagan)
Slovenia	2	1	
Spain	10	8	
Switzerland	6	4	2 (Gino Mäder, Mauro Schmid)
Ukraine	1	1	
United States	4	3	1 (Joe Dombrowski)
Total	184	143	21
