= Faustino Malaguti =

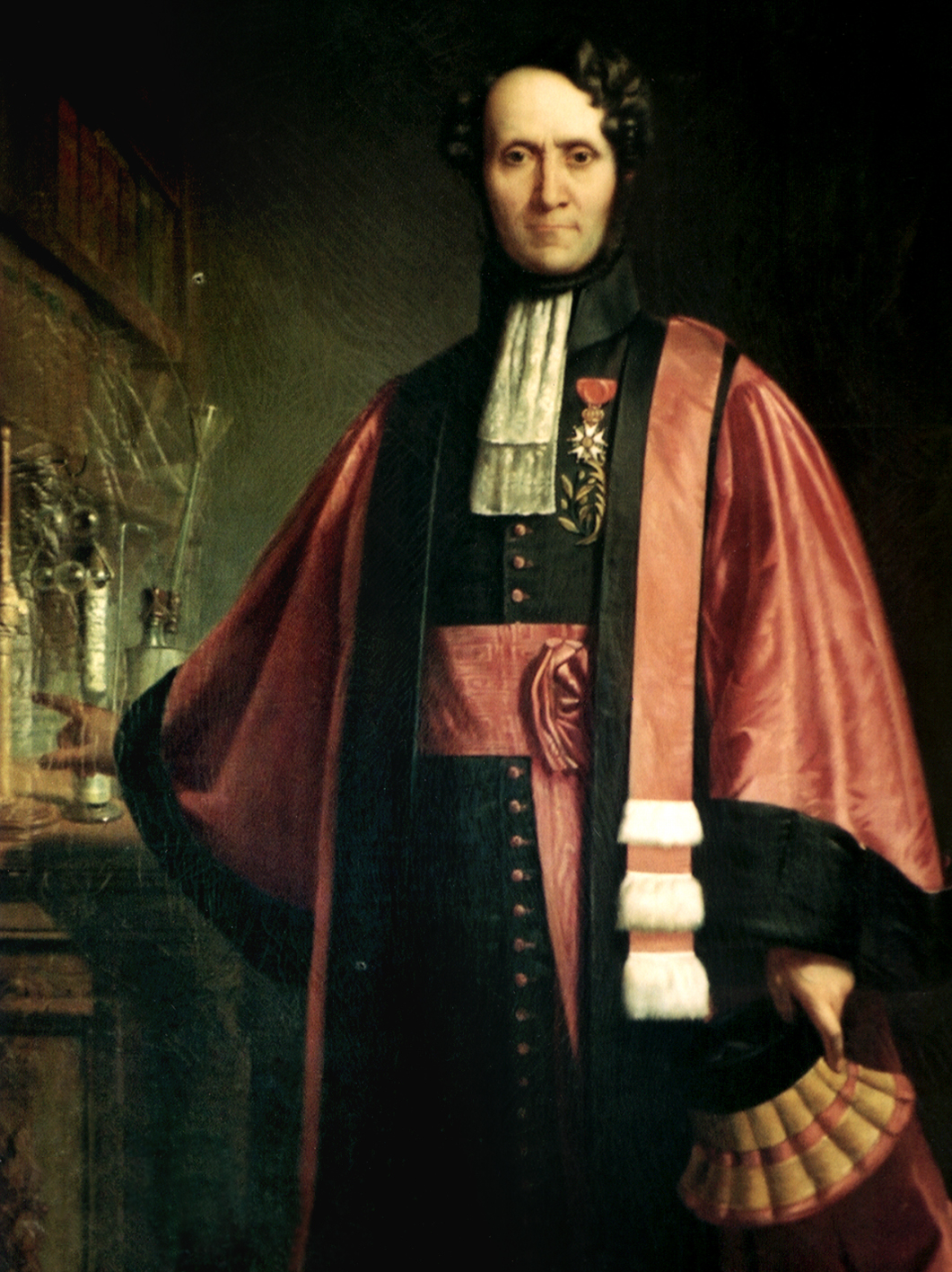
Portrait of Malaguti (unknown artist) on display at the Palais Sainte-Melaine in Rennes

Faustino Giovita Mariano Malaguti (15 February 1802 – 26 April 1878) was a chemist. Born in pre-unification Italy, he was exiled and took French citizenship in 1840.

== Biography ==
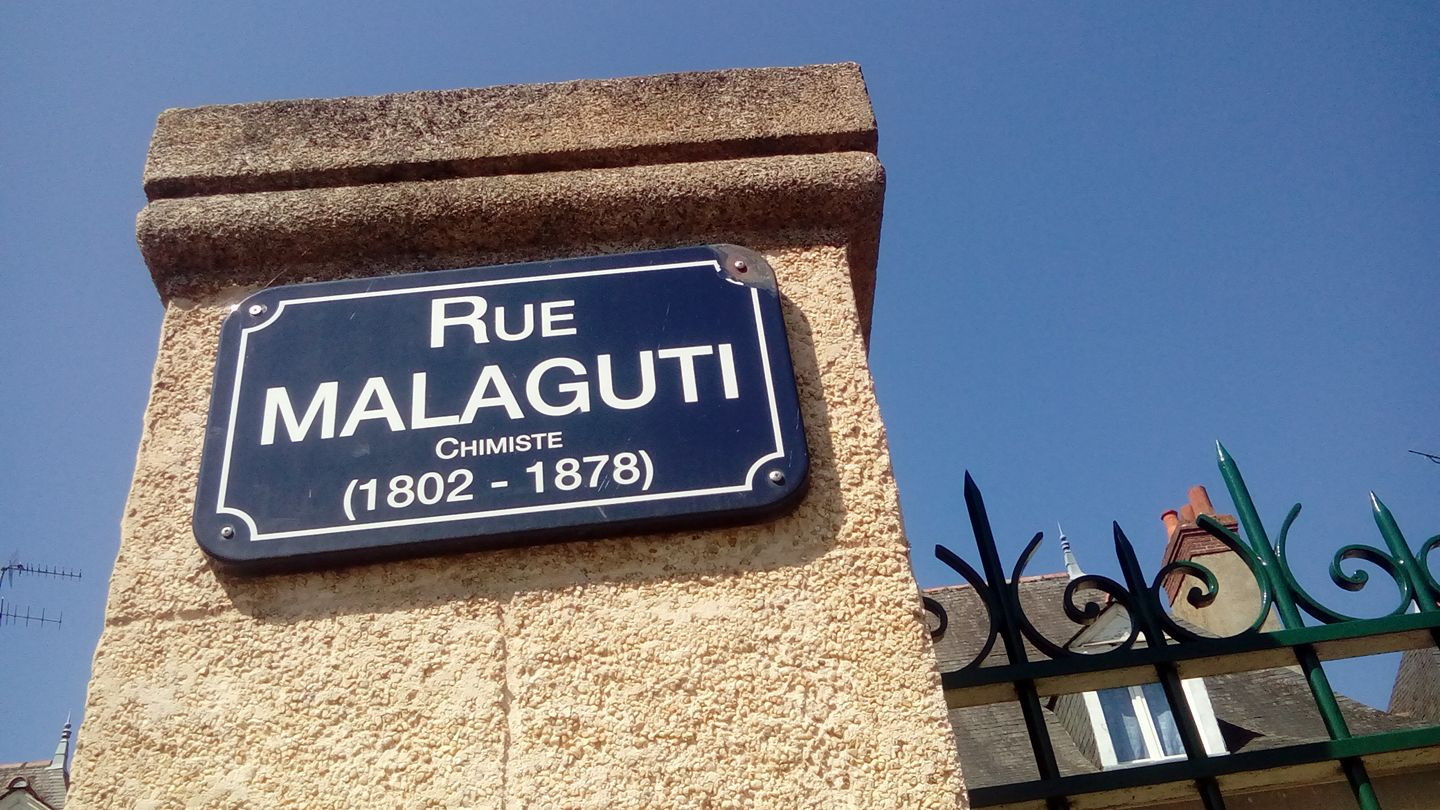
Rue Malaguti, Rennes

Malaguti was born in Pragatto near Bologna, where his father Giuseppe Valerio was a pharmacist. After being schooled by Barnabites, he attended the University of Bologna, where he qualified as a pharmacist. He practiced his profession and was also hired by customs to investigate imported medicines.

Malaguti took part in the 1831 uprising against the authority of the Papal States, being named secretary in the provisional government. After the revolution was crushed by Austria, he was imprisoned in Venice and then exiled, settling in Paris.

In 1833, Malaguti became an assistant to Théophile-Jules Pelouze at the École Polytechnique, and two years later he became a chemist at the Royal Porcelain Works in Sèvres. He wrote only two works on porcelain during his time there, instead dedicating himself to organic chemistry; he gained a doctorate in the area from Sorbonne University in 1839. In 1842, he became professor of chemistry at the University of Rennes. In 1846, he discovered 1,2-Dibromotetrachloroethane. He became the university's dean in 1855 and the rector in 1866.

Malaguti's lectures on agricultural chemistry were so highly regarded that they were subsidised by France's Ministry of Agriculture. He was an expert in the trial of the local serial killer by poison, Hélène Jégado.

After being naturalised as a French citizen in 1840, he married Fanny Megissier, with whom he had a son, Carlo. He died in Rennes on 26 April 1878, aged 76. He is buried at the Nord Cemetery in Rennes.
