= Hélène Jégado =

French serial killer (c. 1803 – 1852)

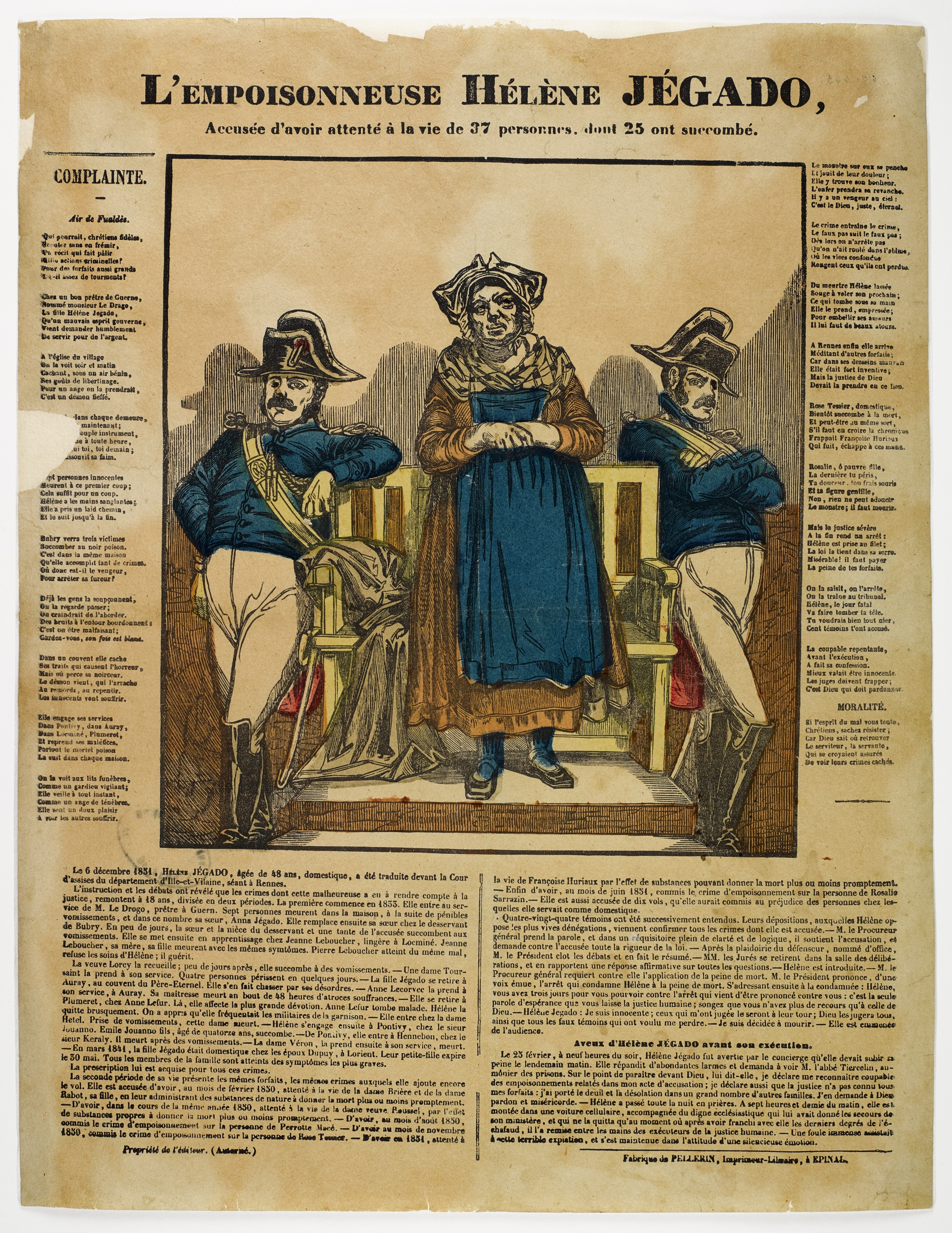
- Hélène Jégado at her trial, historical print (ca. 1851)
- Born: c. 1803; Plouhinec, Morbihan, Brittany
- Died: 26 February 1852; Rennes, Brittany
- Cause of death: Execution by guillotine
- Criminal charges: 3 murders, 3 attempted murders and 11 thefts
- Criminal penalty: Execution
- Children: Anne Jegado

Hélène Jégado (c. 1803 – 26 February 1852) was a French domestic servant and serial killer. She is believed to have murdered as many as 36 people with arsenic over a period of 18 years. After an initial period of activity, between 1833 and 1841, she seems to have stopped for nearly ten years before a final spree in 1851.

== Early life and crimes ==
Hélène Jégado was born on a small farm in Plouhinec (Morbihan), near Lorient in Brittany. She lost her mother at the age of seven and was sent to work with two aunts who were servants at the rectory of Bubry. After 17 years, she accompanied an aunt to the town of Séglien. She became a cook for the curé, where an incident arose where she was accused of adding hemp from his grain house to his soup.

Her first suspected poisoning occurred in 1833 when she was employed by another priest, Fr. François Le Drogo, in the nearby village of Guern. In the three months between 28 June and 3 October, seven members of the household died suddenly, including the priest himself, his aged mother and father, and her own visiting sister, Anne Jégado. Her apparent sorrow and pious behaviour were so convincing that she was not suspected. Coming shortly after the cholera epidemic of 1832, the deaths may have been attributed to natural causes.

Jégado returned to Bubry to replace her sister, where subsequently three people, including her other aunt, died over the course of three months, all of whom she cared for at their bedside. She relocated to Locminé, where she boarded with a needleworker, Marie-Jeanne Leboucher; both Leboucher and her daughter died and a son fell ill. It is possible that the son survived because he did not accept Jégado's ministrations. Then, in the same town, the widow Lorey offered Jégado a room; she died after eating a soup that her new boarder had prepared. In May 1835, Jégado was hired by a Madame Toussaint; four more deaths followed. By that point in time, she had already put seventeen people in their graves.

Later in 1835, Jégado was employed as a servant in a convent in Auray, but was rapidly dismissed after several incidents of vandalism and sacrilege.

Jégado worked as a cook in other households in Auray, then in Pontivy, Lorient, and Port-Louis, although she was employed only briefly in each one. Often someone fell ill or died. Among her most infamous murders was that of a child, little Marie Bréger, who died at the Château de Soye (Ploemeur) in May 1841, ten years and one month before her final arrest. Most victims died showing symptoms corresponding to arsenic poisoning, though she was never caught with arsenic in her possession. There is no record of any suspected deaths from late 1841 to 1849, although a number of her employers later reported thefts; she was apparently a kleptomaniac and was caught stealing several times.

Her career took a new turn in 1849 when she moved to Rennes, the capital city of the region.

== Arrest ==
In 1850, Jégado joined the household staff of Théophile Bidard, a law professor at the University of Rennes. One of his servants, Rose Tessier, fell ill and died when Jégado tended to her. In 1851, one of the other maids, Rosalie Sarrazin, fell ill as well and died. Two doctors had tried to save Sarrazin and because the symptoms were similar to those of Tessier, they convinced the relatives to permit an autopsy. Jégado aroused suspicion when she announced her innocence before she was even asked anything, and she was arrested on 1 July 1851.

Later inquiries linked her to 23 suspected deaths by poisoning between 1833 and 1841, but none of these were thoroughly investigated since they were outside the ten-year limit for prosecution and there was no scientific evidence. Local folklore has attributed to her many unexplained deaths, some of which were almost certainly due to natural causes. The most reliable estimate is that she probably committed about 36 murders.

== Trial ==
Jégado's trial began on 6 December 1851, but, due to French laws of permissible evidence and statute of limitations, she was accused only of three murders, three attempted murders and 11 thefts. At least one later case appears to have been dropped since it involved a child and police were reluctant to upset the parents by an exhumation. Jégado's behaviour in court was erratic, changing from humble mutterings to loud pious shouting and occasional violent outbursts against her accusers. She consistently denied she even knew what arsenic was, despite evidence to the contrary. Doctors who had examined her victims had not usually noticed anything suspicious, but when the most recent victims were exhumed, they showed overwhelming evidence of arsenic and possibly antimony.

Faustino Malaguti, a chemistry professor from the University of Rennes, was called as an expert at the trial.

The defence lawyer, Magloire Dorange, made a remarkable closing speech, arguing that she needed more time than most to repent and could be spared the death penalty since she was dying of cancer anyway.

The case attracted little attention at the time, pushed off the front pages by the coup d'état in Paris.

Jégado was sentenced to death by guillotine and executed in front of a large crowd of onlookers on the Champ-de-Mars in Rennes on 26 February 1852.

== See also ==
- List of French serial killers
