= 1,2-Dibromotetrachloroethane =

Names
- Preferred IUPAC name 1,2-Dibromo-1,1,2,2-tetrachloroethane
- Other names dibromotetrachloroethane, sym-Dibromotetrachloroethane, DBTCE, Bromure de chloréthose ("bromide of chlorethose")

Identifiers
| CAS Number | 630-25-1 |
| 3D model (JSmol) | Interactive image |
| ChemSpider | 62634 |
| ECHA InfoCard | 100.010.125 |
| EC Number | 211-136-7 |
| PubChem CID | 69426 |
| UNII | 0SGG217EFR |
| CompTox Dashboard (EPA) | DTXSID20212209 |
- InChI: InChI=1S/C2Br2Cl4/c3-1(5,6)2(4,7)8 Key: WJUKOGPNGRUXMG-UHFFFAOYSA-N
- SMILES: ClC(Cl)(Br)C(Cl)(Cl)Br

Properties
| Chemical formula | C_{2}Br_{2}Cl_{4} |
| Molar mass | 325.63 g·mol^{−1} |
| Appearance | Crystalline solid |

Hazards
- GHS labelling
| Pictograms | (GHS07: Exclamation mark) |
| Signal word | Warning |
| Hazard statements | H302, H315, H319, H335 |
| Precautionary statements | P261, P264, P264+P265, P270, P271, P280, P301+P317, P302+P352, P304+P340, P305+P351+P338, P319, P321, P330, P332+P317, P337+P317, P362+P364, P403+P233, P405, P501 |
- Except where otherwise noted, data are given for materials in their standard state (at 25 °C [77 °F], 100 kPa). Infobox references

1,2-Dibromotetrachloroethane (DBTCE) is an organohalide with the chemical formula C_{2}Br_{2}Cl_{4}. It is a crystalline solid that emits lachrymatory (tear-producing) vapours. Dibromotetrachloroethane can be used as a fungicide, flame retardant and a source for bromine in the laboratory. Because the 1,1-dibromotetrachloroethane isomer is rare, 1,2-dibromotetrachloroethane is frequently referred to as simply dibromotetrachloroethane.

== Reactions and synthesis ==
Dibromotetrachloroethane decomposes to Tetrachloroethylene and bromine when heated. Reacted with potassium sulphide, it gives tetrachloroethylene, potassium bromide and sulphur:

C_{2}Br_{2}Cl_{4} + K_{2}S → C_{2}Cl_{4} + S + 2 KBr

Dibromotetrachloroethane, when reacted with aniline at 140 to 150 °C, gives pure tetrachloroethylene.

When reacted with compounds like cyclohexene, 2,2,4-trimethylpentene, 1-hexene, 1-octene, 2-methyl-1-butene and 2,2,4-trimethyl-2-pentene, it yields allylic monobromides via bromination. Dibromotetrachloroethane loses both of its bromine atoms, leaving tetrachloroethylene and hydrogen bromide.

Dibromotetrachloroethane was discovered by the Italian chemist Faustino Malaguti in 1846. Malaguti exposed a mixture of Tetrachloroethylene (then known as chloréthose) and bromine to sunlight. It was named Bromure de chloréthose ("bromide of chlorethose") after its synthesis method. Similar to Malaguti's method, modern synthesis of dibromotetrachloroethane uses bromine dissolved in carbon tetrachloride on tetrachloroethylene.
