= 2021 Giro d'Italia, Stage 1 to Stage 11 =

Cycling race stages

The 2021 Giro d'Italia is the 104th edition of the Giro d'Italia, one of cycling's Grand Tours. The Giro began in Turin with an individual time trial on 8 May, and Stage 11 occurred on 19 May with a stage to Montalcino. The race finished in Milan on 30 May.

== Classification standings ==
Legend
A pink jersey.	Denotes the leader of the general classification	A blue jersey.	Denotes the leader of the mountains classification
A violet jersey.	Denotes the leader of the points classification	A white jersey.	Denotes the leader of the young rider classification

== Stage 1 ==
8 May 2021 — Turin to Turin, 8.6 km (5.3 mi) (ITT)

For the fourth year in succession, the Giro started with a short individual time trial. This year, the Giro started with an 8.6 kilometres (5.3 mi) test against the clock in Turin. The course was flat all the way through, which meant that the power riders were widely considered as the favourites for the stage victory.

The early benchmark time was set by Team Jumbo–Visma's David Dekker, the second rider to start, who completed the course in a time of 9' 19". His time would be beaten by the next rider, Victor Campenaerts of Team Qhubeka Assos, who took the lead by a few hundredths of a second. Shortly thereafter, Jonathan Castroviejo (INEOS Grenadiers) beat his time by 5 seconds to move into the hot seat, until Matthias Brändle (Israel Start-Up Nation) set a time of 9' 10". Later in the day, Dekker's teammate, Tobias Foss, set the new standard with a time of 9' 00", becoming the first rider to average more than 57 km/h (35 mph). However, his teammate Edoardo Affini broke the 9-minute barrier and blitzed the course in a time of 8' 57". He stayed at the hot seat for a long time before the time trial world champion, Filippo Ganna, rode the course as one of the last riders to go down the start ramp. He dominated the course, averaging more than 57 km/h (35 mph) and finishing in 8' 47", 10 seconds quicker than Affini. It was enough to get him the stage victory and the first maglia rosa for the second year in succession; in doing so, Ganna would also be the first leader of the points and young rider classifications.

In terms of the GC, last year's revelation, João Almeida (Deceuninck–Quick-Step), was the best of the favorites, finishing 4th with a time of 9' 04". His teammate, Remco Evenepoel, who was riding his first race since his crash at last year's Il Lombardia, finished 7th with a time of 9' 06". Another GC contender who set a fast time was Aleksandr Vlasov (Astana–Premier Tech), who finished 11th with a time of 9' 11", while many of the other main GC contenders were clustered around 35 to 40 seconds back of Ganna.

After Krists Neilands (Israel Start-Up Nation) completed his time trial, he crashed while riding back to the team hotel and fractured his collarbone. As a result, the Latvian was forced to withdraw from the race, being the first rider to do so.

Stage 1 Result
Rank	Rider	Team	Time
1	Filippo Ganna (ITA)	INEOS Grenadiers	8' 47"
2	Edoardo Affini (ITA)	Team Jumbo–Visma	+ 10"
3	Tobias Foss (NOR)	Team Jumbo–Visma	+ 13"
4	João Almeida (POR)	Deceuninck–Quick-Step	+ 17"
5	Rémi Cavagna (FRA)	Deceuninck–Quick-Step	+ 18"
6	Jos van Emden (NED)	Team Jumbo–Visma	+ 18"
7	Remco Evenepoel (BEL)	Deceuninck–Quick-Step	+ 19"
8	Max Walscheid (GER)	Team Qhubeka Assos	+ 19"
9	Matthias Brändle (AUT)	Israel Start-Up Nation	+ 22"
10	Gianni Moscon (ITA)	INEOS Grenadiers	+ 23"

General classification after Stage 1
Rank	Rider	Team	Time
1	Filippo Ganna (ITA)	INEOS Grenadiers	8' 47"
2	Edoardo Affini (ITA)	Team Jumbo–Visma	+ 10"
3	Tobias Foss (NOR)	Team Jumbo–Visma	+ 13"
4	João Almeida (POR)	Deceuninck–Quick-Step	+ 17"
5	Rémi Cavagna (FRA)	Deceuninck–Quick-Step	+ 18"
6	Jos van Emden (NED)	Team Jumbo–Visma	+ 18"
7	Remco Evenepoel (BEL)	Deceuninck–Quick-Step	+ 19"
8	Max Walscheid (GER)	Team Qhubeka Assos	+ 19"
9	Matthias Brändle (AUT)	Israel Start-Up Nation	+ 22"
10	Gianni Moscon (ITA)	INEOS Grenadiers	+ 23"

== Stage 2 ==
9 May 2021 — Stupinigi (Nichelino) to Novara, 179 km (111 mi)

The first road stage of the Giro featured a flat stage from Stupinigi to Novara.

This stage was also notable for being held on the 10th anniversary of the death of Belgian rider Wouter Weylandt, who died following a crash on Stage 3 of the 2011 edition. A moment of silence was held in Weylandt's memory prior to the start of the day's race.

A three-man breakaway broke clear as soon as the flag dropped. The break, composed of Vincenzo Albanese (Eolo–Kometa), Umberto Marengo (Bardiani–CSF–Faizanè), and Filippo Tagliani (Androni Giocattoli–Sidermec) were allowed to build up a gap of 4' 20" before the peloton began to bring them back. On the only categorized climb of the day up to Montechiaro d'Asti, it was Albanese who took the points to become the first wearer of the blue mountains jersey before his time on the front ended due to a mechanical. With 40 kilometres (25 mi) to go, Tagliani and Marengo dueled for the first intermediate sprint in Tricerro, which the former won to take maximum points, before Fernando Gaviria took third a few minutes later from the peloton. The remaining duo out front was swept up by the peloton before the second intermediate sprint in Vercelli with 24.5 kilometres (15.2 mi) to go, which featured bonus seconds for the general classification. Race leader Filippo Ganna took the maximum of three bonus seconds to extend his lead, while Remco Evenepoel took two bonus seconds to move ahead of his teammate João Almeida into 4th place in GC.

In the final kilometers, the sprinters and their respective lead-out trains crowded the front of the peloton in preparation for the sprint while the GC teams fought for position at the front to keep their leaders safe. In the final kilometer, there was no clear lead-out train and it was Tim Merlier of Giro debutant team Alpecin–Fenix who started his sprint with 200 meters to go. He would not be overtaken as he took the stage and the points jersey in the process. Giacomo Nizzolo finished second with Elia Viviani taking third. Dylan Groenewegen, who was riding his first race following a nine-month suspension, finished fourth. Ganna finished safely in the peloton to keep the maglia rosa.

Stage 2 Result
Rank	Rider	Team	Time
1	Tim Merlier (BEL)	Alpecin–Fenix	4h 21' 09"
2	Giacomo Nizzolo (ITA)	Team Qhubeka Assos	+ 0"
3	Elia Viviani (ITA)	Cofidis	+ 0"
4	Dylan Groenewegen (NED)	Team Jumbo–Visma	+ 0"
5	Peter Sagan (SVK)	Bora–Hansgrohe	+ 0"
6	Matteo Moschetti (ITA)	Trek–Segafredo	+ 0"
7	Filippo Fiorelli (ITA)	Bardiani–CSF–Faizanè	+ 0"
8	Lawrence Naesen (BEL)	AG2R Citroën Team	+ 0"
9	Davide Cimolai (ITA)	Israel Start-Up Nation	+ 0"
10	Caleb Ewan (AUS)	Lotto–Soudal	+ 0"

General classification after Stage 2
Rank	Rider	Team	Time
1	Filippo Ganna (ITA)	INEOS Grenadiers	4h 29' 53"
2	Edoardo Affini (ITA)	Team Jumbo–Visma	+ 13"
3	Tobias Foss (NOR)	Team Jumbo–Visma	+ 16"
4	Remco Evenepoel (BEL)	Deceuninck–Quick-Step	+ 20"
5	João Almeida (POR)	Deceuninck–Quick-Step	+ 20"
6	Rémi Cavagna (FRA)	Deceuninck–Quick-Step	+ 21"
7	Jos van Emden (NED)	Team Jumbo–Visma	+ 21"
8	Max Walscheid (GER)	Team Qhubeka Assos	+ 22"
9	Matthias Brändle (AUT)	Israel Start-Up Nation	+ 25"
10	Gianni Moscon (ITA)	INEOS Grenadiers	+ 26"

== Stage 3 ==
10 May 2021 — Biella to Canale, 190 km (120 mi)

The third stage featured a hilly course from Biella to Canale. While the first 114 kilometres (71 mi) were mostly flat, the final part of the stage featured one third-category climb and two fourth-category climbs. In addition, there was an uncategorized steep climb up to Guarene, which topped with 15 kilometres (9.3 mi) left and offered bonus seconds instead of mountains classification points, before a mostly flat run-in to the finish.

The stage began with heavy rain, which gradually let up by the midpoint of the stage. Initially, a seven-man group, including mountains classification leader Vincenzo Albanese (Eolo–Kometa) and frequent breakaway participant Simon Pellaud (Androni Giocattoli–Sidermec), went off the front before Pellaud's 18-year-old teammate Andrii Ponomar joined the break following a 10-kilometer chase. The breakaway was allowed a gap of around six minutes before Bora–Hansgrohe began to close the gap for their sprinter, Peter Sagan. At the first intermediate sprint in Canelli, won by Pellaud, before the day's climbs, the gap was reduced to under four minutes. On the first and second climbs, Vincenzo Albanese took first place to extend his lead in the mountains competition, while also managing to snap a single point by placing third on the third climb. Back in the peloton, Bora–Hansgrohe continued their fast pace and began to shed most of the sprinters on the second climb in an attempt to eliminate Sagan's rivals for stage victory. The pace of the peloton meant that the breakaway's lead was reduced to just a minute and a half following the last categorized climb.

As the break took on the final uncategorized climb, Pellaud attacked his breakaway companions, with only Taco van der Hoorn (Intermarché–Wanty–Gobert Matériaux) and Samuele Zoccarato (Bardiani–CSF–Faizanè) able to follow his acceleration. Near the top, Zoccarato was dropped as the duo's lead hovered around 30 seconds. From behind, Giulio Ciccone (Trek–Segafredo) and Tony Gallopin (AG2R Citroën Team) attacked in an attempt to bridge up to the break, but they were unable to close the gap before being reined back in. With 9 kilometres (5.6 mi) to go and the lead hovering around 40 seconds, van der Hoorn dropped Pellaud. He was able to quickly extend his lead to a minute, prompting UAE Team Emirates and Cofidis to contribute to the chase for their respective sprinters. Heading into the final kilometer, van der Hoorn still had a lead of fifteen seconds, which would prove to be enough for him to take the stage victory, which was both his first in a Grand Tour and the first for Intermarché–Wanty–Gobert Matériaux, making their Giro debut. Davide Cimolai (Israel Start-Up Nation) led the peloton home four seconds later just ahead of Sagan in third, while race leader Filippo Ganna finished with the peloton to hold on to the maglia rosa.

Stage 3 Result
Rank	Rider	Team	Time
1	Taco van der Hoorn (NED)	Intermarché–Wanty–Gobert Matériaux	4h 21' 29"
2	Davide Cimolai (ITA)	Israel Start-Up Nation	+ 4"
3	Peter Sagan (SVK)	Bora–Hansgrohe	+ 4"
4	Elia Viviani (ITA)	Cofidis	+ 4"
5	Patrick Bevin (NZL)	Israel Start-Up Nation	+ 4"
6	Gianni Vermeersch (BEL)	Alpecin–Fenix	+ 4"
7	Fernando Gaviria (COL)	UAE Team Emirates	+ 4"
8	Alberto Bettiol (ITA)	EF Education–Nippo	+ 4"
9	Stefano Oldani (ITA)	Lotto–Soudal	+ 4"
10	Jacopo Mosca (ITA)	Trek–Segafredo	+ 4"

General classification after Stage 3
Rank	Rider	Team	Time
1	Filippo Ganna (ITA)	INEOS Grenadiers	8h 51' 26"
2	Tobias Foss (NOR)	Team Jumbo–Visma	+ 16"
3	Remco Evenepoel (BEL)	Deceuninck–Quick-Step	+ 20"
4	João Almeida (POR)	Deceuninck–Quick-Step	+ 20"
5	Rémi Cavagna (FRA)	Deceuninck–Quick-Step	+ 21"
6	Gianni Moscon (ITA)	INEOS Grenadiers	+ 26"
7	Aleksandr Vlasov (RUS)	Astana–Premier Tech	+ 27"
8	Alberto Bettiol (ITA)	EF Education–Nippo	+ 29"
9	Jonathan Castroviejo (ESP)	INEOS Grenadiers	+ 30"
10	Diego Ulissi (ITA)	UAE Team Emirates	+ 32"

== Stage 4 ==
11 May 2021 — Piacenza to Sestola, 187 km (116 mi)

The fourth stage took on a hilly route from Piacenza to Sestola. The first 85 kilometres (53 mi) were mostly flat, followed by a series of hills, before the peloton began to tackle to first of the day's climbs, a third-category hill up to Castello di Carpineti. After that climb, riders descended into the valley before tackling the second third-category climb to Montemolino and then another uncategorized climb. The finale featured an intermediate sprint for bonus seconds in Fanano at the foot of the second-category climb of Colle Passerino, which averaged almost 10 percent across 4.2 kilometres (2.6 mi) and included pitches of up to 16 percent. The climb topped with 2.5 kilometres (1.6 mi) to go before a flat run-in to the line.

Much like the previous day, the peloton encountered heavy rain which persisted for much of the day. The first attacks were made by the Belgian duo of Quinten Hermans (Intermarché–Wanty–Gobert Matériaux) and Victor Campenaerts (Team Qhubeka Assos). Several riders continued to attack from the peloton until 25 riders comprised the day's breakaway. The peloton immediately let the break increase their advantage to around 5 minutes before race leader Filippo Ganna took to the front of the peloton. As the break neared the top of the first third-category climb at Castello di Carpineti, Francesco Gavazzi (Eolo–Kometa) attacked, taking the maximum points to defend teammate Vincenzo Albanese's lead in the mountains classification, while a Christopher Juul-Jensen (Team BikeExchange) and the Intermarché–Wanty–Gobert Matériaux duo of Hermans and Rein Taaramäe pressed on after the climb in pursuit of the stage win. The trio extended their lead to almost two minutes over the rest of the break, putting Taaramäe in a position to possibly take the maglia rosa at the end of the day. Taaramäe attacked near the top of the second climb, with Juul-Jensen following his move. The duo stayed away for much of the day until Alessandro De Marchi (Israel Start-Up Nation) and Joe Dombrowski (UAE Team Emirates) caught up to and passed them on the final climb. Dombrowski launched his move with 4 kilometres (2.5 mi) to go, eventually soloing across the line. De Marchi crossed the line 13 seconds down but finished fast enough to take over the maglia rosa and the race lead.

From behind, the peloton containing the GC contenders remained calm, with Ganna setting the tempo until he was dropped on the second climb. On the final climb of Colle Passerino, Deceuninck–Quick-Step's co-leader João Almeida was dropped; he eventually lost more than four minutes to the other contenders. Near the top, Mikel Landa (Team Bahrain Victorious) and Giulio Ciccone (Trek–Segafredo) attacked before being followed by Egan Bernal (INEOS Grenadiers), Aleksandr Vlasov (Astana–Premier Tech), and Hugh Carthy (EF Education–Nippo) shortly thereafter. The quintet eventually stayed away to finish 11 seconds ahead a seven-man chase group which included Remco Evenepoel (Deceuninck–Quick-Step), Simon Yates (Team BikeExchange), Romain Bardet (Team DSM) and Dan Martin (Israel Start-Up Nation). Meanwhile, a group containing last year's runner up, Jai Hindley (Team DSM), Vincenzo Nibali (Trek–Segafredo), and Emanuel Buchmann (Bora–Hansgrohe) lost 34 seconds while George Bennett (Team Jumbo–Visma) lost almost a minute and a half.

Stage 4 Result
Rank	Rider	Team	Time
1	Joe Dombrowski (USA)	UAE Team Emirates	4h 58' 38"
2	Alessandro De Marchi (ITA)	Israel Start-Up Nation	+ 13"
3	Filippo Fiorelli (ITA)	Bardiani–CSF–Faizanè	+ 27"
4	Louis Vervaeke (BEL)	Alpecin–Fenix	+ 29"
5	Jan Tratnik (SLO)	Team Bahrain Victorious	+ 29"
6	Attila Valter (HUN)	Groupama–FDJ	+ 44"
7	Nicolas Edet (FRA)	Cofidis	+ 49"
8	Nelson Oliveira (POR)	Movistar Team	+ 57"
9	Rein Taaramäe (EST)	Intermarché–Wanty–Gobert Matériaux	+ 1' 33"
10	Christopher Juul-Jensen (DEN)	Team BikeExchange	+ 1' 36"

General classification after Stage 4
Rank	Rider	Team	Time
1	Alessandro De Marchi (ITA)	Israel Start-Up Nation	13h 50' 44"
2	Joe Dombrowski (USA)	UAE Team Emirates	+ 22"
3	Louis Vervaeke (BEL)	Alpecin–Fenix	+ 42"
4	Nelson Oliveira (POR)	Movistar Team	+ 48"
5	Attila Valter (HUN)	Groupama–FDJ	+ 1' 00"
6	Nicolas Edet (FRA)	Cofidis	+ 1' 15"
7	Aleksandr Vlasov (RUS)	Astana–Premier Tech	+ 1' 24"
8	Remco Evenepoel (BEL)	Deceuninck–Quick-Step	+ 1' 28"
9	Alberto Bettiol (ITA)	EF Education–Nippo	+ 1' 37"
10	Hugh Carthy (GBR)	EF Education–Nippo	+ 1' 38"

== Stage 5 ==
12 May 2021 — Modena to Cattolica, 177 km (110 mi)

The fifth stage featured a pan-flat route from Modena to Cattolica. There were two intermediate sprints after 70 kilometres (43 mi) in Imola and after 135.6 kilometres (84.3 mi) in Savignano sul Rubicone. After rain persisted for much of the previous two days, sunny skies greeted the riders for the day.

After the flag dropped, Filippo Tagliani (Androni Giocattoli–Sidermec) and Umberto Marengo (Bardiani–CSF–Faizanè) attacked out of the peloton. The duo was allowed a lead of five minutes before the peloton began to chase. At the first intermediate sprint, Tagliani and Marengo took maximum points but they were reeled in with 106 kilometres (66 mi) to go. The peloton remained calm for the next 38 kilometres (24 mi) before Simon Pellaud (Androni Giocattoli–Sidermec) and Davide Gabburo (Bardiani–CSF–Faizanè) attacked with 68 kilometres (42 mi) to go. The duo was allowed to build a gap of almost a minute and a half before the peloton began to close them down. With 24 kilometres (15 mi) to go, Alexis Gougeard (AG2R Citroën Team) attacked from the peloton and eventually bridged across to the lead duo, but the peloton was already closing in on the break. The trio would eventually be caught with around 3 kilometres (1.9 mi) to go. Bora–Hansgrohe led the peloton into the final kilometre. Stage 2 winner and points classification leader Tim Merlier (Alpecin–Fenix) tried to sprint but he dropped his chain, dropping him out of contention for the win. European and Italian road champion Giacomo Nizzolo (Team Qhubeka Assos) started his sprint first but Caleb Ewan (Lotto–Soudal) came from behind to outsprint Nizzolo for the win. With the second place, Nizzolo accrued enough points to gain the lead in the points classification and take the maglia ciclamino.

Several crashes marred the finale of the day's stage, which featured five sharp 90 degree turns in the final 3 kilometres (1.9 mi). However, most of these crashes occurred before then, meaning that none of the crash victims could benefit from the safety of the three-kilometer rule. Shortly after Gougeard's attack, Tejay van Garderen (EF Education–Nippo), near the back of the peloton, got squeezed against the barriers as the peloton navigated a tight turn and had to stop and remount. With 15.8 kilometres (9.8 mi) to go, Pavel Sivakov (INEOS Grenadiers) went down after getting squeezed and colliding with a tree. Though he appeared to be in serious pain, he eventually resumed riding, but by finishing last on the stage and losing over 13 minutes, his GC hopes were all but over. After the stage, medical scans revealed a possible fractured collarbone, forcing Sivakov to abandon the race. Another crash featured Kobe Goossens (Lotto–Soudal) and Filippo Fiorelli (Bardiani–CSF–Faizanè) with around 8 kilometres (5.0 mi) to go, though both riders were not too seriously injured. The most serious accident took place with 4.3 kilometres (2.7 mi) to go. As the peloton rode past a traffic island, the previous day's winner and mountains classification leader Joe Dombrowski (UAE Team Emirates) collided with the marshal signalling the island, bringing both people down. In the chain reaction, François Bidard (AG2R Citroën Team) and GC favorite Mikel Landa (Team Bahrain Victorious) also crashed heavily. All three riders remained on the ground in noticeable pain for an extended period of time, and while Bidard and Dombrowski were able to get up and ride to the finish, Landa remained on the ground, surrounded by several of his teammates who had stayed behind to help. Eventually, Landa had to abandon the race and was taken in a stretcher off to a local hospital, where he was diagnosed with a broken collarbone and broken ribs.

Stage 5 Result
Rank	Rider	Team	Time
1	Caleb Ewan (AUS)	Lotto–Soudal	4h 07' 01"
2	Giacomo Nizzolo (ITA)	Team Qhubeka Assos	+ 0"
3	Elia Viviani (ITA)	Cofidis	+ 0"
4	Peter Sagan (SVK)	Bora–Hansgrohe	+ 0"
5	Fernando Gaviria (COL)	UAE Team Emirates	+ 0"
6	Matteo Moschetti (ITA)	Trek–Segafredo	+ 0"
7	Andrea Pasqualon (ITA)	Intermarché–Wanty–Gobert Matériaux	+ 0"
8	Dylan Groenewegen (NED)	Team Jumbo–Visma	+ 0"
9	Manuel Belletti (ITA)	Eolo–Kometa	+ 0"
10	Davide Cimolai (ITA)	Israel Start-Up Nation	+ 0"

General classification after Stage 5
Rank	Rider	Team	Time
1	Alessandro De Marchi (ITA)	Israel Start-Up Nation	17h 57' 45"
2	Louis Vervaeke (BEL)	Alpecin–Fenix	+ 42"
3	Nelson Oliveira (POR)	Movistar Team	+ 48"
4	Attila Valter (HUN)	Groupama–FDJ	+ 1' 00"
5	Nicolas Edet (FRA)	Cofidis	+ 1' 15"
6	Aleksandr Vlasov (RUS)	Astana–Premier Tech	+ 1' 24"
7	Remco Evenepoel (BEL)	Deceuninck–Quick-Step	+ 1' 28"
8	Alberto Bettiol (ITA)	EF Education–Nippo	+ 1' 37"
9	Hugh Carthy (GBR)	EF Education–Nippo	+ 1' 38"
10	Egan Bernal (COL)	INEOS Grenadiers	+ 1' 39"

== Stage 6 ==
13 May 2021 — Grotte di Frasassi to Ascoli Piceno (San Giacomo), 160 km (99 mi)

The riders tackled the first summit finish of the race on stage six, with the course finishing in atop the climb of San Giacomo. The first 78.6 kilometres (48.8 mi) gradually went uphill, with an intermediate sprint in Pieve Torina along the way to the base of the first categorized climb, that being the second-category Forca di Gualdo. The third-category climb of the Forca di Presta followed in quick succession before riders faced a long 42 kilometres (26 mi) descent to the foot of San Giacomo, where there was an intermediate sprint offering bonus seconds in Ascoli Piceno. The final climb of San Giacomo was 15.5 kilometres (9.6 mi) long with an average gradient of six percent. The first 10 kilometres (6.2 mi) of the climb averaged between five and six percent but the final 5 kilometres (3.1 mi) averaged 7.5 percent. Following their crashes towards the end of the previous day's stage, François Bidard (AG2R Citroën Team), who broke his collarbone, and Joe Dombrowski (UAE Team Emirates), who was diagnosed with a concussion, abandoned the race before the start of the stage.

Several riders went clear during the first kilometres but Israel Start-Up Nation were able to control the initial breakaway. Eventually, six riders went clear after around 30 kilometres (19 mi), while the duo of Geoffrey Bouchard (AG2R Citroën Team) and Bauke Mollema (Trek–Segafredo) eventually managed to bridge the gap to the break after a long chase. The eight-rider break were allowed to build an advantage of around five and a half minutes. At this point, the rain began to fall down heavily. Towards the top of the Forca di Gualdo, former race leader Filippo Ganna began to drive the pace for INEOS Grenadiers, eventually dropping the maglia rosa Alessandro De Marchi in the process. Around 90 kilometres (56 mi) into the stage, Manuel Belletti (Eolo–Kometa) crashed; the accumulation of this crash, a crash on stage 3, and a crash in the Presidential Tour of Turkey almost a month prior finally took their toll on him and forced his abandonment. On the long descent towards the final climb, a trio of Romain Bardet (Team DSM), Alberto Bettiol (EF Education–Nippo), and Giulio Ciccone (Trek–Segafredo) broke away from the peloton but their escape was short-lived, as the peloton eventually recollected them before they reached Ascoli Piceno at the foot of the San Giacomo climb.

On the final climb, Ganna continued to press on the pace, dropping George Bennett (Team Jumbo–Visma) in the process before cracking himself. The INEOS Grenadiers continued to decrease the break's lead before Daniel Martínez (INEOS Grenadiers) attacked with 3 kilometres (1.9 mi) to go. At around the same time, Gino Mäder (Team Bahrain Victorious) attacked from the break. From behind, INEOS Grenadiers leader Egan Bernal lit up the race with a series of accelerations to whittle down the GC group, with only Ciccone, Remco Evenepoel (Deceuninck–Quick-Step), and Dan Martin (Israel Start-Up Nation) able to follow his move. Despite the GC favorites closing in on Mäder, he managed to hold on and win the stage, taking his first WorldTour and Grand Tour win in the process after coming up just short exactly two months ago on Stage 7 of Paris–Nice. With the points he accumulated on all three of the days' climbs, Mäder also took the lead in the king of the mountains classification. Just twelve seconds later, Bernal, Evenepoel, and Martin would duke it out for the remaining bonus seconds, with Bernal and Martin taking the six and four bonus seconds, respectively, and Ciccone lagging two seconds behind them. Attila Valter (Groupama–FDJ), who started the day in fourth place, finished a further 17 seconds behind the Bernal group to take the maglia rosa and the race lead, with Evenepoel and Bernal less than 20 seconds in arrears. In doing so, Valter became the first Hungarian to wear the maglia rosa in the history of the Giro.

A controversial incident occurred with around 12 kilometres (7.5 mi) to go. As a Team BikeExchange team car tried to pull up alongside an official race car to collect rain jackets left behind from their riders, the Team BikeExchange car ran into the back of Deceuninck–Quick-Step rider Pieter Serry, who had just been dropped from the group ahead. Serry managed to escape without injuries before going on to finish the stage. For their roles in the incident, Team BikeExchange directeur sportif Gene Bates, who was driving the team car, was expelled from the race by the commissaires, while the team's lead directeur sportif Matt White, who was the passenger in the team car, was fined 2,000 CHF. Following the stage, Bates spoke directly to Serry to apologize for the incident.

Stage 6 Result
Rank	Rider	Team	Time
1	Gino Mäder (SUI)	Team Bahrain Victorious	4h 17' 52"
2	Egan Bernal (COL)	INEOS Grenadiers	+ 12"
3	Dan Martin (IRL)	Israel Start-Up Nation	+ 12"
4	Remco Evenepoel (BEL)	Deceuninck–Quick-Step	+ 12"
5	Giulio Ciccone (ITA)	Trek–Segafredo	+ 14"
6	Damiano Caruso (ITA)	Team Bahrain Victorious	+ 25"
7	Daniel Martínez (COL)	INEOS Grenadiers	+ 25"
8	Marc Soler (ESP)	Movistar Team	+ 27"
9	Hugh Carthy (GBR)	EF Education–Nippo	+ 29"
10	Aleksandr Vlasov (RUS)	Astana–Premier Tech	+ 29"

General classification after Stage 6
Rank	Rider	Team	Time
1	Attila Valter (HUN)	Groupama–FDJ	22h 17' 06"
2	Remco Evenepoel (BEL)	Deceuninck–Quick-Step	+ 11"
3	Egan Bernal (COL)	INEOS Grenadiers	+ 16"
4	Aleksandr Vlasov (RUS)	Astana–Premier Tech	+ 24"
5	Louis Vervaeke (BEL)	Alpecin–Fenix	+ 25"
6	Hugh Carthy (GBR)	EF Education–Nippo	+ 38"
7	Damiano Caruso (ITA)	Team Bahrain Victorious	+ 39"
8	Giulio Ciccone (ITA)	Trek–Segafredo	+ 41"
9	Dan Martin (IRL)	Israel Start-Up Nation	+ 47"
10	Simon Yates (GBR)	Team BikeExchange	+ 49"

== Stage 7 ==
14 May 2021 — Notaresco to Termoli, 181 km (112 mi)

The seventh stage of the race featured another chance for the sprinters, with a 181 kilometres (112 mi) course from Notaresco to Termoli. There were several uncategorized hills within the first half of the stage alongside the stage's lone fourth-category climb up to Chieti. Following the first intermediate sprint in Crecchio with 88 kilometres (55 mi) to go, the course continued down the Adriatic coast and was mostly flat until the finish, with a second intermediate sprint for bonus seconds in Fossacesia with 55.4 kilometres (34.4 mi) to go. A 200-meter section, averaging about 12 percent, with 1.5 kilometres (0.93 mi) to go set up the finale of the stage, which was on a slight incline. After losing 20 minutes due to several crashes on the previous stage, Team Qhubeka Assos's GC contender Domenico Pozzovivo withdrew before the stage due to an elbow injury.

As the flag dropped, a trio of breakaway riders immediately jumped from the peloton. Frequent breakaway members Simon Pellaud (Androni Giocattoli–Sidermec) and Umberto Marengo (Bardiani–CSF–Faizanè) were joined by Mark Christian (Eolo–Kometa), and they were allowed to establish a maximum lead of around five minutes before the sprinters' teams began to chase. After the trio took the maximum points at the first intermediate sprint, Daniel Oss (Bora–Hansgrohe) successfully led out his teammate, Peter Sagan, to take five points for the maglia ciclamino competition. Afterwards, the peloton, paced by Thomas De Gendt (Lotto–Soudal), continued to eat into the break's advantage. With 17 kilometres (11 mi) to go, the break was eventually swallowed up. On the 200-metre steep section, Lotto–Soudal led the peloton to keep their sprinter, Caleb Ewan, in a good position. As the peloton reached the final kilometer, Francesco Gavazzi (Eolo–Kometa) attacked from the peloton and was immediately tailed by Oss. The duo built up a small gap before they were caught shortly thereafter, at which point Fernando Gaviria (UAE Team Emirates) made a surprise attack from far out. Ewan calmly closed down the gap to Gaviria before kicking again out of Gaviria's slipstream to win the stage ahead of Davide Cimolai (Israel Start-Up Nation) and Tim Merlier (Alpecin–Fenix). Sagan was well-positioned for the sprint but he clipped the barriers, dropping his chain before eventually finishing 14th on the stage. With his second victory of the race, Ewan gained 50 points, enough to take over the lead in the points classification and to don the maglia ciclamino on the next stage.

Inside the final 3 kilometres (1.9 mi), one of the main GC favourites, Hugh Carthy (EF Education–Nippo), encountered a problem with his saddle, and after he remounted, TV cameras caught him discussing the incident with race commissaires. Carthy initially finished two minutes behind the main peloton, but given that it was a mechanical problem within the last 3 kilometres (1.9 mi), he was given the same time as Ewan and the lead group that he was riding in before the problem. As a result, Carthy kept his sixth place in the GC, 38 seconds behind Attila Valter (Groupama–FDJ), who finished safely in the peloton to keep the maglia rosa ahead of a weekend of mountain stages with uphill finishes.

Stage 7 Result
Rank	Rider	Team	Time
1	Caleb Ewan (AUS)	Lotto–Soudal	4h 42' 12"
2	Davide Cimolai (ITA)	Israel Start-Up Nation	+ 0"
3	Tim Merlier (BEL)	Alpecin–Fenix	+ 0"
4	Matteo Moschetti (ITA)	Trek–Segafredo	+ 0"
5	Andrea Pasqualon (ITA)	Intermarché–Wanty–Gobert Matériaux	+ 0"
6	Fernando Gaviria (COL)	UAE Team Emirates	+ 0"
7	Dylan Groenewegen (NED)	Team Jumbo–Visma	+ 0"
8	Max Kanter (GER)	Team DSM	+ 0"
9	Filippo Fiorelli (ITA)	Bardiani–CSF–Faizanè	+ 0"
10	Juan Sebastián Molano (COL)	UAE Team Emirates	+ 0"

General classification after Stage 7
Rank	Rider	Team	Time
1	Attila Valter (HUN)	Groupama–FDJ	26h 59' 18"
2	Remco Evenepoel (BEL)	Deceuninck–Quick-Step	+ 11"
3	Egan Bernal (COL)	INEOS Grenadiers	+ 16"
4	Aleksandr Vlasov (RUS)	Astana–Premier Tech	+ 24"
5	Louis Vervaeke (BEL)	Alpecin–Fenix	+ 25"
6	Hugh Carthy (GBR)	EF Education–Nippo	+ 38"
7	Damiano Caruso (ITA)	Team Bahrain Victorious	+ 39"
8	Giulio Ciccone (ITA)	Trek–Segafredo	+ 41"
9	Dan Martin (IRL)	Israel Start-Up Nation	+ 47"
10	Simon Yates (GBR)	Team BikeExchange	+ 49"

== Stage 8 ==
15 May 2021 — Foggia to Guardia Sanframondi, 170 km (110 mi)

Stage 8 was the southernmost of this year's Giro, and it took the riders from Foggia to a first-time stage finish in Guardia Sanframondi for the second summit finish of the race. There was an uncategorized climb after 29.8 kilometres (18.5 mi) and an intermediate sprint in Campobasso after 84 kilometres (52 mi). Afterwards, the riders tackled the second-category climb of Bocca della Selva, which was 19.6 kilometres (12.2 mi) long with an average gradient of 4.5 percent. Following a long descent, the riders passed through the second intermediate sprint, with bonus seconds on offer, in Castelvenere before tackling the final climb to Guardia Sanframondi, which was 3.1 kilometres (1.9 mi) long at an average of 6.5 percent, with the first 2.5 kilometres (1.6 mi) averageing at 7.6 percent before easing off towards the top.

Crosswinds delivered some action at the start of the stage. At one point, INEOS Grenadiers's leader Egan Bernal found himself in a front group with a slight gap on the other favourites, but the move was eventually closed down. As the peloton eased up, a group of eight attacked from the peloton after 60 kilometres (37 mi) to finally form the day's breakaway; among the riders was Fernando Gaviria (UAE Team Emirates), who was looking for points in the points competition. Current hour record holder Victor Campenaerts (Team Qhubeka Assos) eventually bridged up to the break after a long chase to make it nine out front. As there was no threat to the maglia rosa of Attila Valter (Groupama–FDJ), the peloton was content to let the break go, allowing them to build a maximum advantage of around seven and a half minutes. At the first intermediate sprint, Gaviria took maximum points. On the climb of Bocca della Selva, Gaviria attacked, looking to get a head start before the descent. However, he crashed while negotiating a turn on the descent, suffering cuts and bruises in the process, although he was eventually able to bridge back up to the break. On the final climb to Guardia Sanframondi, the break attempted several attacks before an attack from Campenaerts and Giovanni Carboni (Bardiani–CSF–Faizanè) managed to stick, and they were able to quickly build a gap of around 10 seconds. Alexis Gougeard (AG2R Citroën Team) attempted to bridge to them but he would be brought back by the other remnants of the break. On the climb proper, Campenaerts was dropped by Carboni, while behind, Victor Lafay (Cofidis) attacked from the chasing group. He quickly passed Campenaerts and Carboni before soloing to the stage win, his first as a professional. This was also his team's first stage win at the Giro since Stage 17 of the 2010 edition, on which Damien Monier won in a similar fashion from a breakaway atop a summit finish. Second place on the stage went to Francesco Gavazzi (Eolo–Kometa), who made a late attack to try and bridge up to Lafay and finished 36 seconds back, while Carboni and Campenaerts faded to fifth and seventh, respectively.

From behind, Groupama–FDJ was able to take complete control of the peloton. Despite the uphill finish, no contenders attempted to make a move in anticipation of the much tougher stage the next day. Most of favourites finished together almost five minutes behind Lafay, led in by João Almeida (Deceuninck–Quick-Step). However, in the final kilometre, a crash involving Pello Bilbao (Team Bahrain Victorious) and Matteo Fabbro (Bora–Hansgrohe) caused a minor split in the group. Because the three-kilometer rule is usually applied flat stages only, this incident was not covered by such an insurance policy. As a result, riders such as Jai Hindley (Team DSM) and Louis Vervaeke (Alpecin–Fenix), who was 5th on GC, that were caught behind the crash lost 11 and 25 seconds, respectively, to the other favourites. Bilbao finished a further five seconds behind Vervaeke to limit his losses, while Fabbro lost an additional three minutes.

Caleb Ewan (Lotto–Soudal), who wore the maglia ciclamino as the leader of the points classification, abandoned early on during the stage due to knee pain and in order to prepare for the Tour de France, citing that continuing further would hamper his goal of winning a stage in each of the three Grand Tours in a calendar year. Because of this, Tim Merlier (Alpecin–Fenix), who was second in the classification behind Ewan, inherited the maglia ciclamino after the stage.

Stage 8 Result
Rank	Rider	Team	Time
1	Victor Lafay (FRA)	Cofidis	4h 06' 47"
2	Francesco Gavazzi (ITA)	Eolo–Kometa	+ 36"
3	Nikias Arndt (GER)	Team DSM	+ 37"
4	Nelson Oliveira (POR)	Movistar Team	+ 41"
5	Giovanni Carboni (ITA)	Bardiani–CSF–Faizanè	+ 41"
6	Kobe Goossens (BEL)	Lotto–Soudal	+ 58"
7	Victor Campenaerts (BEL)	Team Qhubeka Assos	+ 1' 00"
8	Alexis Gougeard (FRA)	AG2R Citroën Team	+ 1' 54"
9	Fernando Gaviria (COL)	UAE Team Emirates	+ 3' 04"
10	João Almeida (POR)	Deceuninck–Quick-Step	+ 4' 48"

General classification after Stage 8
Rank	Rider	Team	Time
1	Attila Valter (HUN)	Groupama–FDJ	31h 10' 53"
2	Remco Evenepoel (BEL)	Deceuninck–Quick-Step	+ 11"
3	Egan Bernal (COL)	INEOS Grenadiers	+ 16"
4	Aleksandr Vlasov (RUS)	Astana–Premier Tech	+ 24"
5	Hugh Carthy (GBR)	EF Education–Nippo	+ 38"
6	Damiano Caruso (ITA)	Team Bahrain Victorious	+ 39"
7	Giulio Ciccone (ITA)	Trek–Segafredo	+ 41"
8	Dan Martin (IRL)	Israel Start-Up Nation	+ 47"
9	Simon Yates (GBR)	Team BikeExchange	+ 49"
10	Louis Vervaeke (BEL)	Alpecin–Fenix	+ 50"

== Stage 9 ==
16 May 2021 — Castel di Sangro to Campo Felice (Rocca di Cambio), 158 km (98 mi)

On Stage 9, the Giro began turning back north as the riders faced the first proper mountain stage of this year's race. The up-and-down route featured very little flat sections and covered just over 3,500 metres (11,500 ft) of elevation with four categorized climbs on the menu along with three other uncategorized climbs. Almost right from the start, riders took on the uncategorized Colle della Croce before the second-category Passo Godi, a 13.9-kilometre (8.6 mi) climb averaging 4.1 percent. Following this, riders continued north over the uncategorized 11.4-kilometre (7.1 mi) long Fonte Ciarlotto and the third-category 12.7-kilometre (7.9 mi) long Forca Caruso, both of which had an average gradient of 4.5 percent. In Celano, riders turned almost immediately from the descent of the latter onto the second-category climb up to Ovindoli, which had an intermediate sprint on the lower slopes of the five percent, 12.4-kilometre (7.7 mi) long climb. The last uncategorized climb to Rocca di Cambio summited at 8.5 km (5.3 mi) to go with an intermediate sprint for bonus seconds. The final climb of Campo Felice had an average gradient of 5.8 percent over 5.7 kilometres (3.5 mi), with the final 1.6 kilometres (0.99 mi) of the climb averaging 8.8 percent on gravel roads.

Before the stage, Tomasz Marczyński (Lotto–Soudal) abandoned due to lingering long COVID symptoms. On the first uncategorized climb, multiple riders, including stage 6 winner Gino Mäder (Team Bahrain Victorious) and stage 8 winner Victor Lafay (Cofidis) looked to ignite a breakaway, but to no avail. On the Passo Godi, a group was able to get a gap of around 30 seconds but UAE Team Emirates, having missed the break, rode hard to chase the group. Over the top of the climb, Mäder took maximum points to extend his lead in the mountains classification, while behind, Daniel Martínez (INEOS Grenadiers) and Damiano Caruso (Team Bahrain Victorious) attacked from the peloton and eventually bridged across to the front group. On the descent of Passo Godi, a horrific crash in the break happened when Caruso's teammate Matej Mohorič hit a crack in the road and lost his balance, somersaulting over his handlebars and landing on his head; the impact of the crash was great enough that Mohorič's front wheel and fork snapped off the rest of his bike. Though he never lost consciousness and was able to stand up, he abandoned the race upon the advice of race and team doctors; Mohorič would later confirm via Twitter that he escaped with only a minor concussion and no broken bones. The remnants of the initial breakaway were caught just before the next climb. With 70 kilometres (43 mi) into the stage, a 17-man group soon broke away on the Fonte Ciarlotto, constituting the final breakaway of the day. The group led by as much as three and a half minutes before INEOS Grenadiers took over from Groupama–FDJ at the front of the peloton to set the pace on the penultimate climb of the day up to Ovindoli. As light rain began to fall, Simon Carr (EF Education–Nippo) attacked from the break and was joined shortly after by Geoffrey Bouchard (AG2R Citroën Team). The latter took maximum points at the summit, which was to propel him into the virtual lead of the mountains classification.

On the final climb of the day, with 9.3 kilometres (5.8 mi) left, Bouchard dropped Carr, who drifted back to a chasing trio composed of Koen Bouwman (Team Jumbo–Visma), Bauke Mollema (Trek–Segafredo), and Michael Storer (Team DSM). The INEOS Grenadiers-led peloton continued to eat into the gap, which fell below a minute with 3 kilometres (1.9 mi) to go. Bouwman attacked his companions in the chasing group and caught Bouchard on the final gravel section just outside of the final kilometer, but their lead had been further reduced to just 22 seconds by Gianni Moscon, who continued to set a fast pace on the front of the GC group for his team leader Egan Bernal (INEOS Grenadiers). At the back end of the group, however, race leader Attila Valter (Groupama–FDJ) was finally unable to keep up and was dropped. With around 500 metres (1,600 ft) to go, Aleksandr Vlasov (Astana–Premier Tech) put in an acceleration that prompted Bernal and the other GC favourites to chase him down. Bernal then immediately went around Vlasov and countered with an acceleration of his own, with only Giulio Ciccone (Trek–Segafredo) being able to follow. However, as Bernal and Ciccone passed both Bouchard and Bouwman with 400 metres (1,300 ft) to go, Bernal put in a second dig to distance Ciccone before soloing to the stage win, seven seconds ahead of Ciccone and Vlasov. Remco Evenepoel (Deceuninck–Quick-Step), who wore the white jersey on behalf of Valter, was caught out of position when Bernal attacked but managed to come back and finish fourth, 10 seconds behind Bernal, while Valter finished 49 seconds down. As a result, Bernal took both the maglia rosa and the maglia bianca, with Evenepoel in second at 15 seconds in arrears and Vlasov in third at 21 seconds behind. The 40 mountains classification points gained by Bernal at the finish vaulted him up the standings with 48 points total, but it was not enough to overtake the 51 points of Bouchard, who donned the maglia azzurra as the mountains classification leader.

During the stage, the race saw two more abandonments. Lotto–Soudal was further reduced to five riders with the abandonment of Jasper De Buyst, while AG2R Citroën Team lost their second rider, Clément Champoussin, who fell ill and could not continue.

Stage 9 Result
Rank	Rider	Team	Time
1	Egan Bernal (COL)	INEOS Grenadiers	4h 08' 23"
2	Giulio Ciccone (ITA)	Trek–Segafredo	+ 7"
3	Aleksandr Vlasov (RUS)	Astana–Premier Tech	+ 7"
4	Remco Evenepoel (BEL)	Deceuninck–Quick-Step	+ 10"
5	Dan Martin (IRL)	Israel Start-Up Nation	+ 10"
6	Damiano Caruso (ITA)	Team Bahrain Victorious	+ 12"
7	Romain Bardet (FRA)	Team DSM	+ 12"
8	Marc Soler (ESP)	Movistar Team	+ 12"
9	Daniel Martínez (COL)	INEOS Grenadiers	+ 12"
10	João Almeida (POR)	Deceuninck–Quick-Step	+ 12"

General classification after Stage 9
Rank	Rider	Team	Time
1	Egan Bernal (COL)	INEOS Grenadiers	35h 19' 22"
2	Remco Evenepoel (BEL)	Deceuninck–Quick-Step	+ 15"
3	Aleksandr Vlasov (RUS)	Astana–Premier Tech	+ 21"
4	Giulio Ciccone (ITA)	Trek–Segafredo	+ 36"
5	Attila Valter (HUN)	Groupama–FDJ	+ 43"
6	Hugh Carthy (GBR)	EF Education–Nippo	+ 44"
7	Damiano Caruso (ITA)	Team Bahrain Victorious	+ 45"
8	Dan Martin (IRL)	Israel Start-Up Nation	+ 51"
9	Simon Yates (GBR)	Team BikeExchange	+ 55"
10	Davide Formolo (ITA)	UAE Team Emirates	+ 1' 01"

== Stage 10 ==
17 May 2021 — L'Aquila to Foligno, 139 km (86 mi)

The last stage before the first rest day saw the race continue northward from L'Aquila to Foligno, for what was expected to be another opportunity for the sprinters. Once riders rode out of the start town, they would tackle the uncategorized Sella di Corno, which averaged 4.2 percent in gradient over 6 kilometres (3.7 mi), before descending down into the valley below, with the first intermediate sprint in Santa Rufina at 47.5 kilometres (29.5 mi) into the stage. A pair of short uncategorized climbs, the Forca di Arrone and the climb up to Cantoniera, preceded the fourth-category Valico della Somma, the only categorized climb of the day, which averaged five percent in gradient over 6.8 kilometres (4.2 mi). From its summit with 38 kilometres (24 mi) to go, it was downhill to the second intermediate sprint with bonus seconds on offer at Campello sul Clitunno with 17 kilometres (11 mi) left, before a flat run-in to the finish.

Right from the start, the day's breakaway was formed. Simon Pellaud (Androni Giocattoli–Sidermec) and Umberto Marengo (Bardiani–CSF–Faizanè) were once again part of the break, as was Samuele Rivi (Eolo–Kometa) and stage 3 winner Taco van der Hoorn (Intermarché–Wanty–Gobert Matériaux). Lotto–Soudal missed the initial break attempt, but Kobe Goossens attacked across shortly after to make it a quintet out front. While Goossens and van der Hoorn were content to roll over the intermediate sprint, Marengo, Pellaud, and Rivi had a cagey contest for the points on offer, and Rivi got the better of Marengo while Pellaud settled for third. The break eventually joined back together, but shortly thereafter, they were forced to stop at a closed level crossing to let a train pass. However, because it was a rather quick stoppage, race commissaires deemed it a 'race incident' and the peloton behind were not forced to stop as well in order to maintain the breakaway's advantage, which had already been quite slim but was slashed in half from just under three minutes to around one and a half minutes. On the slopes of the third and last uncategorized climb, Marengo was dropped from the break after an acceleration from Pellaud. Meanwhile, in the peloton behind, Bora–Hansgrohe took to the front and ramped up the pace, adopting a similar strategy to what they did on stage 3 in order to drop as many of Peter Sagan's sprint rivals as possible. The main damage was done on the Valico della Somma: as Marengo dropped back to the peloton, several sprinters, including Dylan Groenewegen (Team Jumbo–Visma), maglia ciclamino Tim Merlier (Alpecin–Fenix), and Giacomo Nizzolo (Team Qhubeka Assos), were among those that could not cope with Bora–Hansgrohe's furious pace and were dropped. Giovanni Aleotti, in his debut Giro and Grand Tour, led the Bora–Hansgrohe train and the peloton over the summit of the Valico della Somma to take the maximum mountains classification points on offer unchallenged, with teammates Daniel Oss and Emanuel Buchmann sweeping up the rest of the points. Victor Campenaerts (Team Qhubeka Assos) had dropped back to try and pace his teammate Nizzolo back up to the peloton, but the duo never managed to chip into their deficit and they eventually resigned themselves to being out of contention for the final sprint. Israel Start-Up Nation came to front to help Bora–Hansgrohe, while Deceuninck–Quick-Step lined up ahead of the second intermediate sprint for team leader Remco Evenepoel to try and take some bonus seconds. Seeing this, INEOS Grenadiers also presented themselves at the front of the peloton, with former race leader Filippo Ganna leading out current race leader Egan Bernal to maintain the latter's 15-second gap over second-placed Evenepoel. Neither GC contender seemed to give the sprint too much effort, but when Bernal's teammate Jhonatan Narváez saw that Bernal would not be able to come around Evenepoel, he let off his own sprint to take the maximum of three bonus seconds, with Evenepoel getting two seconds to Bernal's one to reduce the deficit to 14 seconds.

Into the final kilometers, Team DSM took over at the front for their sprinter Max Kanter, but his crash in a turn with 700 metres (2,300 ft) to go derailed their plans for a stage win. The crash created a split in the group, leaving only a handful of sprinters left to contest the stage. Juan Sebastián Molano (UAE Team Emirates) tried to lead it out for his sprinter Fernando Gaviria, but the latter lost the wheel. Sagan, however, took advantage of the mistake, closing down Molano before starting his sprint from a long way out. Despite that, he was able to hold off Gaviria and Davide Cimolai (Israel Start-Up Nation) to take his second Giro stage win in as many participations; coincidentally, his first Giro stage win happened to be Stage 10 of last year's Giro. The win garnered Sagan 50 points, which was enough for him to take over the lead in the points classification from Merlier and don the maglia ciclamino. The splits caused by Kanter's crash also saw Aleksandr Vlasov (Astana–Premier Tech) and Marc Soler (Movistar Team) among those to finish seven seconds behind Sagan and 21 seconds ahead of Bernal, but the three-kilometer rule gave everyone caught behind the crash the same finishing time as Sagan, thereby maintaining the GC standings from the day before.

Stage 10 Result
Rank	Rider	Team	Time
1	Peter Sagan (SVK)	Bora–Hansgrohe	3h 10' 56"
2	Fernando Gaviria (COL)	UAE Team Emirates	+ 0"
3	Davide Cimolai (ITA)	Israel Start-Up Nation	+ 0"
4	Stefano Oldani (ITA)	Lotto–Soudal	+ 0"
5	Gianni Vermeersch (BEL)	Alpecin–Fenix	+ 0"
6	Dries De Bondt (BEL)	Alpecin–Fenix	+ 0"
7	Andrea Vendrame (ITA)	AG2R Citroën Team	+ 0"
8	Vincenzo Albanese (ITA)	Eolo–Kometa	+ 0"
9	Elia Viviani (ITA)	Cofidis	+ 0"
10	Juan Sebastián Molano (COL)	UAE Team Emirates	+ 0"

General classification after Stage 10
Rank	Rider	Team	Time
1	Egan Bernal (COL)	INEOS Grenadiers	38h 30' 17"
2	Remco Evenepoel (BEL)	Deceuninck–Quick-Step	+ 14"
3	Aleksandr Vlasov (RUS)	Astana–Premier Tech	+ 22"
4	Giulio Ciccone (ITA)	Trek–Segafredo	+ 37"
5	Attila Valter (HUN)	Groupama–FDJ	+ 44"
6	Hugh Carthy (GBR)	EF Education–Nippo	+ 45"
7	Damiano Caruso (ITA)	Team Bahrain Victorious	+ 46"
8	Dan Martin (IRL)	Israel Start-Up Nation	+ 52"
9	Simon Yates (GBR)	Team BikeExchange	+ 56"
10	Davide Formolo (ITA)	UAE Team Emirates	+ 1' 02"

== Rest day 1 ==
18 May 2021 — Foligno

== Stage 11 ==
19 May 2021 — Perugia to Montalcino, 162 km (101 mi)

The stage after the first rest day featured four sectors of gravel roads, amounting to a total of 35.2 kilometres (21.9 mi) and all compacted in the final 69.2 kilometres (43.0 mi) of the stage. The first 92.8 kilometres (57.7 mi) of the stage featured a few uncategorized hills before the riders reached the first sector of gravel roads, which was 9.1 kilometres (5.7 mi) long and mostly descending. The second sector was the first climb of the Passo del Lume Spento, the only categorized climb of the stage, which also featured the first intermediate sprint at Castiglione del Bosco early on into the sector. This was the longest sector of the four, at 13.5 kilometres (8.4 mi) long. Following the descent, the riders crossed through the second, bonus seconds-offering intermediate sprint in Castelnuovo dell'Abate before immediately tackling the third sector, which was 7.6 kilometres (4.7 mi) long on an uncategorized climb. Following the descent, the riders tackled the last sector on the Passo del Lume Spento, this time being climbed from a different side. The last sector was 5 kilometres (3.1 mi) long before the riders continued on normal roads the rest of the way up the climb. The stage finished with a 200-metre (660 ft) long steep ramp after a descent of 3.8 kilometres (2.4 mi) into Montalcino.

The day's breakaway formed as soon as the flag dropped, with 11 riders going off the front. The break was allowed to reach a maximum of 14 minutes, making it more likely that someone from the break was going to take the stage. The break was fully intact on the first sector, but as they approached the second sector, Roger Kluge (Lotto–Soudal) and Bert-Jan Lindeman (Team Qhubeka Assos) were immediately dropped. Shortly thereafter, Taco van der Hoorn (Intermarché–Wanty–Gobert Matériaux) followed suit just before the first intermediate sprint. On the descent leading up to the third sector, all three would eventually make it catch back on, although Lindeman was dropped from the break for good through this sector. On the last sector, with the rest of the break still intact, Dries De Bondt (Alpecin–Fenix) kicked off the hostilities, with Mauro Schmid (Team Qhubeka Assos) and Alessandro Covi (UAE Team Emirates) joining him shortly afterwards. As the trio went back to the tarmac and onto the final climb of the Passo del Lume Spento, De Bondt was dropped from the front while Covi and Schmid worked together to build their gap over their breakaway companions. The duo would contest the sprint for the stage win, with Schmid outsprinting Covi to take his first professional win.

Meanwhile, in the maglia rosa group, Filippo Ganna (INEOS Grenadiers) increased the pace on the first sector, causing splits in the group. Remco Evenepoel (Deceuninck–Quick-Step), Aleksandr Vlasov (Astana–Premier Tech), Simon Yates (Team BikeExchange), Hugh Carthy (EF Education–Nippo), and Emanuel Buchmann (Bora–Hansgrohe) soon found themselves around 30 seconds behind the Ineos-led front group but they would eventually latch on back just ahead of the second sector. Amidst the chaos in the favourites' group, two riders who started the day in the top ten of the GC, Dan Martin (Israel Start-Up Nation) and Davide Formolo (UAE Team Emirates) were definitively distanced on the first sector, with both riders dropping out of contention by the day's end. On the second sector, the group would remain relatively intact before the Team Jumbo–Visma duo of George Bennett and Tobias Foss attacked near the top of the steep section of the climb. The duo had a gap of around 30 seconds before the (INEOS Grenadiers) brought them back as they approached the third sector.

On the third sector, the (INEOS Grenadiers) continued to lead the maglia rosa group, but at the back of the group, Evenepoel was beginning to lose contact. Sensing the opportunity to distance his closest rival at this point, Egan Bernal pressed on the pace. It took a while for João Almeida to drop back and assist his teammate, but by this time, Evenepoel was almost a minute down on the Bernal group. Evenepoel was visibly uncomfortable on the gravel and he would eventually lose two minutes on the day. As the main group of favourites reached the tarmac at the end of the last sector, Giulio Ciccone (Trek–Segafredo) made the first acceleration, but he was immediately caught and dropped. Buchmann was the next to attack from the maglia rosa group, putting on a sustained acceleration to maintain his gap. As the maglia rosa group began to splinter, Carthy briefly accelerated before Vlasov made a bigger acceleration. However, Bernal immediately stuck to the latter's wheel before producing a counter-attack to drop the rest of the group. Bernal worked together with Buchmann to increase their advantage before the former dropped the latter on the final 200-metre ramp to the line. All of the other favourites crossed the line in drips and drabs from behind.

In terms of the battle for the maglia rosa, Bernal increased his advantage to 45 seconds over Vlasov, who rose to second overall, with no other rider within a minute of Bernal's lead. Damiano Caruso (Team Bahrain Victorious) rose to third overall at 1' 12" behind Bernal. As a result of his efforts, Buchmann rose to sixth overall, while Foss and Daniel Martinez (INEOS Grenadiers) climbed into the top ten. As for those who lost time on the stage, Evenepoel dropped to seventh overall at almost two and a half minutes behind Bernal, while Ciccone dropped to eighth, having lost almost two minutes on the day. However, the biggest of these losers were Martin and Formolo, who both finished more than six minutes behind Bernal.

Stage 11 Result
Rank	Rider	Team	Time
1	Mauro Schmid (SUI)	Team Qhubeka Assos	4h 01' 55"
2	Alessandro Covi (ITA)	UAE Team Emirates	+ 1"
3	Harm Vanhoucke (BEL)	Lotto–Soudal	+ 26"
4	Dries De Bondt (BEL)	Alpecin–Fenix	+ 41"
5	Simon Guglielmi (FRA)	Groupama–FDJ	+ 41"
6	Enrico Battaglin (ITA)	Bardiani–CSF–Faizanè	+ 44"
7	Roger Kluge (GER)	Lotto–Soudal	+ 1' 23"
8	Francesco Gavazzi (ITA)	Eolo–Kometa	+ 1' 37"
9	Taco van der Hoorn (NED)	Intermarché–Wanty–Gobert Matériaux	+ 1' 43"
10	Lawrence Naesen (BEL)	AG2R Citroën Team	+ 1' 59"

General classification after Stage 11
Rank	Rider	Team	Time
1	Egan Bernal (COL)	INEOS Grenadiers	42h 35' 21"
2	Aleksandr Vlasov (RUS)	Astana–Premier Tech	+ 45"
3	Damiano Caruso (ITA)	Team Bahrain Victorious	+ 1' 12"
4	Hugh Carthy (GBR)	EF Education–Nippo	+ 1' 17"
5	Simon Yates (GBR)	Team BikeExchange	+ 1' 22"
6	Emanuel Buchmann (GER)	Bora–Hansgrohe	+ 1' 50"
7	Remco Evenepoel (BEL)	Deceuninck–Quick-Step	+ 2' 22"
8	Giulio Ciccone (ITA)	Trek–Segafredo	+ 2' 24"
9	Tobias Foss (NOR)	Team Jumbo–Visma	+ 2' 49"
10	Daniel Martínez (COL)	INEOS Grenadiers	+ 3' 15"
