= Bédard =

Origin
- Origin: French
- Region of origin: France

Other names
- Variant forms: Bedard, Bedore, Badour

Bédard or Bedard is a Franco-Canadian surname, with origins from France.

It may refer to:

- Connor Bedard (born 2005), Canadian ice hockey player
- David Bédard (born 1965), Canadian Olympic diver
- Denis Bédard (born 1950), Canadian composer and organist
- Énola Bédard (born 2000), Canadian dancer
- Éric Bédard (born 1976), Canadian Olympic speed skater
- Érik Bédard (born 1979), Canadian pitcher in Major League Baseball
- Georges Bédard (born c. 1946), Canadian politician
- Irene Bedard (born 1967), American actress
- Jim Bedard (ice hockey, born 1927), (1927–1994), Canadian ice hockey player
- Jim Bedard (ice hockey, born 1956), (born 1956), Canadian ice hockey player
- Louise Bédard (born 1955), is a Canadian contemporary dance choreographer
- Marc-André Bédard (politician) (1935–2020), Canadian politician
- Marc-André Bédard (biathlete) (born 1986), Canadian biathlete
- Michael Bedard, Canadian novelist, b. 1949
- Myriam Bédard (born 1969), Canadian Olympic biathlete
- Patrick Bedard (born 1941), American racing journalist
- Pierre-Stanislas Bédard (1762–1829), Canadian lawyer, judge, journalist and political figure
- Robert Joseph Bedard (1929–2011), Canadian Roman Catholic priest
- Robert Bédard (wrestler) (1932–2019), Canadian professional wrestler
- Robert Bédard (tennis) (born 1931), Canadian tennis player
- Stéphane Bédard (born 1968), Canadian politician
- Tony Bedard, comic book writer
