= Théophile Bidard =

French politician (1804–1877)

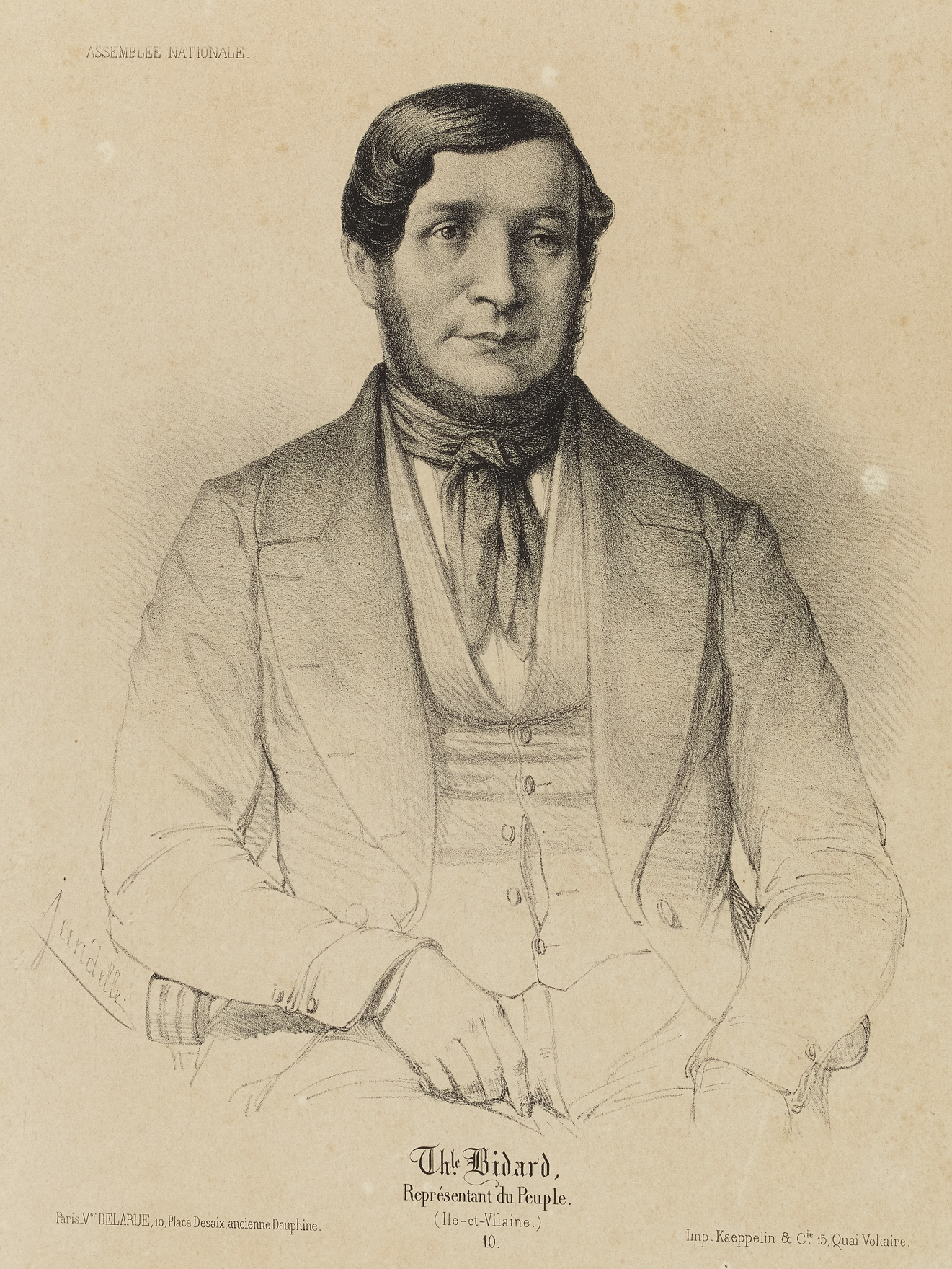

Mayor of Rennes
- In office 1870–1871
- Preceded by: Armand Gaultier de la Guistière
- Succeeded by: Edgar Le Bastard

Personal details
- Born: 11 March 1804 Rennes, France
- Died: 23 October 1877 (aged 73) Rennes, France
- Party: Moderate Republicans

Théophile Bidard de la Noë (11 March 1804 – 23 October 1877) was a French politician and law professor, although he might be most remembered as the employer and principal witness for the prosecution against serial killer Hélène Jégado in 1851.

Bidard was born in Rennes in 1804. He sat in the Constituent Assembly from 1848 to 1849 as a moderate republican and in the National Assembly from 1871 to 1876 as a member of the Orléanist parliamentary group, Centre droit.

He served as Mayor of Rennes from October 1870 to January 1871.
