= Dominique Bidard =

French weightlifter

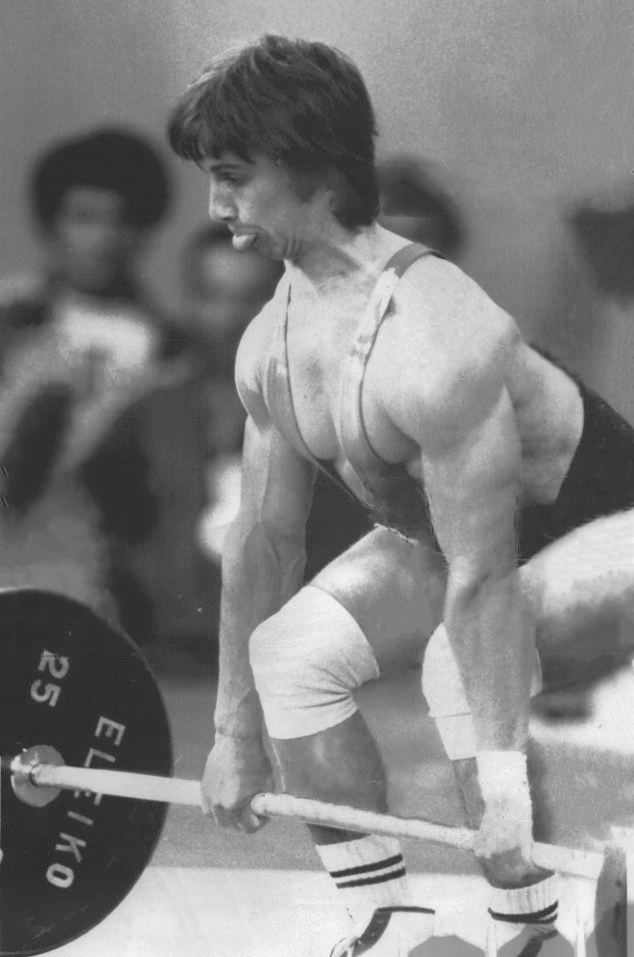
- Bidard at the 1976 Olympics

Personal information
- Born: 4 February 1955 (age 71)
- Height: 162 cm (5 ft 4 in)
- Weight: 62 kg (137 lb)

Sport
- Sport: Weightlifting

Dominique Bidard (born 4 February 1955) is a retired French featherweight weightlifter. He placed 11th at the 1976 Summer Olympics, and 12th–15th at the world championships in 1975 and 1977–1979.
