= François Bidard =

French cyclist

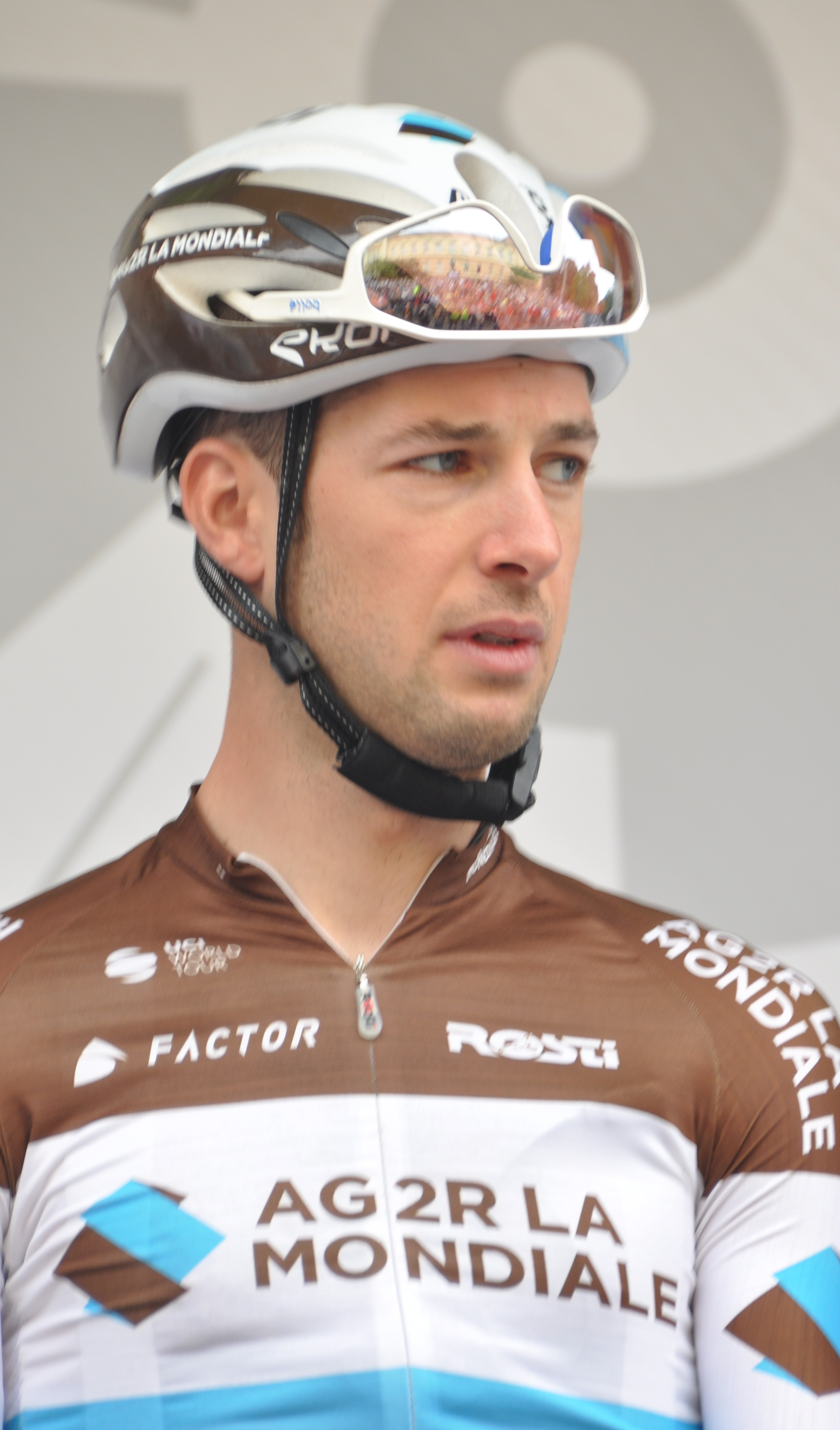
- Bidard at the 2018 Deutschland Tour

Personal information
- Full name: François Bidard
- Nickname: Bidoche
- Born: 19 March 1992 (age 34) Lonlay-l'Abbaye, France
- Height: 1.80 m (5 ft 11 in)
- Weight: 65 kg (143 lb)

Cycling career
- Sport: Cycling
- Current team: Retired
- Discipline: Road
- Role: Rider
- Rider type: Puncheur; Climber

Amateur teams
- 2010–2012: ACV Aurillacois
- 2013: CR4C Roanne
- 2014–2015: Chambéry CF

Professional teams
- 2014: Ag2r–La Mondiale (stagiaire)
- 2015: AG2R La Mondiale (stagiaire)
- 2016–2021: AG2R La Mondiale
- 2022–2023: Cofidis

François Bidard (born 19 March 1992) is a French former racing cyclist, who competed as a professional from 2016 to 2023. He was named in the startlist for the 2016 Vuelta a España and the start list for the 2017 Giro d'Italia.

== Major results ==
2013
8th Overall Tour du Gévaudan Languedoc-Roussillon
2014
5th Piccolo Giro di Lombardia
2015
4th Overall Rhône-Alpes Isère Tour
2018
5th Overall Circuit de la Sarthe
2019
9th Trofeo Laigueglia

=== Grand Tour general classification results timeline ===
Grand Tour	2016	2017	2018	2019	2020	2021	2022	2023
Giro d'Italia	—	39	37	30	39	DNF	—	54
Tour de France	Has not contested during his career							
Vuelta a España	94	—	—	24	—	—	—	125

Legend
—	Did not compete
DNF	Did not finish
