= 2024 Decathlon–AG2R La Mondiale season =

Decathlon–AG2R La Mondiale
- 2024 season
- UCI code: DAT
- Status: UCI WorldTeam
- Manager: Dominique Serieys (FRA)
- Main sponsor(s): Decathlon; AG2R La Mondiale
- Based: France
- Bicycles: Van Rysel
- Groupset: Shimano

Season victories
- One-day races: 8
- Stage race overall: 3
- Stage race stages: 16
- National Championships: 3
- Most wins: (France) Benoît Cosnefroy (7)

The 2024 season for the Decathlon–AG2R La Mondiale team is the team's 33rd season in existence and the 19th consecutive season as a UCI WorldTeam.

== Team roster ==
As of 16 January 2024.

Rider	Date of birth
Bruno Armirail (FRA)	11 April 1994 (aged 29)
Alex Baudin (FRA)	25 May 2001 (aged 22)
Clément Berthet (FRA)	2 August 1997 (aged 26)
Edvald Boasson Hagen (NOR)	17 May 1987 (aged 36)
Franck Bonnamour (FRA)	20 June 1995 (aged 28)
Geoffrey Bouchard (FRA)	1 April 1992 (aged 31)
Sam Bennett (IRL)	16 October 1990 (aged 33)
Benoît Cosnefroy (FRA)	17 October 1995 (aged 28)
Dries De Bondt (BEL)	4 July 1991 (aged 32)
Sander De Pestel (BEL)	11 October 1998 (aged 25)
Stan Dewulf (BEL)	20 December 1997 (aged 26)
Felix Gall (AUT)	27 February 1998 (aged 25)
Pierre Gautherat (FRA)	16 January 2003 (aged 20)
Dorian Godon (FRA)	25 May 1996 (aged 27)
Jaakko Hänninen (FIN)	16 April 1997 (aged 26)

Rider	Date of birth
Jordan Labrosse (FRA)	15 September 2002 (aged 21)
Victor Lafay (FRA)	17 January 1996 (aged 27)
Paul Lapeira (FRA)	25 February 2000 (aged 23)
Oliver Naesen (BEL)	16 September 1990 (aged 33)
Ben O'Connor (AUS)	25 November 1995 (aged 28)
Aurélien Paret-Peintre (FRA)	27 February 1996 (aged 27)
Valentin Paret-Peintre (FRA)	14 January 2001 (aged 22)
Nans Peters (FRA)	12 March 1994 (aged 29)
Gianluca Pollefliet (BEL)	28 January 2002 (aged 21)
Nicolas Prodhomme (FRA)	1 February 1997 (aged 26)
Valentin Retailleau (FRA)	18 June 2000 (aged 23)
Damien Touzé (FRA)	7 July 1996 (aged 27)
Bastien Tronchon (FRA)	29 March 2002 (aged 21)
Andrea Vendrame (ITA)	20 July 1994 (aged 29)
Larry Warbasse (USA)	28 January 1990 (aged 33)

== Season victories ==
Date	Race	Competition	Rider	Country	Location	Ref.
10 February	Vuelta a Murcia	UCI Europe Tour	Ben O'Connor (AUS)	Spain	Murcia	
18 February	Tour des Alpes-Maritimes, stage 2	UCI Europe Tour	Benoît Cosnefroy (FRA)	France	Vence	
18 February	Tour des Alpes-Maritimes, overall	UCI Europe Tour	Benoît Cosnefroy (FRA)	France		
21 February	UAE Tour, stage 3	UCI World Tour	Ben O'Connor (AUS)	United Arab Emirates	Jebel Jais	
16 March	Classic Loire Atlantique	UCI Europe Tour	Paul Lapeira (FRA)	France	La Haie-Fouassière	
17 March	Cholet-Pays de la Loire	UCI Europe Tour	Paul Lapeira (FRA)	France	Cholet	
27 March	Paris–Camembert	UCI Europe Tour	Benoît Cosnefroy (FRA)	France	Livarot	
2 April	Tour of the Basque Country, stage 2	UCI World Tour	Paul Lapeira (FRA)	France	Cambo-les-Bains	
10 April	Brabantse Pijl	UCI ProSeries	Benoît Cosnefroy (FRA)	Belgium	Overijse	
19 April	Tour of the Alps, stage 5	UCI ProSeries	Aurélien Paret-Peintre (FRA)	Italy	Levico Terme	
24 April	Tour de Romandie, stage 1	UCI World Tour	Dorian Godon (FRA)	Switzerland	Payerne	
28 April	Tour de Romandie, stage 5	UCI World Tour	Dorian Godon (FRA)	Switzerland	Vernier	
4 May	Grand Prix du Morbihan	UCI ProSeries	Benoît Cosnefroy (FRA)	France	Plumelec	
11 May	Tour du Finistère	UCI Europe Tour	Benoît Cosnefroy (FRA)	France	Quimper	
14 May	Giro d'Italia, stage 10	UCI World Tour	Valentin Paret-Peintre (FRA)	Italy	Cusano Mutri	
15 May	Four Days of Dunkirk, stage 2	UCI ProSeries	Sam Bennett (IRL)	France	Abbeville	
16 May	Four Days of Dunkirk, stage 3	UCI ProSeries	Sam Bennett (IRL)	France	Bouchain	
18 May	Four Days of Dunkirk, stage 5	UCI ProSeries	Sam Bennett (IRL)	France	Cassel	
19 May	Four Days of Dunkirk, stage 6	UCI ProSeries	Sam Bennett (IRL)	France	Dunkirk	
19 May	Four Days of Dunkirk, overall	UCI ProSeries	Sam Bennett (IRL)	France		
23 May	Boucles de la Mayenne, prologue	UCI ProSeries	Benoît Cosnefroy (FRA)	France	Laval	
24 May	Giro d'Italia, stage 19	UCI World Tour	Andrea Vendrame (ITA)	Italy	Sappada	
26 May	Boucles de la Mayenne, stage 3	UCI ProSeries	Valentin Retailleau (FRA)	France	Laval	
11 August	La Polynormande	UCI Europe Tour	Paul Lapeira (FRA)	France	Saint-Martin-de-Landelles	
14 August	Tour du Limousin, stage 2	UCI Europe Tour	Alex Baudin (FRA)	France	Terrasson-Lavilledieu	
16 August	Tour du Limousin, overall	UCI Europe Tour	Alex Baudin (FRA)	France		
22 August	Vuelta a España, stage 6	UCI World Tour	Ben O'Connor (AUS)	Spain	Yunquera	

== National, Continental, and World Champions ==
Date	Discipline	Jersey	Rider	Country	Location	Ref.
16 June	Finnish National Road Race Championships		Jaakko Hänninen (FIN)	Finland	Espoo	
20 June	French National Time Trial Championships		Bruno Armirail (FRA)	France	Saint-Martin-de-Landelles	
23 June	French National Road Race Championships		Paul Lapeira (FRA)	France	Saint-Martin-de-Landelles	
