= 2024 Cofidis (men's team) season =

Cofidis
- 2024 season
- UCI code: COF
- Status: UCI WorldTeam
- Manager: Cédric Vasseur (FRA)
- Based: France
- Bicycles: Look
- Groupset: Shimano

Season victories
- One-day races: 1
- Stage race stages: 4
- Most wins: (Belgium) Milan Fretin (2)

The 2024 season for the Cofidis team is the team's 28th season in existence, and the fifth consecutive year as a UCI WorldTeam.

== Team roster ==
As of 9 January 2024.

Rider	Date of birth
Piet Allegaert (BEL)	20 January 1995 (aged 28)
Stanisław Aniołkowski (POL)	20 January 1997 (aged 26)
Thomas Champion (FRA)	8 September 1999 (aged 24)
Bryan Coquard (FRA)	25 April 1992 (aged 31)
Aimé De Gendt (BEL)	17 June 1994 (aged 29)
Nicolas Debeaumarché (FRA)	24 February 1998 (aged 25)
Kenny Elissonde (FRA)	22 July 1991 (aged 32)
Rubén Fernández (ESP)	1 March 1991 (aged 32)
Eddy Finé (FRA)	20 November 1997 (aged 26)
Milan Fretin (BEL)	19 March 2001 (aged 22)
Simon Geschke (GER)	13 March 1986 (aged 37)
Alexis Gougeard (FRA)	5 March 1993 (aged 30)
Ben Hermans (BEL)	8 June 1986 (aged 37)
Jesús Herrada (ESP)	26 July 1990 (aged 33)
Gorka Izagirre (ESP)	7 October 1987 (aged 36)

Rider	Date of birth
Ion Izagirre (ESP)	4 February 1989 (aged 34)
Oliver Knight (GBR)	25 January 2001 (aged 22)
Jonathan Lastra (ESP)	3 June 1993 (aged 30)
Nolann Mahoudo (FRA)	17 November 2002 (aged 21)
Axel Mariault (FRA)	7 June 1998 (aged 25)
Guillaume Martin (FRA)	9 June 1993 (aged 30)
Christophe Noppe (BEL)	29 November 1994 (aged 29)
Stefano Oldani (ITA)	10 January 1998 (aged 25)
Anthony Perez (FRA)	22 April 1991 (aged 32)
Alexis Renard (FRA)	1 June 1999 (aged 24)
Ludovic Robeet (BEL)	22 May 1994 (aged 29)
Benjamin Thomas (FRA)	12 September 1995 (aged 28)
Hugo Toumire (FRA)	5 October 2001 (aged 22)
Harrison Wood (GBR)	14 June 2000 (aged 23)
Axel Zingle (FRA)	18 December 1998 (aged 25)

== Season victories ==
Date	Race	Competition	Rider	Country	Location	Ref.
8 May	Giro d'Italia, stage 5	UCI World Tour	Benjamin Thomas (FRA)	Italy	Lucca	
12 May	Boucles de l'Aulne	UCI Europe Tour	Axel Zingle (FRA)	France	Châteaulin	
14 May	Four Days of Dunkirk, stage 1	UCI ProSeries	Milan Fretin (BEL)	France	Le Touquet	
10 June	Tour de Suisse, stage 2	UCI World Tour	Bryan Coquard (FRA)	Switzerland	Regensdorf	
21 August	Tour Poitou-Charentes en Nouvelle-Aquitaine, stage 2	UCI Europe Tour	Milan Fretin (BEL)	France	Niort	
