= 2024 Boucles de la Mayenne =

French cycling race

2024 UCI ProSeries

Race details
- Dates: 23–26 May 2024
- Stages: 3 + Prologue
- Distance: 551 km (342.4 mi)
- Winning time: 12h 39' 03"

Results
Jersey awarded to the overall winner	Winner	Alberto Bettiol (ITA)	(EF Education–EasyPost)
	Second	Benoît Cosnefroy (FRA)	(Decathlon–AG2R La Mondiale)
	Third	Axel Zingle (FRA)	(Cofidis)
Jersey awarded to the points classification winner	Points	Emilien Jeannière (FRA)	(Team TotalEnergies)
Jersey awarded to the mountains classification winner	Mountains	Alex Martín (ESP)	(Polti–Kometa)
Jersey awarded to the youth classification winner	Youth	Samuel Watson (GBR)	(Groupama–FDJ)
	Team	(France) Decathlon–AG2R La Mondiale	

The 2024 Boucles de la Mayenne (transl. Loops of the Mayenne) was a road cycling stage race that took place between 23 and 26 May 2024 in the Mayenne department in northwestern France. The race was rated as a category 2.Pro event on the 2024 UCI ProSeries calendar, and was the 49th edition of the Boucles de la Mayenne.

== Teams ==
Eight UCI WorldTeams, nine UCI ProTeams and four UCI Continental teams made up the 21 teams that participated in the race.

UCI WorldTeams

- Arkéa–B&B Hotels
- Cofidis
- Decathlon–AG2R La Mondiale
- EF Education–EasyPost
- Groupama–FDJ
- Movistar Team
- Team Jayco–AlUla
- UAE Team Emirates

UCI ProTeams

- Bingoal WB
- Burgos BH
- Caja Rural–Seguros RGA
- Euskaltel–Euskadi
- Lotto–Dstny
- Polti–Kometa
- Q36.5 Pro Cycling Team
- Team TotalEnergies
- Tudor Pro Cycling Team

UCI Continental Teams

- CIC U Nantes Atlantique
- Nice Métropole Côte d'Azur
- St. Michel–Mavic–Auber93
- Van Rysel–Roubaix

== Route ==
Stage characteristics and winners
Stage	Date	Course	Distance	Type	Stage winner
P	23 May	Laval (Espace Mayenne)	5.5 km (3.4 mi)	Individual time trial	Benoît Cosnefroy (FRA)
1	24 May	Saint-Berthevin to Ernée	167.5 km (104.1 mi)	Hilly stage	Emilien Jeannière (FRA)
2	25 May	Le Ham to Villaines-la-Juhel	208.8 km (129.7 mi)	Hilly stage	Alberto Bettiol (ITA)
3	26 May	Quelaines-Saint-Gault to Laval	169.2 km (105.1 mi)	Hilly stage	Valentin Retailleau (FRA)
Total			551 km (342 mi)		

== Stages ==
=== Prologue ===
23 May 2024 – Laval (Espace Mayenne), 5.5 km (3.4 mi)

Prologue Result
Rank	Rider	Team	Time
1	Benoît Cosnefroy (FRA)	Decathlon–AG2R La Mondiale	6' 49"
2	Ivo Oliveira (POR)	UAE Team Emirates	+ 1"
3	Samuel Watson (GBR)	Groupama–FDJ	+ 3"
4	Alberto Bettiol (ITA)	EF Education–EasyPost	+ 5"
5	Axel Zingle (FRA)	Cofidis	+ 5"
6	Dorian Godon (FRA)	Decathlon–AG2R La Mondiale	+ 6"
7	Pierre Gautherat (FRA)	Decathlon–AG2R La Mondiale	+ 7"
8	Kelland O'Brien (AUS)	Team Jayco–AlUla	+ 9"
9	Iván Romeo (ESP)	Movistar Team	+ 9"
10	Marijn van den Berg (NED)	EF Education–EasyPost	+ 11"

General classification after Prologue
Rank	Rider	Team	Time
1	Benoît Cosnefroy (FRA)	Decathlon–AG2R La Mondiale	6' 49"
2	Ivo Oliveira (POR)	UAE Team Emirates	+ 1"
3	Samuel Watson (GBR)	Groupama–FDJ	+ 3"
4	Alberto Bettiol (ITA)	EF Education–EasyPost	+ 5"
5	Axel Zingle (FRA)	Cofidis	+ 5"
6	Dorian Godon (FRA)	Decathlon–AG2R La Mondiale	+ 6"
7	Pierre Gautherat (FRA)	Decathlon–AG2R La Mondiale	+ 7"
8	Kelland O'Brien (AUS)	Team Jayco–AlUla	+ 9"
9	Iván Romeo (ESP)	Movistar Team	+ 9"
10	Marijn van den Berg (NED)	EF Education–EasyPost	+ 11"

=== Stage 1 ===
24 May 2024 – Saint-Berthevin to Ernée, 167.5 km (104.1 mi)

Stage 1 Result
Rank	Rider	Team	Time
1	Emilien Jeannière (FRA)	Team TotalEnergies	3h 48' 29"
2	Paul Penhoët (FRA)	Groupama–FDJ	+ 0"
3	Axel Zingle (FRA)	Cofidis	+ 0"
4	Alexander Salby (DEN)	Bingoal WB	+ 0"
5	Milan Menten (BEL)	Lotto–Dstny	+ 0"
6	Matteo Moschetti (ITA)	Q36.5 Pro Cycling Team	+ 0"
7	Marijn van den Berg (NED)	EF Education–EasyPost	+ 0"
8	Paul Hennequin (FRA)	Nice Métropole Côte d'Azur	+ 0"
9	Kelland O'Brien (AUS)	Team Jayco–AlUla	+ 0"
10	Ivo Oliveira (POR)	UAE Team Emirates	+ 0"

General classification after Stage 1
Rank	Rider	Team	Time
1	Benoît Cosnefroy (FRA)	Decathlon–AG2R La Mondiale	3h 55' 18"
2	Ivo Oliveira (POR)	UAE Team Emirates	+ 1"
3	Axel Zingle (FRA)	Cofidis	+ 1"
4	Samuel Watson (GBR)	Groupama–FDJ	+ 3"
5	Emilien Jeannière (FRA)	Team TotalEnergies	+ 3"
6	Alberto Bettiol (ITA)	EF Education–EasyPost	+ 5"
7	Dorian Godon (FRA)	Decathlon–AG2R La Mondiale	+ 6"
8	Pierre Gautherat (FRA)	Decathlon–AG2R La Mondiale	+ 7"
9	Kelland O'Brien (AUS)	Team Jayco–AlUla	+ 9"
10	Iván Romeo (ESP)	Movistar Team	+ 9"

=== Stage 2 ===
25 May 2024 – Le Ham to Villaines-la-Juhel, 208.8 km (129.7 mi)

Stage 2 Result
Rank	Rider	Team	Time
1	Alberto Bettiol (ITA)	EF Education–EasyPost	5h 03' 57"
2	Marc Hirschi (SUI)	UAE Team Emirates	+ 17"
3	Alexandre Delettre (FRA)	St. Michel–Mavic–Auber93	+ 17"
4	Benoît Cosnefroy (FRA)	Decathlon–AG2R La Mondiale	+ 17"
5	Paul Penhoët (FRA)	Groupama–FDJ	+ 19"
6	Emilien Jeannière (FRA)	Team TotalEnergies	+ 19"
7	Vincenzo Albanese (ITA)	Arkéa–B&B Hotels	+ 19"
8	Filippo Baroncini (ITA)	UAE Team Emirates	+ 19"
9	Carlos Canal (ESP)	Movistar Team	+ 19"
10	Marijn van den Berg (NED)	EF Education–EasyPost	+ 19"

General classification after Stage 2
Rank	Rider	Team	Time
1	Alberto Bettiol (ITA)	EF Education–EasyPost	8h 59' 07"
2	Benoît Cosnefroy (FRA)	Decathlon–AG2R La Mondiale	+ 23"
3	Axel Zingle (FRA)	Cofidis	+ 28"
4	Samuel Watson (GBR)	Groupama–FDJ	+ 30"
5	Emilien Jeannière (FRA)	Team TotalEnergies	+ 30"
6	Marc Hirschi (SUI)	UAE Team Emirates	+ 33"
7	Dorian Godon (FRA)	Decathlon–AG2R La Mondiale	+ 33"
8	Kelland O'Brien (AUS)	Team Jayco–AlUla	+ 36"
9	Paul Penhoët (FRA)	Groupama–FDJ	+ 37"
10	Marijn van den Berg (NED)	EF Education–EasyPost	+ 38"

=== Stage 3 ===
26 May 2024 – Quelaines-Saint-Gault to Laval, 169.2 km (105.1 mi)

Stage 3 Result
Rank	Rider	Team	Time
1	Valentin Retailleau (FRA)	Decathlon–AG2R La Mondiale	3h 59' 55"
2	Gorka Sorarrain (ESP)	Caja Rural–Seguros RGA	+ 1"
3	Matteo Moschetti (ITA)	Q36.5 Pro Cycling Team	+ 1"
4	Axel Zingle (FRA)	Cofidis	+ 1"
5	Emilien Jeannière (FRA)	Team TotalEnergies	+ 1"
6	Marc Sarreau (FRA)	Groupama–FDJ	+ 1"
7	Jon Aberasturi (ESP)	Euskaltel–Euskadi	+ 1"
8	Valentin Tabellion (FRA)	Van Rysel–Roubaix	+ 1"
9	Clément Venturini (FRA)	Arkéa–B&B Hotels	+ 1"
10	Vincenzo Albanese (ITA)	Arkéa–B&B Hotels	+ 1"

General classification after Stage 3
Rank	Rider	Team	Time
1	Alberto Bettiol (ITA)	EF Education–EasyPost	12h 39' 03"
2	Benoît Cosnefroy (FRA)	Decathlon–AG2R La Mondiale	+ 23"
3	Axel Zingle (FRA)	Cofidis	+ 28"
4	Samuel Watson (GBR)	Groupama–FDJ	+ 30"
5	Emilien Jeannière (FRA)	Team TotalEnergies	+ 30"
6	Marc Hirschi (SUI)	UAE Team Emirates	+ 33"
7	Dorian Godon (FRA)	Decathlon–AG2R La Mondiale	+ 33"
8	Kelland O'Brien (AUS)	Team Jayco–AlUla	+ 36"
9	Paul Penhoët (FRA)	Groupama–FDJ	+ 37"
10	Marijn van den Berg (NED)	EF Education–EasyPost	+ 38"

== Classification leadership table ==
Classification leadership by stage
Stage	Winner	General classification	Points classification	Mountains classification	Young rider classification	Team classification
P	Benoît Cosnefroy	Benoît Cosnefroy	Benoît Cosnefroy	not awarded	Samuel Watson	Decathlon–AG2R La Mondiale
1	Emilien Jeannière	Benoît Cosnefroy	Axel Zingle	David Martín	Samuel Watson	Decathlon–AG2R La Mondiale
2	Alberto Bettiol	Alberto Bettiol	Alberto Bettiol	Alex Martín	Samuel Watson	Decathlon–AG2R La Mondiale
3	Valentin Retailleau	Alberto Bettiol	Emilien Jeannière	Alex Martín	Samuel Watson	Decathlon–AG2R La Mondiale
Final		Alberto Bettiol	Emilien Jeannière	Alex Martín	Samuel Watson	Decathlon–AG2R La Mondiale

== Classification standings ==
Legend
Denotes the winner of the general classification	Denotes the winner of the mountains classification
Denotes the winner of the points classification	Denotes the winner of the young rider classification

=== General classification ===
Final general classification (1–10)
Rank	Rider	Team	Time
1	Alberto Bettiol (ITA)	EF Education–EasyPost	12h 39' 03"
2	Benoît Cosnefroy (FRA)	Decathlon–AG2R La Mondiale	+ 23"
3	Axel Zingle (FRA)	Cofidis	+ 28"
4	Samuel Watson (GBR)	Groupama–FDJ	+ 30"
5	Emilien Jeannière (FRA)	Team TotalEnergies	+ 30"
6	Marc Hirschi (SUI)	UAE Team Emirates	+ 33"
7	Dorian Godon (FRA)	Decathlon–AG2R La Mondiale	+ 33"
8	Kelland O'Brien (AUS)	Team Jayco–AlUla	+ 36"
9	Paul Penhoët (FRA)	Groupama–FDJ	+ 37"
10	Marijn van den Berg (NED)	EF Education–EasyPost	+ 38"

=== Points classification ===
Final points classification (1–10)
Rank	Rider	Team	Points
1	Emilien Jeannière (FRA)	Team TotalEnergies	47
2	Alberto Bettiol (ITA)	EF Education–EasyPost	45
3	Axel Zingle (FRA)	Cofidis	44
4	Benoît Cosnefroy (FRA)	Decathlon–AG2R La Mondiale	41
5	Paul Penhoët (FRA)	Groupama–FDJ	32
6	Valentin Retailleau (FRA)	Decathlon–AG2R La Mondiale	30
7	Gorka Sorarrain (ESP)	Caja Rural–Seguros RGA	30
8	Matteo Moschetti (ITA)	Q36.5 Pro Cycling Team	26
9	Marc Hirschi (SUI)	UAE Team Emirates	24
10	Ivo Oliveira (POR)	UAE Team Emirates	24

=== Mountains classification ===
Final mountains classification (1–10)
Rank	Rider	Team	Points
1	Alex Martín (ESP)	Polti–Kometa	42
2	Artus Jaladeau (FRA)	CIC U Nantes Atlantique	20
3	Jonathan Couanon (FRA)	Nice Métropole Côte d'Azur	16
4	Valentin Retailleau (FRA)	Decathlon–AG2R La Mondiale	13
5	Antoine Hue (FRA)	CIC U Nantes Atlantique	12
6	Mathias Norsgaard (DEN)	Movistar Team	10
7	Jan Maas (NED)	Team Jayco–AlUla	8
8	Erik Fetter (HUN)	Polti–Kometa	7
9	Jérémy Leveau (FRA)	Van Rysel–Roubaix	6
10	Iván Romeo (ESP)	Movistar Team	4

=== Young rider classification ===
Final young rider classification (1–10)
Rank	Rider	Team	Time
1	Samuel Watson (GBR)	Groupama–FDJ	12h 39' 33"
2	Paul Penhoët (FRA)	Groupama–FDJ	+ 7"
3	Carlos Canal (ESP)	Movistar Team	+ 8"
4	Anders Foldager (DEN)	Team Jayco–AlUla	+ 10"
5	Iker Mintegi (ESP)	Euskaltel–Euskadi	+ 34"
6	Javier Serrano (ESP)	Polti–Kometa	+ 36"
7	Nolann Mahoudo (FRA)	Cofidis	+ 45"
8	Jaume Guardeño (ESP)	Caja Rural–Seguros RGA	+ 45"
9	Iván Romeo (ESP)	Movistar Team	+ 2' 13"
10	Thibaud Gruel (FRA)	Groupama–FDJ	+ 11' 44"

=== Team classification ===
Final team classification (1–10)
Rank	Team	Time
1	(France) Decathlon–AG2R La Mondiale	37h 58' 40"
2	(Australia) Team Jayco–AlUla	+ 31"
3	(France) Arkéa–B&B Hotels	+ 33"
4	(France) Cofidis	+ 58"
5	(Switzerland) Tudor Pro Cycling Team	+ 1' 00"
6	(Spain) Caja Rural–Seguros RGA	+ 1' 10"
7	(United Arab Emirates) UAE Team Emirates	+ 1' 27"
8	(Spain) Movistar Team	+ 2' 18"
9	(Belgium) Bingoal WB	+ 2' 29"
10	(Italy) Polti–Kometa	+ 3' 04"
