= 2021 French Road Cycling Cup =

Bicycle competition

The 2021 French Road Cycling Cup was the 30th edition of the French Road Cycling Cup.

The number of events was restored to 16 as many events returned to the calendar after having been cancelled in the 2020 edition due to the COVID-19 pandemic in France. The pandemic strongly impacted the schedule again, as four events have been rescheduled from spring to autumn.

The defending champion from the previous season was Nacer Bouhanni of Arkéa–Samsic.

Despite winning three races, the most of any rider in this edition of the cup, Elia Viviani (Cofidis) finished second to Dorian Godon (AG2R Citroën Team), who won two races and secured five other top-ten finishes. By virtue of winning the individual general classification, Godon also won the young rider classification. AG2R Citroën Team completed the sweep by winning the teams classification, after having led it for all but one round; this was the team's third consecutive win in that classification.

== Events ==
The calendar featured the regular 16 events again, after last season when cancellations due to the COVID-19 pandemic reduced the cup to only eight races.

Date	Event	Winner	Team	Series leader(s)	Leading Team
31 January	Grand Prix La Marseillaise	Aurélien Paret-Peintre (FRA)	AG2R Citroën Team	Aurélien Paret-Peintre (FRA)	AG2R Citroën Team
28 March	Cholet-Pays de la Loire	Elia Viviani (ITA)	Cofidis	Elia Viviani (ITA)	AG2R Citroën Team
4 April	La Roue Tourangelle	Arnaud Démare (FRA)	Groupama–FDJ	Arnaud Démare (FRA)	AG2R Citroën Team
16 May	Tro-Bro Léon	Connor Swift (GBR)	Arkéa–Samsic	Connor Swift (GBR)	Arkéa–Samsic
22 May	Tour du Finistère	Benoît Cosnefroy (FRA)	AG2R Citroën Team	Benoît Cosnefroy (FRA)	AG2R Citroën Team
16 June	Paris–Camembert	Dorian Godon (FRA)	AG2R Citroën Team	Dorian Godon (FRA)	AG2R Citroën Team
15 August	Polynormande	Valentin Madouas (FRA)	Groupama–FDJ	Dorian Godon (FRA)	AG2R Citroën Team
5 September	Tour du Doubs	Dorian Godon (FRA)	AG2R Citroën Team	Dorian Godon (FRA)	AG2R Citroën Team
12 September	Grand Prix de Fourmies	Elia Viviani (ITA)	Cofidis	Dorian Godon (FRA)	AG2R Citroën Team
19 September	Grand Prix d'Isbergues	Elia Viviani (ITA)	Cofidis	Elia Viviani (ITA)	AG2R Citroën Team
21 September (Note: Originally scheduled on 18 March, but rescheduled due to the COVID-19 pandemic.)	Grand Prix de Denain	Jasper Philipsen (BEL)	Alpecin–Fenix	Elia Viviani (ITA)	AG2R Citroën Team
1 October (Note: Originally scheduled on 2 April, but rescheduled due to the COVID-19 pandemic.)	Route Adélie	Arvid de Kleijn (NED)	Rally Cycling	Elia Viviani (ITA)	AG2R Citroën Team
2 October (Note: Originally scheduled on 27 March, but rescheduled due to the COVID-19 pandemic.)	Classic Loire Atlantique	Alan Riou (FRA)	Arkéa–Samsic	Dorian Godon (FRA)	AG2R Citroën Team
9 October (Note: Originally scheduled on 3 October, but rescheduled due to the COVID-19 pandemic.)	Tour de Vendée	Bram Welten (NED)	Arkéa–Samsic	Dorian Godon (FRA)	AG2R Citroën Team
16 October (Note: Originally scheduled on 15 May, but rescheduled due to the COVID-19 pandemic.)	Grand Prix du Morbihan	Arne Marit (BEL)	Sport Vlaanderen–Baloise	Dorian Godon (FRA)	AG2R Citroën Team
17 October (Note: Originally scheduled on 23 May, but rescheduled due to the COVID-19 pandemic.)	Boucles de l'Aulne	Stan Dewulf (BEL)	AG2R Citroën Team	Dorian Godon (FRA)	AG2R Citroën Team

== Final cup standings ==
As of 17 October 2021, after the Boucles de l'Aulne

=== Individual ===
All competing riders were eligible for this classification.

Pos.	Rider	Team	Points
1	Dorian Godon (FRA)	AG2R Citroën Team	191
2	Elia Viviani (ITA)	Cofidis	175
3	Valentin Madouas (FRA)	Groupama–FDJ	138
4	Bram Welten (NED)	Arkéa–Samsic	105
5	Benoît Cosnefroy (FRA)	AG2R Citroën Team	90
6	Arnaud Démare (FRA)	Groupama–FDJ	84
7	Pierre-Luc Périchon (FRA)	Cofidis	77
8	Biniam Girmay (ERI)	Delko/Intermarché–Wanty–Gobert Matériaux	74
9	Jason Tesson (FRA)	St. Michel–Auber93	69
10	Baptiste Planckaert (BEL)	Intermarché–Wanty–Gobert Matériaux	69

=== Young rider classification ===
All riders younger than 25 were eligible for this classification.

Pos.	Rider	Team	Points
1	Dorian Godon (FRA)	AG2R Citroën Team	191
2	Valentin Madouas (FRA)	Groupama–FDJ	138
3	Bram Welten (NED)	Arkéa–Samsic	105
4	Biniam Girmay (ERI)	Delko/Intermarché–Wanty–Gobert Matériaux	74
5	Jason Tesson (FRA)	St. Michel–Auber93	69
6	Stan Dewulf (BEL)	AG2R Citroën Team	50
7	Alan Riou (FRA)	Arkéa–Samsic	50
8	Arne Marit (BEL)	Sport Vlaanderen–Baloise	50
9	Jasper Philipsen (BEL)	Alpecin–Fenix	50
10	Aurélien Paret-Peintre (FRA)	AG2R Citroën Team	50

=== Teams ===
Only French teams were eligible for this classification.

Pos.	Team	Points
1	AG2R Citroën Team	146
2	Arkéa–Samsic	129
3	Cofidis	113
4	Team TotalEnergies	104
5	B&B Hotels p/b KTM	95
6	Groupama–FDJ	93
7	St. Michel–Auber93	67
8	Xelliss–Roubaix–Lille Métropole	61
9	Delko	55
