= 2026 Gran Piemonte =

2026 UCI ProSeries

Race details
- Dates: 8 October 2026
- Stages: 1
- Distance: 185 km (115 mi)
- Winning time: 4h 06' 19"

Results
	Winner	Dorian Godon (FRA)	(Netcompany INEOS)
	Second	Anthon Charmig (DEN)	(Uno-X Mobility)
	Third	Alberto Bettiol (ITA)	(XDS Astana Team)

The 2026 Gran Piemonte was the 110th edition of the Gran Piemonte road cycling one day race, which was held on 8 October 2026 as part of the 2026 UCI ProSeries calendar.

== Teams ==
Fourteen UCI WorldTeams and ten UCI ProTeams made up the twenty-four teams that participated in the race.

UCI WorldTeams

- Alpecin–Premier Tech
- EF Education–EasyPost
- Groupama–FDJ United
- Lotto–Intermarché
- Lidl–Trek
- Movistar Team
- Netcompany INEOS
- NSN Cycling Team
- Red Bull–Bora–Hansgrohe
- Team Bahrain Victorious
- Team Jayco–AlUla
- UAE Team Emirates XRG
- Uno-X Mobility
- XDS Astana Team

UCI ProTeams

- Bardiani–CSF 7 Saber
- Caja Rural–Seguros RGA
- Cofidis
- MBH Bank CSB Telecom Fort
- Pinarello–Q36.5 Pro Cycling Team
- Solution Tech NIPPO Rali
- Team Picnic–PostNL
- Team Polti VisitMalta
- Tudor Pro Cycling Team
- Unibet Rose Rockets

== Results ==
Result
Rank	Rider	Team	Time
1	Dorian Godon (FRA)	Netcompany INEOS	4h 06' 19"
2	Anthon Charmig (DEN)	Uno-X Mobility	+ 0"
3	Alberto Bettiol (ITA)	XDS Astana Team	+ 0"
4	Lukas Nerurkar (GBR)	EF Education–EasyPost	+ 2"
5	Quinten Hermans (BEL)	Pinarello–Q36.5 Pro Cycling Team	+ 2"
6	Fred Wright (GBR)	Pinarello–Q36.5 Pro Cycling Team	+ 2"
7	Afonso Eulálio (POR)	Team Bahrain Victorious	+ 2"
8	Michael Matthews (AUS)	Team Jayco–AlUla	+ 2"
9	Jhonatan Narváez (COL)	UAE Team Emirates XRG	+ 2"
10	Pau Martí (ESP)	NSN Cycling Team	+ 2"
