= 2021 Grand Prix de Denain =

French cycling race

2021 UCI Europe Tour 2021 UCI ProSeries

Race details
- Dates: 21 September 2021
- Stages: 1
- Distance: 200.3 km (124.5 mi)
- Winning time: 4h 40' 44"

Results
	Winner	Jasper Philipsen (BEL)	(Alpecin–Fenix)
	Second	Jordi Meeus (BEL)	(Bora–Hansgrohe)
	Third	Ben Swift (GBR)	(Ineos Grenadiers)

The 2021 Grand Prix de Denain – Porte du Hainaut was the 62nd edition of the Grand Prix de Denain, a one-day road cycling race in and around Denain in northern France. This edition was the race's first in the UCI ProSeries; the 2020 edition was expected to feature in the inaugural UCI ProSeries but was cancelled due to the COVID-19 pandemic. It was also the eleventh event of the 2021 French Road Cycling Cup. Additionally, the race was originally due to be held on 18 March but was postponed by COVID-19 precautions.

== Teams ==
Eight of the 19 UCI WorldTeams, nine UCI ProTeams, and two UCI Continental teams made up the nineteen teams that participated in the race. Ineos Grenadiers, with six riders, was the only team to not enter a full squad of seven riders. In total, 132 riders started the race, of which 86 finished.

UCI WorldTeams

- AG2R Citroën Team
- Bora–Hansgrohe
- Cofidis
- EF Education–Nippo
- Groupama–FDJ
- Ineos Grenadiers
- Intermarché–Wanty–Gobert Matériaux
- Israel Start-Up Nation

UCI ProTeams

- Alpecin–Fenix
- Arkéa–Samsic
- B&B Hotels p/b KTM
- Bingoal Pauwels Sauces WB
- Delko
- Rally Cycling
- Sport Vlaanderen–Baloise
- Team TotalEnergies
- Uno-X Pro Cycling Team

UCI Continental Teams

- St. Michel–Auber93
- Xelliss–Roubaix–Lille Métropole

== Result ==
Result
Rank	Rider	Team	Time
1	Jasper Philipsen (BEL)	Alpecin–Fenix	4h 40' 44"
2	Jordi Meeus (BEL)	Bora–Hansgrohe	+ 0"
3	Ben Swift (GBR)	Ineos Grenadiers	+ 0"
4	Hugo Hofstetter (FRA)	Israel Start-Up Nation	+ 0"
5	Tom Van Asbroeck (BEL)	Israel Start-Up Nation	+ 0"
6	Arnaud Démare (FRA)	Groupama–FDJ	+ 0"
7	Kenneth Van Rooy (BEL)	Sport Vlaanderen–Baloise	+ 0"
8	Baptiste Planckaert (BEL)	Intermarché–Wanty–Gobert Matériaux	+ 0"
9	Piet Allegaert (BEL)	Cofidis	+ 0"
10	Jens Debusschere (BEL)	B&B Hotels p/b KTM	+ 0"
