= 2024 Milano–Torino =

105th edition of the Milano–Torino cycling classic

- 2024 UCI ProSeries

Race details
- Dates: 13 March 2024
- Stages: 1
- Distance: 177 km (110.0 mi)
- Winning time: 3h 54' 13"

Results
	Winner	Alberto Bettiol (ITA)	(EF Education–EasyPost)
	Second	Jan Christen (SUI)	(UAE Team Emirates)
	Third	Marc Hirschi (SUI)	(UAE Team Emirates)

The 2024 Milano–Torino was the 105th edition of the Milano–Torino cycling classic. It was held on 13 March 2024 as a category 1.Pro race on the 2024 UCI ProSeries calendar.

The race began in Rho, on the outskirts of Milan, and finished in Salassa, on the outskirts of Turin

== Teams ==
Nine of the 18 UCI WorldTeams and nine UCI ProTeams made up the 18 teams that participated in the race. Of these teams, all entered a full squad of seven riders except for Uno-X Mobility who entered six riders. Of the 125 entries, 119 finished, while only three riders did not and three others did not start.

UCI WorldTeams

- Arkéa–B&B Hotels
- Astana Qazaqstan Team
- Bora–Hansgrohe
- Cofidis
- EF Education–EasyPost
- Intermarché–Wanty
- Movistar Team
- Team dsm–firmenich PostNL
- UAE Team Emirates

UCI ProTeams

- Bingoal WB
- Israel–Premier Tech
- Polti–Kometa
- Q36.5 Pro Cycling Team
- Team Corratec–Vini Fantini
- Team TotalEnergies
- Tudor Pro Cycling Team
- Uno-X Mobility
- VF Group–Bardiani–CSF–Faizanè

== Result ==
Result (1–10)
Rank	Rider	Team	Time
1	Alberto Bettiol (ITA)	EF Education–EasyPost	3h 54' 13"
2	Jan Christen (SUI)	UAE Team Emirates	+ 7"
3	Marc Hirschi (SUI)	UAE Team Emirates	+ 9"
4	Diego Ulissi (ITA)	UAE Team Emirates	+ 9"
5	Kevin Vermaerke (USA)	Team dsm–firmenich PostNL	+ 9"
6	Gianluca Brambilla (ITA)	Q36.5 Pro Cycling Team	+ 9"
7	Emil Herzog (GER)	Bora–Hansgrohe	+ 9"
8	Martin Marcellusi (ITA)	VF Group–Bardiani–CSF–Faizanè	+ 9"
9	Nick Schultz (AUS)	Israel–Premier Tech	+ 9"
10	Frederik Wandahl (DEN)	Bora–Hansgrohe	+ 9"
