= 2023 Giro del Veneto =

2023 UCI ProSeries

Race details
- Dates: 11 October 2023
- Stages: 1
- Distance: 170.12 km (105.7 mi)
- Winning time: 3h 43' 05"

Results
	Winner	Dorian Godon (FRA)	(AG2R Citroën Team)
	Second	Tobias Halland Johannessen (NOR)	(Uno-X Pro Cycling Team)
	Third	Florian Vermeersch (BEL)	(Lotto–Dstny)

The 2023 Giro del Veneto was the 86th edition of the Giro del Veneto single-day cycling race. It was held on 11 October 2023, over a distance of 170.12 km, starting in Tombolo and ending in Vicenza.

The race was won by Dorian Godon of AG2R Citroën Team.

== Teams ==
Seven UCI WorldTeams, seven UCI ProTeams, and six UCI Continental teams made up the twenty teams that participated in the race.

UCI WorldTeams

- AG2R Citroën Team
- Alpecin–Deceuninck
- Arkéa–Samsic
- Astana Qazaqstan Team
- Lidl–Trek
- Team Jayco–AlUla
- UAE Team Emirates

UCI ProTeams

- Eolo–Kometa
- Green Project–Bardiani–CSF–Faizanè
- Israel–Premier Tech
- Lotto–Dstny
- Q36.5 Pro Cycling Team
- Tudor Pro Cycling Team
- Uno-X Pro Cycling Team

UCI Continental teams

- Biesse–Carrera
- General Store–Essegibi–Fratelli Curia
- GW Shimano–Sidermec
- MG.K vis Colors for Peace
- Maloja Pushbikers
- Work Service–Vitalcare–Dynatek

== Results ==
Result
Rank	Rider	Team	Time
1	Dorian Godon (FRA)	AG2R Citroën Team	3h 43' 05"
2	Tobias Halland Johannessen (NOR)	Uno-X Pro Cycling Team	+ 0"
3	Florian Vermeersch (BEL)	Lotto–Dstny	+ 0"
4	Corbin Strong (NZL)	Israel–Premier Tech	+ 0"
5	Marc Hirschi (SUI)	UAE Team Emirates	+ 0"
6	Luca Mozzato (ITA)	Arkéa–Samsic	+ 0"
7	Samuele Battistella (ITA)	Astana Qazaqstan Team	+ 3"
8	Matis Louvel (FRA)	Arkéa–Samsic	+ 3"
9	Andreas Kron (DEN)	Lotto–Dstny	+ 3"
10	Gianluca Brambilla (ITA)	Q36.5 Pro Cycling Team	+ 3"
