= Dorian Godon =

French road cyclist

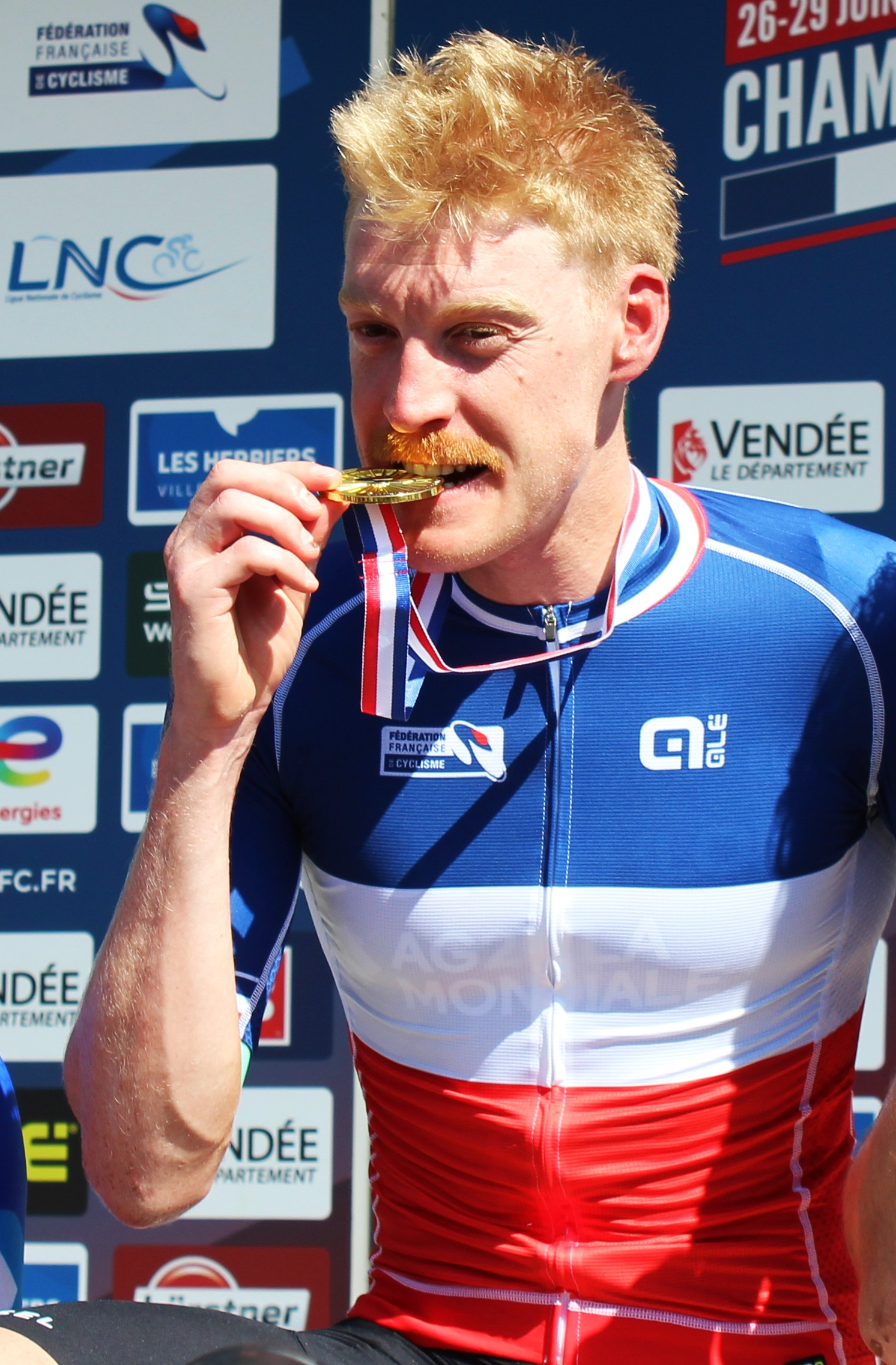
- Godon at the 2025 French National Road Race Championships

Personal information
- Born: 25 May 1996 (age 30) Vitry-sur-Seine, France
- Height: 1.89 m (6 ft 2 in)
- Weight: 77 kg (170 lb)

Cycling career
- Sport: Cycling
- Current team: Netcompany–Ineos
- Discipline: Road
- Role: Rider
- Rider type: Puncheur Sprinter

Amateur team
- 2015–2016: Vulco–VC Vaulx-en-Velin

Professional teams
- 2016: Cofidis (stagiaire)
- 2017–2018: Cofidis
- 2019–2025: AG2R La Mondiale
- 2026–: Netcompany INEOS

Major wins
- One-day races and Classics National Road Race Championships (2025) Brabantse Pijl (2023) Coppa Bernocchi (2025) Giro del Veneto (2023) Gran Piemonte (2026)

Dorian Godon (born 25 May 1996) is a French professional racing cyclist who rides for UCI WorldTeam Netcompany–Ineos.

== Career ==
After riding as a stagiaire the previous season, Godon turned professional with UCI WorldTeam Cofidis in 2017. He took his first professional win the year after, taking the prologue of the Boucles de la Mayenne.

=== AG2R La Mondiale ===
He repeated this result the year after, after having moved teams to AG2R La Mondiale. In 2019, he also entered his first Grand Tour: the Vuelta a España, where he placed third on stage six. The following year, he won Paris–Camembert and again competed in the Vuelta. Godon took three victories in 2021, taking the Tour du Doubs and defending his title at Paris–Camembert. In the process, he captured the overall title for the French Road Cycling Cup, and also competed in his first Tour de France.

In April 2023, he took the biggest win of his career, winning the Brabantse Pijl in a two-man sprint against Ben Healy, becoming the fifth Frenchman to win in the race. In October, he won another UCI ProSeries event, taking the Giro del Veneto in a six-man sprint finish.

A year later, he won his first UCI WorldTour race in a one-two finish with teammate Andrea Vendrame on stage one of the Tour de Romandie. He won again on the fifth and final stage, also taking the points classification in the process.

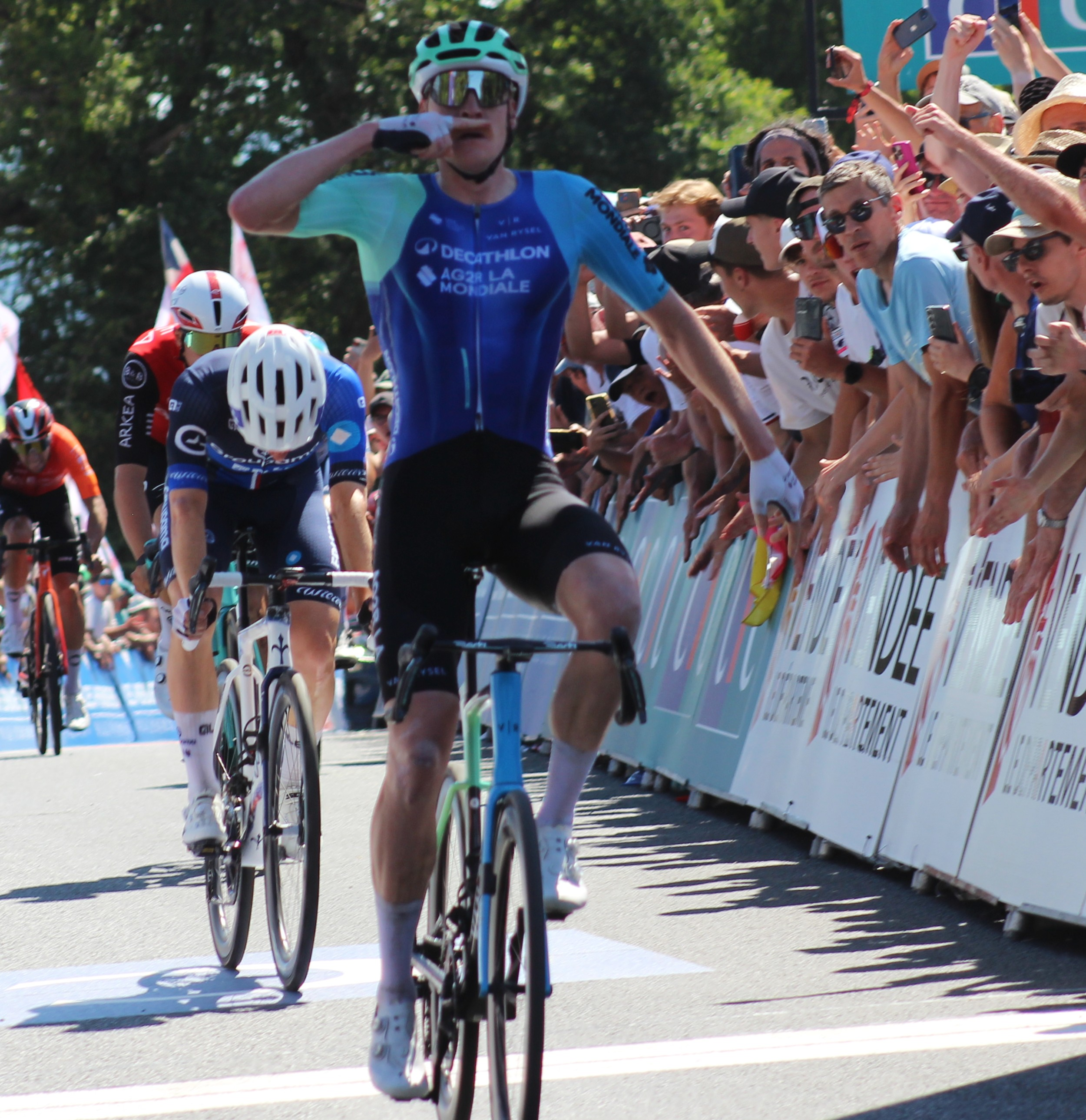
Godon taking victory at the 2025 French National Road Race Championships

In June 2025, Godon won the road race at the French National Road Race Championships in Les Herbiers, ensuring that the national champion's jersey remained within the Decathlon–AG2R La Mondiale team following Paul Lapeira's victory the previous year.

In August, he won stages two and four of the Tour Poitou-Charentes en Nouvelle-Aquitaine, finishing second overall in the general classification. Later that season, he also won the Coppa Bernocchi and the Tour de Vendée.

=== Ineos Grenadiers ===
On 26 August 2025, Godon signed a three-year contract with UCI WorldTeam Netcompany INEOS ahead of the 2026 season, after not being retained by AG2R.

In March 2026, he won stage three of Paris–Nice, a team time trial with his new teammates.

== Major results ==
=== Gravel ===
2025
UCI World Series

1st Millau
2nd Girona

=== Road ===
2014
4th Road race, National Junior Championships
4th Overall Tour du Valromey
2016
2nd Trofeo Almar
2017
2nd Ronde van Limburg
2018 (1 pro win)
7th Overall Boucles de la Mayenne

1st Prologue

9th Overall Tour du Haut Var
2019 (1)
6th Overall Boucles de la Mayenne

1st Young rider classification
1st Prologue

10th Tour du Finistère
10th Grand Prix d'Isbergues
2020 (1)
1st Paris–Camembert
2021 (3)
1st Overall French Cup
1st Paris–Camembert
1st Tour du Doubs
1st Stage 2 Tour de Limousin
3rd Classic Loire Atlantique
4th Grand Prix de Wallonie
4th Cholet-Pays de la Loire
4th Polynormande
5th Ardèche Classic
5nd Grand Prix du Morbihan
6th La Drôme Classic
10th Tour de Vendée
2022
2nd Route Adélie
5th Tour du Jura
2023 (2)
1st Brabantse Pijl
1st Giro del Veneto
10th La Drôme Classic
2024 (2)
Tour de Romandie

1st Points classification
1st Stages 1 & 5

6th Bretagne Classic
7th Overall Boucles de la Mayenne
8th La Flèche Wallonne
8th Coppa Bernocchi
10th La Drôme Classic
2025 (6)
1st Road race, National Championships
1st Coppa Bernocchi
1st Tour de Vendée
1st Stage 2 Tour des Alpes-Maritimes
2nd Overall Tour Poitou-Charentes en Nouvelle-Aquitaine

1st Points classification
1st Stages 2 & 4

6th La Drôme Classic
7th Bretagne Classic
8th Paris–Tours
10th Overall Tour de la Provence
2026 (7)
1st Gran Piemonte
1st Gran Premio del Lazio
Volta a Catalunya

1st Points classification
1st Stages 1 & 3

Tour de Romandie

1st Prologue & Stage 3

Paris–Nice

1st Stages 3 (TTT) & 7

5th Coppa Bernocchi
6th Overall Giro d'Abruzzo

1st Points classification

6th La Drôme Classic
10th Memorial Marco Pantani

==== Grand Tour general classification results timeline ====
Grand Tour	2019	2020	2021	2022	2023	2024	2025
Giro d'Italia	—	—	—	—	—	—	84
Tour de France	—	—	75	—	—	82	—
Vuelta a España	77	38	—	—	51	—	—

==== Classics results timeline ====
Monument	2017	2018	2019	2020	2021	2022	2023	2024	2025	2026
Milan–San Remo	—	—	92	—	—	—	—	—	—	—
Tour of Flanders	—	—	86	—	—	—	—	—	—	—
Paris–Roubaix	—	—	68	NH	—	—	—	—	—	—
Liège–Bastogne–Liège	—	—	—	56	86	DNF	—	—	—	—
Giro di Lombardia	—	—	—	—	—	—	—	—	—	—
Classic	2017	2018	2019	2020	2021	2022	2023	2024	2025	2026
Brabantse Pijl	—	61	—	17	54	15	1	23	—	—
Amstel Gold Race	—	—	—	NH	45	34	DNF	36	44	13
La Flèche Wallonne	—	—	—	79	58	73	—	8	56	60
Bretagne Classic	—	—	—	26	16	—	—	6	7	—
Coppa Bernocchi	—	—	—	NH	—	—	—	8	1	5
Gran Piemonte	NH	—	—	—	—	—	—	—	—	1
Paris–Tours	154	—	—	—	—	41	60	—	8	

Legend
—	Did not compete
DNF	Did not finish
