= Alberto Bettiol =

Italian road racing cyclist

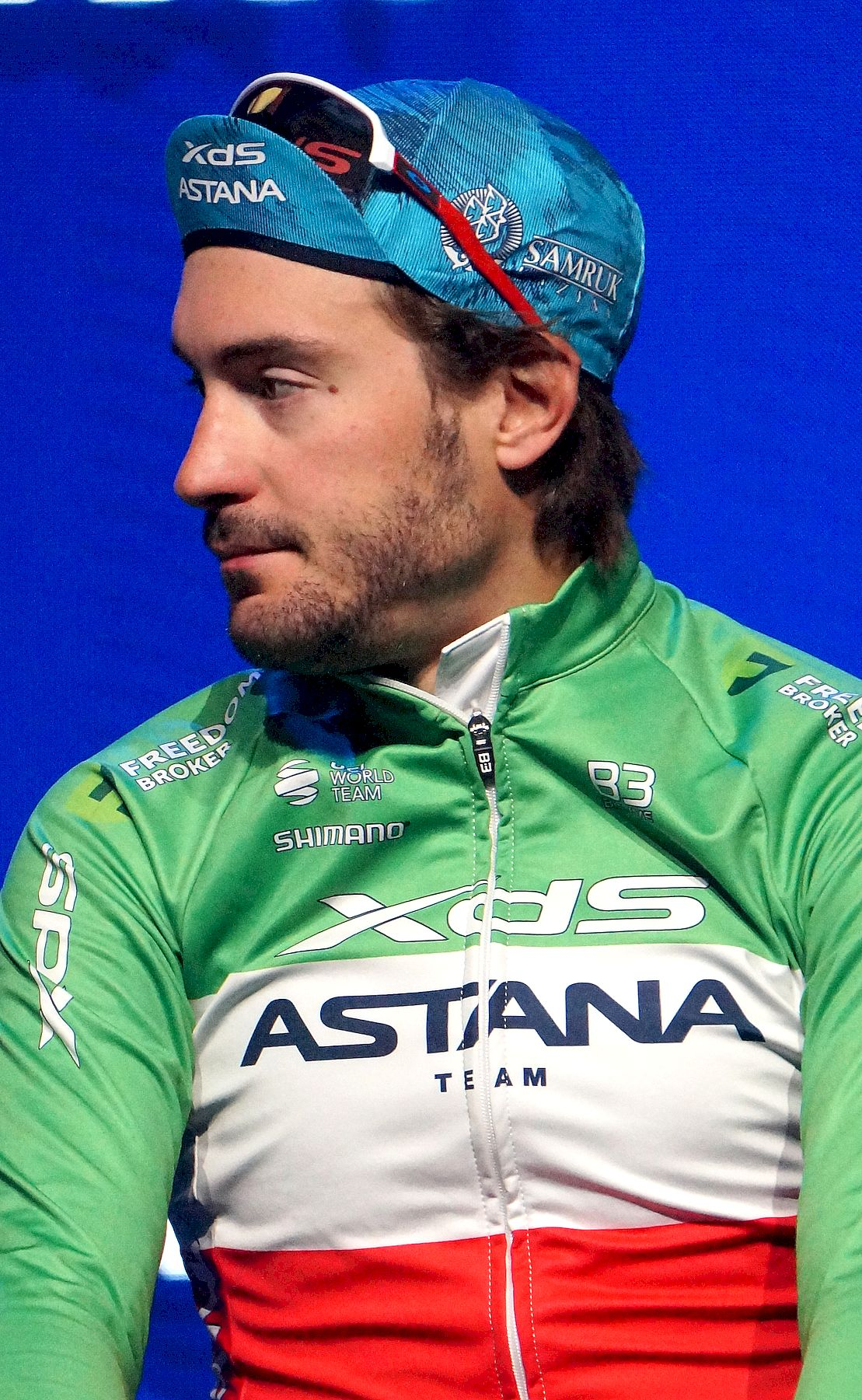
- Bettiol in 2025

Personal information
- Full name: Alberto Bettiol
- Born: 29 October 1993 (age 32) Poggibonsi, Italy
- Height: 1.80 m (5 ft 11 in)
- Weight: 69 kg (152 lb)

Cycling career
- Sport: Cycling
- Current team: XDS Astana Team
- Discipline: Road
- Role: Rider
- Rider type: Puncheur; Classics specialist

Amateur teams
- 2012: Idea Shoes-M.C.S.-Madras
- 2013: Mastromarco-Sensi-Benedetti-Dover

Professional teams
- 2014: Cannondale
- 2015–2017: Cannondale–Garmin
- 2018: BMC Racing Team
- 2019–2024: EF Education First
- 2024–: Astana Qazaqstan Team

Major wins
- Grand Tours Giro d'Italia 2 individual stages (2021, 2026) Stage races Boucles de la Mayenne (2024) One-day races and Classics National Road Race Championships (2024) Tour of Flanders (2019) Milano–Torino (2024)

Alberto Bettiol (born 29 October 1993) is an Italian professional road racing cyclist, who currently rides for UCI WorldTeam XDS Astana Team. Bettiol turned professional in 2014, with his first professional win coming at the 2019 Tour of Flanders. He competed at the 2020 Summer Olympics, in the road race, and time trial.

== Career ==
Born on 29 October 1993, in Poggibonsi, Tuscany, Bettiol resides in Castelfiorentino, Tuscany, Italy.

Bettiol signed with Cannondale, a UCI ProTeam, for the 2014 season.

He signed with Cannondale–Garmin, another UCI ProTeam, for the 2015 season.

He was named in the start list for the 2016 Giro d'Italia, also finishing second in the Bretagne Classic that season. He was named in the startlist for the 2017 Tour de France.

=== 2019 ===
After spending the 2018 season in BMC Racing Team, he returned to his previous team (now called EF Education First Pro Cycling).

After a strong performance at the Tirreno–Adriatico, most notably finishing 3rd on the second stage and 2nd on the final stage (an individual time trial), he won his first professional race at the Tour of Flanders, one of cycling's five monuments. Following a successful solo attack on the second to last climb of the race, Oude Kwaremont, he managed to keep the gap to the chasing group which included several of the pre-race favorites, including previous winners Alexander Kristoff and Peter Sagan, for the remaining 17 km.

=== 2021–present ===
In 2021, Bettiol won his first Grand Tour stage on day 18 of the Giro d'Italia in a solo fashion seventeen seconds ahead of the chase group. In 2022, Bettiol took no victories but did place eighth in the road race at the UCI Road World Championships. He also won the combativity award for stage ten of the Tour de France, after attacking from the breakaway before being caught with nine kilometers remaining.

The following season, he took a very early season win, capturing the 5.5 kilometer prologue of the Tour Down Under by eight seconds. In March 2024, he won Milano–Torino from a 30 kilometer solo ride, followed by taking fifth at Milan–San Remo three days later.

== Major results ==
2011
1st Time trial, UEC European Junior Road Championships
1st Overall Giro della Lunigiana

1st Points classification
1st Stages 1 & 3

2013
National Under-23 Road Championships

3rd Road race
5th Time trial

3rd Trofeo Franco Balestra
3rd Gran Premio della Liberazione
4th Overall Coupe des nations Ville Saguenay
7th Road race, UEC European Under-23 Road Championships
10th Ronde Van Vlaanderen Beloften
2015
10th Gran Piemonte
2016
2nd Bretagne Classic
3rd Overall Tour de Pologne

1st Points classification

4th Grand Prix Cycliste de Québec
7th Grand Prix Cycliste de Montréal
10th Gran Piemonte
2017
4th Coppa Ugo Agostoni
5th Gran Premio Bruno Beghelli
6th Clásica de San Sebastián
10th E3 Harelbeke
2018
1st Stage 1 (TTT) Tirreno–Adriatico
2019 (1 pro win)
1st Tour of Flanders
National Road Championships

2nd Time trial
3rd Road race

4th E3 Binckbank Classic
6th Brabantse Pijl
2020 (1)
2nd Overall Étoile de Bessèges

1st Stage 5 (ITT)

4th Strade Bianche
4th Gent–Wevelgem
2021 (1)
1st Stage 18 Giro d'Italia
2022
2nd Overall Étoile de Bessèges
5th Gran Piemonte
8th Road race, UCI Road World Championships
8th Grand Prix Cycliste de Québec
10th Grand Prix La Marseillaise
Combativity award Stage 10 Tour de France
2023 (1)
1st Prologue Tour Down Under
10th Road race, UCI Road World Championships
2024 (4)
1st Road race, National Road Championships
1st Overall Boucles de la Mayenne

1st Stage 2

1st Milano–Torino
2nd Grand Prix of Aargau Canton
3rd Overall Étoile de Bessèges
5th Milan–San Remo
5th Trofeo Calvià
9th Tour of Flanders
10th Overall Renewi Tour
10th Trofeo Pollença–Port d'Andratx
2025
3rd Grand Prix Cycliste de Québec
6th Overall Tour de Pologne
7th Trofeo Laigueglia
8th Overall Renewi Tour
10th Grand Prix Cycliste de Montréal
2026 (1)
1st Stage 13 Giro d'Italia
3rd Gran Piemonte
9th Overall Tour de Pologne

=== Grand Tour general classification results timeline ===
Grand Tour	2016	2017	2018	2019	2020	2021	2022	2023	2024	2025	2026
Giro d'Italia	86	—	—	—	—	30	—	48	—	—	63
Tour de France	—	90	—	69	62	—	41	83	DNF	—	—
Vuelta a España	—	—	—	—	—	—	—	—	—	—	—

=== Classics results timeline ===
Monuments	2014	2015	2016	2017	2018	2019	2020	2021	2022	2023	2024	2025	2026
Milan–San Remo	—	—	—	37	95	36	18	109	131	54	5	57	103
Tour of Flanders	—	—	DNF	24	DNF	1	16	28	DNF	—	9	—	24
Paris–Roubaix	—	—	—	—	—	—	—	—	—	—	DNF	—	—
Liège–Bastogne–Liège	DNF	—	—	—	DNF	DNF	DNF	—	69	—	—	—	—
Giro di Lombardia	—	89	DNF	DNF	DNF	—	DNF	—	—	—	—	—	
Classic	2014	2015	2016	2017	2018	2019	2020	2021	2022	2023	2024	2025	2026
Strade Bianche	97	DNF	—	DNF	DNF	78	4	23	—	DNF	24	DNF	103
Milano–Torino	—	DNF	—	—	DNF	—	—	—	39	61	1	42	DNF
E3 Harelbeke	—	—	DNF	10	DNF	4	NH	44	—	15	DNF	—	DNF
Gent–Wevelgem	—	—	DNF	32	121	DNF	4	DNF	—	DNF	—	—	—
Brabantse Pijl	—	DNF	53	16	—	6	—	—	DNF	—	—	—	—
Clásica de San Sebastián	DNF	—	—	6	—	—	NH	—	DNF	12	—	—	—
Bretagne Classic	—	32	2	49	DNF	—	—	—	—	DNF	—	—	55
Grand Prix Cycliste de Quebec	—	—	4	15	—	12	Not held		8	DNF	20	3	22
Grand Prix Cycliste de Montréal	—	—	7	54	—	51	Not held		47	DNF	DNF	10	12
Gran Piemonte	NH	10	10	—	46	—	—	—	5	—	68	63	3

Legend
—	Did not compete
DNF	Did not finish
IP	In Progress
NH	Not held
