= 2025 Coppa Bernocchi =

- 2025 UCI ProSeries

Race details
- Dates: 6 October 2025
- Stages: 1
- Distance: 191.6 km (119.1 mi)
- Winning time: 4h 13' 09"

Results
	Winner	Dorian Godon (FRA)	(Decathlon–AG2R La Mondiale)
	Second	Tobias Lund Andresen (DEN)	(Team Picnic–PostNL)
	Third	Giovanni Lonardi (ITA)	(Team Polti VisitMalta)

The 2025 Coppa Bernocchi (also known as the Coppa Bernocchi – GP Banco BPM for sponsorship reasons) was the 106th edition of the Coppa Bernocchi road cycling one day race, which was held in and around Legnano, Italy, on 6 October 2025.

== Teams ==
Fifteen UCI WorldTeams, seven UCI ProTeams, and two UCI Continental team made up the twenty-four teams that participated in the race.

UCI WorldTeams

- Alpecin–Deceuninck
- Cofidis
- Decathlon–AG2R La Mondiale
- EF Education–EasyPost
- Intermarché–Wanty
- Lidl–Trek
- Movistar Team
- Red Bull–Bora–Hansgrohe
- Soudal–Quick-Step
- Team Bahrain Victorious
- Team Jayco–AlUla
- Team Picnic–PostNL
- UAE Team Emirates XRG
- Visma–Lease a Bike
- XDS Astana Team

UCI ProTeams

- Burgos Burpellet BH
- Q36.5 Pro Cycling Team
- Team Polti VisitMalta
- Tudor Pro Cycling Team
- Team Solution Tech–Vini Fantini
- Uno-X Mobility
- VF Group–Bardiani–CSF–Faizanè

UCI Continental Teams

- JCL Team Ukyo
- MBH Bank Ballan CSB

== Results ==
Result
Rank	Rider	Team	Time
1	Dorian Godon (FRA)	Decathlon–AG2R La Mondiale	4h 13' 09"
2	Tobias Lund Andresen (DEN)	Team Picnic–PostNL	+ 0"
3	Giovanni Lonardi (ITA)	Team Polti VisitMalta	+ 0"
4	Andrea Raccagni (ITA)	Soudal–Quick-Step	+ 0"
5	Michael Matthews (AUS)	Team Jayco–AlUla	+ 0"
6	Matteo Trentin (ITA)	Tudor Pro Cycling Team	+ 0"
7	Fred Wright (GBR)	Team Bahrain Victorious	+ 0"
8	Filippo Magli (ITA)	VF Group–Bardiani–CSF–Faizanè	+ 0"
9	Markus Hoelgaard (NOR)	Uno-X Mobility	+ 0"
10	Francesco Busatto (ITA)	Intermarché–Wanty	+ 0"
