= 2026 Tour of Belgium =

2026 UCI ProSeries

Race details
- Dates: 17–21 June 2026
- Stages: 5
- Distance: 925.6 km (575.1 mi)
- Winning time: 20h 43' 26"

Results
Jersey awarded to the overall winner	Winner	Jasper Philipsen (BEL)	(Alpecin–Premier Tech)
	Second	Jenno Berckmoes (BEL)	(Lotto–Intermarché)
	Third	Alex Aranburu (ESP)	(Cofidis)
Jersey awarded to the points classification winner	Points	Jasper Philipsen (BEL)	(Alpecin–Premier Tech)
Jersey awarded to the young rider classification winner	Young rider	Héctor Álvarez (ESP)	(Lidl–Trek)
Jersey awarded to the combativity classification winner	Combativity	Victor Hannes (BEL)	(Aarco)
	Team	(Belgium) Alpecin–Premier Tech	

The 2026 Tour of Belgium (known as the 2026 Baloise Belgium Tour for sponsorship purposes) was the 95th edition of the Tour of Belgium road cycling stage race, which took place between 17 and 21 June 2026. The category 2.Pro event forms a part of the 2026 UCI ProSeries.

== Teams ==
Eleven UCI WorldTeams, six UCI ProTeams, four UCI Continental Teams and two UCI Cyclo-cross teams made up the 23 teams that participated in the race.

UCI WorldTeams

- Alpecin–Premier Tech
- Decathlon CMA CGM
- Lidl–Trek
- Lotto–Intermarché
- Movistar Team
- NSN Cycling Team
- Soudal–Quick-Step
- Team Picnic–PostNL
- UAE Team Emirates XRG
- Uno-X Mobility
- XDS Astana Team

UCI ProTeams

- Cofidis
- Pinarello–Q36.5 Pro Cycling Team
- Team Flanders–Baloise
- Team TotalEnergies
- Tudor Pro Cycling Team
- Unibet Rose Rockets

UCI Continental Teams

- Aarco
- BEAT CC p/b Saxo
- Metec–Solarwatt p/b Mantel
- Tarteletto–Isorex

UCI Cyclo-cross Teams

- Baloise Verzekeringen–Het Poetsbureau Lions
- Pauwels Sauzen–Altez Industriebouw Cycling Team

== Route ==
It was reported in March 2026 that Dwars door het Hageland race will be absorbed into Baloise Belgium Tour as one of the stages, with alteration to its current route; however in April it was announced that the plan to include the route with gravel roads, which was the feature of the one day race, were vetoed by UCI. It was finally included as stage 4 of the Tour after further revisions, mainly removing the iconic gravel sections of the route, and ending the stage in Aarschot which was originally the start location of Dwars door het Hageland.

Stage characteristics and winners
Stage	Date	Course	Distance	Type	Stage winner
1	17 June	Scherpenheuvel-Zichem to Scherpenheuvel-Zichem	187.9 km (116.8 mi)	Hilly stage	Biniam Girmay (ERI)
2	18 June	Merelbeke-Melle to Knokke-Heist	197.6 km (122.8 mi)	Flat stage	Tim Merlier (BEL)
3	19 June	Durbuy to Durbuy	173 km (107 mi)	Hilly stage	Alex Aranburu (ESP)
4	20 June	Begijnendijk-Betekom to Aarschot	183.5 km (114.0 mi)	Hilly stage	Olav Kooij (NED)
5	21 June	Gingelom to Hoeilaart	183.6 km (114.1 mi)	Hilly stage	Jasper Philipsen (BEL)
Total			925.6 km (575.1 mi)		

== Stages ==
=== Stage 1 ===
17 June 2026 — Scherpenheuvel-Zichem to Scherpenheuvel-Zichem, 187.9 km (116.8 mi)

Stage 1 Result
Rank	Rider	Team	Time
1	Biniam Girmay (ERI)	NSN Cycling Team	4h 05' 50"
2	Tim Merlier (BEL)	Soudal–Quick-Step	+ 0"
3	Max Kanter (GER)	XDS Astana Team	+ 0"
4	Steffen De Schuyteneer (BEL)	Lotto–Intermarché	+ 0"
5	Søren Wærenskjold (NOR)	Uno-X Mobility	+ 0"
6	Arvid de Kleijn (NED)	Tudor Pro Cycling Team	+ 0"
7	Joshua Giddings (GBR)	Lotto–Intermarché	+ 0"
8	Emilien Jeannière (FRA)	Team TotalEnergies	+ 0"
9	Mike Teunissen (NED)	XDS Astana Team	+ 0"
10	Rui Oliveira (POR)	UAE Team Emirates XRG	+ 0"

General classification after Stage 1
Rank	Rider	Team	Time
1	Biniam Girmay (ERI)	NSN Cycling Team	4h 05' 40"
2	Bart Kortleve (NED)	Metec–Solarwatt p/b Mantel	+ 2"
3	Robbe Mellaerts (BEL)	Baloise Verzekeringen–Het Poetsbureau Lions	+ 3"
4	Tim Merlier (BEL)	Soudal–Quick-Step	+ 4"
5	Max Kanter (GER)	XDS Astana Team	+ 6"
6	Wies Nuyens (BEL)	Pauwels Sauzen–Altez Industriebouw Cycling Team	+ 7"
7	Steffen De Schuyteneer (BEL)	Lotto–Intermarché	+ 10"
8	Søren Wærenskjold (NOR)	Uno-X Mobility	+ 10"
9	Arvid de Kleijn (NED)	Tudor Pro Cycling Team	+ 10"
10	Joshua Giddings (GBR)	Lotto–Intermarché	+ 10"

=== Stage 2 ===
18 June 2026 — Merelbeke-Melle to Knokke-Heist, 197.6 km (122.8 mi)

Stage 2 Result
Rank	Rider	Team	Time
1	Tim Merlier (BEL)	Soudal–Quick-Step	4h 18' 31"
2	Olav Kooij (NED)	Decathlon CMA CGM	+ 0"
3	Jasper Philipsen (BEL)	Alpecin–Premier Tech	+ 0"
4	Max Kanter (GER)	XDS Astana Team	+ 0"
5	Emilien Jeannière (FRA)	Team TotalEnergies	+ 0"
6	Jenno Berckmoes (BEL)	Lotto–Intermarché	+ 0"
7	Tom Crabbe (BEL)	Team Flanders–Baloise	+ 0"
8	Jonas Abrahamsen (NOR)	Uno-X Mobility	+ 0"
9	David Dekker (NED)	BEAT CC p/b Saxo	+ 0"
10	Søren Wærenskjold (NOR)	Uno-X Mobility	+ 0"

General classification after Stage 2
Rank	Rider	Team	Time
1	Tim Merlier (BEL)	Soudal–Quick-Step	8h 24' 05"
2	Biniam Girmay (ERI)	NSN Cycling Team	+ 6"
3	Bart Kortleve (NED)	Metec–Solarwatt p/b Mantel	+ 8"
4	Viktor Vandenberghe (BEL)	Pauwels Sauzen–Altez Industriebouw Cycling Team	+ 8"
5	Robbe Mellaerts (BEL)	Baloise Verzekeringen–Het Poetsbureau Lions	+ 9"
6	Olav Kooij (NED)	Decathlon CMA CGM	+ 10"
7	Max Kanter (GER)	XDS Astana Team	+ 12"
8	Jasper Philipsen (BEL)	Alpecin–Premier Tech	+ 12"
9	Victor Broex (NED)	Metec–Solarwatt p/b Mantel	+ 12"
10	Wies Nuyens (BEL)	Pauwels Sauzen–Altez Industriebouw Cycling Team	+ 13"

=== Stage 3 ===
19 June 2026 — Durbuy to Durbuy, 173 km (107 mi)

Stage 3 Result
Rank	Rider	Team	Time
1	Alex Aranburu (ESP)	Cofidis	4h 07' 28"
2	Lewis Askey (GBR)	NSN Cycling Team	+ 0"
3	Carlos Canal (ESP)	Movistar Team	+ 0"
4	Jonas Abrahamsen (NOR)	Uno-X Mobility	+ 0"
5	Matyáš Kopecký (CZE)	Unibet Rose Rockets	+ 0"
6	Jasper Philipsen (BEL)	Alpecin–Premier Tech	+ 0"
7	Alexandre Delettre (FRA)	Team TotalEnergies	+ 0"
8	Emilien Jeannière (FRA)	Team TotalEnergies	+ 0"
9	Davide Toneatti (ITA)	XDS Astana Team	+ 0"
10	Tibor Del Grosso (NED)	Alpecin–Premier Tech	+ 0"

General classification after Stage 3
Rank	Rider	Team	Time
1	Alex Aranburu (ESP)	Cofidis	12h 31' 39"
2	Jenno Berckmoes (BEL)	Lotto–Intermarché	+ 2"
3	Quinten Hermans (BEL)	Pinarello–Q36.5 Pro Cycling Team	+ 3"
4	Lewis Askey (GBR)	NSN Cycling Team	+ 4"
5	Jasper Philipsen (BEL)	Alpecin–Premier Tech	+ 6"
6	Carlos Canal (ESP)	Movistar Team	+ 6"
7	Emilien Jeannière (FRA)	Team TotalEnergies	+ 10"
8	Lukáš Kubiš (SVK)	Unibet Rose Rockets	+ 10"
9	Tibor Del Grosso (NED)	Alpecin–Premier Tech	+ 10"
10	Jonas Abrahamsen (NOR)	Uno-X Mobility	+ 10"

=== Stage 4 ===
20 June 2026 — Begijnendijk-Betekom to Aarschot, 183.5 km (114.0 mi)

Stage 4 Result
Rank	Rider	Team	Time
1	Olav Kooij (NED)	Decathlon CMA CGM	4h 07' 42"
2	Tim Merlier (BEL)	Soudal–Quick-Step	+ 0"
3	Jasper Philipsen (BEL)	Alpecin–Premier Tech	+ 0"
4	Arvid de Kleijn (NED)	Tudor Pro Cycling Team	+ 0"
5	Biniam Girmay (ERI)	NSN Cycling Team	+ 0"
6	Naud De Clercq (BEL)	Pauwels Sauzen–Altez Industriebouw Cycling Team	+ 0"
7	Søren Wærenskjold (NOR)	Uno-X Mobility	+ 0"
8	David Dekker (NED)	BEAT CC p/b Saxo	+ 0"
9	Lukáš Kubiš (SVK)	Unibet Rose Rockets	+ 0"
10	Matyáš Kopecký (CZE)	Unibet Rose Rockets	+ 0"

General classification after Stage 4
Rank	Rider	Team	Time
1	Alex Aranburu (ESP)	Cofidis	16h 39' 21"
2	Jasper Philipsen (BEL)	Alpecin–Premier Tech	+ 2"
3	Jenno Berckmoes (BEL)	Lotto–Intermarché	+ 2"
4	Quinten Hermans (BEL)	Pinarello–Q36.5 Pro Cycling Team	+ 3"
5	Lewis Askey (GBR)	NSN Cycling Team	+ 4"
6	Carlos Canal (ESP)	Movistar Team	+ 6"
7	Emilien Jeannière (FRA)	Team TotalEnergies	+ 10"
8	Lukáš Kubiš (SVK)	Unibet Rose Rockets	+ 10"
9	Jonas Abrahamsen (NOR)	Uno-X Mobility	+ 10"
10	Matyáš Kopecký (CZE)	Unibet Rose Rockets	+ 10"

=== Stage 5 ===
21 June 2026 — Gingelom to Hoeilaart, 183.6 km (114.1 mi)

Stage 5 Result
Rank	Rider	Team	Time
1	Jasper Philipsen (BEL)	Alpecin–Premier Tech	4h 08' 31"
2	Jenno Berckmoes (BEL)	Lotto–Intermarché	+ 0"
3	Max Kanter (GER)	XDS Astana Team	+ 0"
4	Søren Wærenskjold (NOR)	Uno-X Mobility	+ 0"
5	Olav Kooij (NED)	Decathlon CMA CGM	+ 0"
6	Mike Teunissen (NED)	XDS Astana Team	+ 0"
7	Emilien Jeannière (FRA)	Team TotalEnergies	+ 0"
8	Rick Pluimers (NED)	Tudor Pro Cycling Team	+ 0"
9	Tim Torn Teutenberg (GER)	Lidl–Trek	+ 0"
10	Biniam Girmay (ERI)	NSN Cycling Team	+ 0"

General classification after stage 5
Rank	Rider	Team	Time
1	Jasper Philipsen (BEL)	Alpecin–Premier Tech	20h 47' 40"
2	Jenno Berckmoes (BEL)	Lotto–Intermarché	+ 5"
3	Alex Aranburu (ESP)	Cofidis	+ 9"
4	Lewis Askey (GBR)	NSN Cycling Team	+ 14"
5	Quinten Hermans (BEL)	Pinarello–Q36.5 Pro Cycling Team	+ 15"
6	Carlos Canal (ESP)	Movistar Team	+ 18"
7	Lukáš Kubiš (SVK)	Unibet Rose Rockets	+ 20"
8	Emilien Jeannière (FRA)	Team TotalEnergies	+ 21"
9	Jonas Abrahamsen (NOR)	Uno-X Mobility	+ 22"
10	Matyáš Kopecký (CZE)	Unibet Rose Rockets	+ 22"

== Classification leadership table ==
Classification leadership by stage
Stage	Winner	General classification (Dutch: Algemeen klassement)	Points classification (Dutch: Puntenklassement)	Combativity classification (Dutch: Strijdlustklassement)	Young rider classification (Dutch: Jongerenklassement)	Team classification (Dutch: Ploegenklassement)
1	Biniam Girmay	Biniam Girmay	Biniam Girmay	Roy Hoogendoorn	Bart Kortleve	Lotto–Intermarché
2	Tim Merlier	Tim Merlier	Tim Merlier	Victor Hannes	Bart Kortleve	Lotto–Intermarché
3	Alex Aranburu	Alex Aranburu	Tim Merlier	Victor Hannes	Héctor Álvarez	Alpecin–Premier Tech
4	Olav Kooij	Alex Aranburu	Tim Merlier	Victor Hannes	Héctor Álvarez	Alpecin–Premier Tech
5	Jasper Philipsen	Jasper Philipsen	Jasper Philipsen	Victor Hannes	Héctor Álvarez	Alpecin–Premier Tech
Final		Jasper Philipsen	Jasper Philipsen	Victor Hannes	Héctor Álvarez	Alpecin–Premier Tech

== Classification standings ==
Legend
Denotes the winner of the general classification	Denotes the winner of the combativity classification
Denotes the winner of the points classification	Denotes the winner of the young rider classification

=== General classification ===
Final general classification (1–10)
Rank	Rider	Team	Time
1	Jasper Philipsen (BEL)	Alpecin–Premier Tech	20h 43' 26"
2	Jenno Berckmoes (BEL)	Lotto–Intermarché	+ 5"
3	Alex Aranburu (ESP)	Cofidis	+ 9"
4	Lewis Askey (GBR)	NSN Cycling Team	+ 14"
5	Quinten Hermans (BEL)	Pinarello–Q36.5 Pro Cycling Team	+ 15"
6	Carlos Canal (ESP)	Movistar Team	+ 18"
7	Lukáš Kubiš (SVK)	Unibet Rose Rockets	+ 20"
8	Emilien Jeannière (FRA)	Team TotalEnergies	+ 21"
9	Jonas Abrahamsen (NOR)	Uno-X Mobility	+ 22"
10	Matyáš Kopecký (CZE)	Unibet Rose Rockets	+ 22"

=== Points classification ===
Final points classification (1–10)
Rank	Rider	Team	Points
1	Jasper Philipsen (BEL)	Alpecin–Premier Tech	89
2	Tim Merlier (BEL)	Soudal–Quick-Step	80
3	Olav Kooij (NED)	Decathlon CMA CGM	72
4	Max Kanter (GER)	XDS Astana Team	63
5	Søren Wærenskjold (NOR)	Uno-X Mobility	59
6	Biniam Girmay (ERI)	NSN Cycling Team	57
7	Emilien Jeannière (FRA)	Team TotalEnergies	54
8	Jenno Berckmoes (BEL)	Lotto–Intermarché	40
9	Arvid de Kleijn (NED)	Tudor Pro Cycling Team	34
10	Jonas Abrahamsen (NOR)	Uno-X Mobility	31

=== Combativity classification ===
Final combativity classification (1–10)
Rank	Rider	Team	Points
1	Victor Hannes (BEL)	Aarco	97
2	Stijn Appel (NED)	BEAT CC p/b Saxo	83
3	Maxence Place (BEL)	Aarco	39
4	Jonah Killy (USA)	Tarteletto–Isorex	36
5	Olivier Godfroid (BEL)	Baloise Verzekeringen–Het Poetsbureau Lions	29
6	Viktor Vandenberghe (BEL)	Pauwels Sauzen–Altez Industriebouw Cycling Team	25
7	Jarno Bellens (BEL)	Baloise Verzekeringen–Het Poetsbureau Lions	25
8	Victor Broex (NED)	Metec–Solarwatt p/b Mantel	23
9	Jocelyn Baguelin (FRA)	Aarco	21
10	Gianni Marchand (BEL)	Tarteletto–Isorex	21

=== Young rider classification ===
Final young rider classification (1–10)
Rank	Rider	Team	Time
1	Héctor Álvarez (ESP)	Lidl–Trek	20h 43' 59"
2	Antoine L'Hote (FRA)	Decathlon CMA CGM	+ 3' 06"
3	Viktor Vandenberghe (BEL)	Pauwels Sauzen–Altez Industriebouw Cycling Team	+ 9' 56"
4	Ryan Gal (NED)	Metec–Solarwatt p/b Mantel	+ 12' 07"
5	Wies Nuyens (BEL)	Pauwels Sauzen–Altez Industriebouw Cycling Team	+ 16' 33"
6	Steffen De Schuyteneer (BEL)	Lotto–Intermarché	+ 19' 34"
7	Kay De Bruyckere (BEL)	Pauwels Sauzen–Altez Industriebouw Cycling Team	+ 19' 55"
8	Eñaut Urkaregi (ESP)	Lidl–Trek	+ 21' 38"
9	Storm Ingebrigtsen (NOR)	Uno-X Mobility	+ 26' 33"
10	Luca Giaimi (ITA)	UAE Team Emirates XRG	+ 27' 36"

=== Team classification ===
Final team classification (1–10)
Rank	Team	Time
1	(Belgium) Alpecin–Premier Tech	62h 11' 30"
2	(Kazakhstan) XDS Astana Team	+ 39"
3	(France) Unibet Rose Rockets	+ 50"
4	(France) Team TotalEnergies	+ 1' 23"
5	(Switzerland) Pinarello–Q36.5 Pro Cycling Team	+ 2' 18"
6	(Switzerland) NSN Cycling Team	+ 4' 36"
7	(Belgium) Soudal–Quick-Step	+ 6' 05"
8	(Spain) Movistar Team	+ 10' 31"
9	(Belgium) Team Flanders–Baloise	+ 10' 47"
10	(Belgium) Lotto–Intermarché	+ 11' 40"
