= 2023 Brabantse Pijl =

2023 UCI ProSeries
- Event poster with previous winners Demi Vollering and Magnus Sheffield

Race details
- Dates: 12 April 2023
- Stages: 1
- Distance: 205.1 km (127.4 mi)
- Winning time: 4h 51' 10"

Results
	Winner	Dorian Godon (FRA)	(AG2R Citroën Team)
	Second	Ben Healy (IRL)	(EF Education–EasyPost)
	Third	Benoît Cosnefroy (FRA)	(AG2R Citroën Team)

The 2023 Brabantse Pijl was the 63rd edition of the Brabantse Pijl cycle race and was held on 12 April 2023. The race covered 205.1 km (127.4 mi), starting in Leuven and finishing in Overijse.

== Teams ==
Eleven of the eighteen UCI WorldTeams and nine UCI ProTeams made up the twenty teams that participated in the race. Every team entered 7 riders except for Arkéa–Samsic, EF Education–EasyPost, Q36.5 Pro Cycling Team, Team Bahrain Victorious and Trek–Segafredo who started with only 6 riders and Cofidis who only started with 5.

UCI WorldTeams

- AG2R Citroën Team
- Alpecin–Deceuninck
- Arkéa–Samsic
- Cofidis
- EF Education–EasyPost
- Ineos Grenadiers
- Intermarché–Circus–Wanty
- Soudal–Quick-Step
- Team Bahrain Victorious
- Trek–Segafredo
- UAE Team Emirates

UCI ProTeams

- Bingoal WB
- Bolton Equities Black Spoke
- Human Powered Health
- Israel–Premier Tech
- Lotto–Dstny
- Q36.5 Pro Cycling Team
- Team Flanders–Baloise
- Tudor Pro Cycling Team
- Uno-X Pro Cycling Team

== Result ==
Result
Rank	Rider	Team	Time
1	Dorian Godon (FRA)	AG2R Citroën Team	4h 51' 10"
2	Ben Healy (IRL)	EF Education–EasyPost	+ 1"
3	Benoît Cosnefroy (FRA)	AG2R Citroën Team	+ 21"
4	Rémi Cavagna (FRA)	Soudal–Quick-Step	+ 24"
5	Axel Zingle (FRA)	Cofidis	+ 25"
6	Alexander Kamp (DEN)	Tudor Pro Cycling Team	+ 25"
7	Arnaud De Lie (BEL)	Lotto–Dstny	+ 25"
8	Andrea Bagioli (ITA)	Soudal–Quick-Step	+ 25"
9	Toms Skujiņš (LAT)	Trek–Segafredo	+ 25"
10	Kim Heiduk (GER)	Ineos Grenadiers	+ 25"
