= Emilien Jeannière =

French bicycle racer

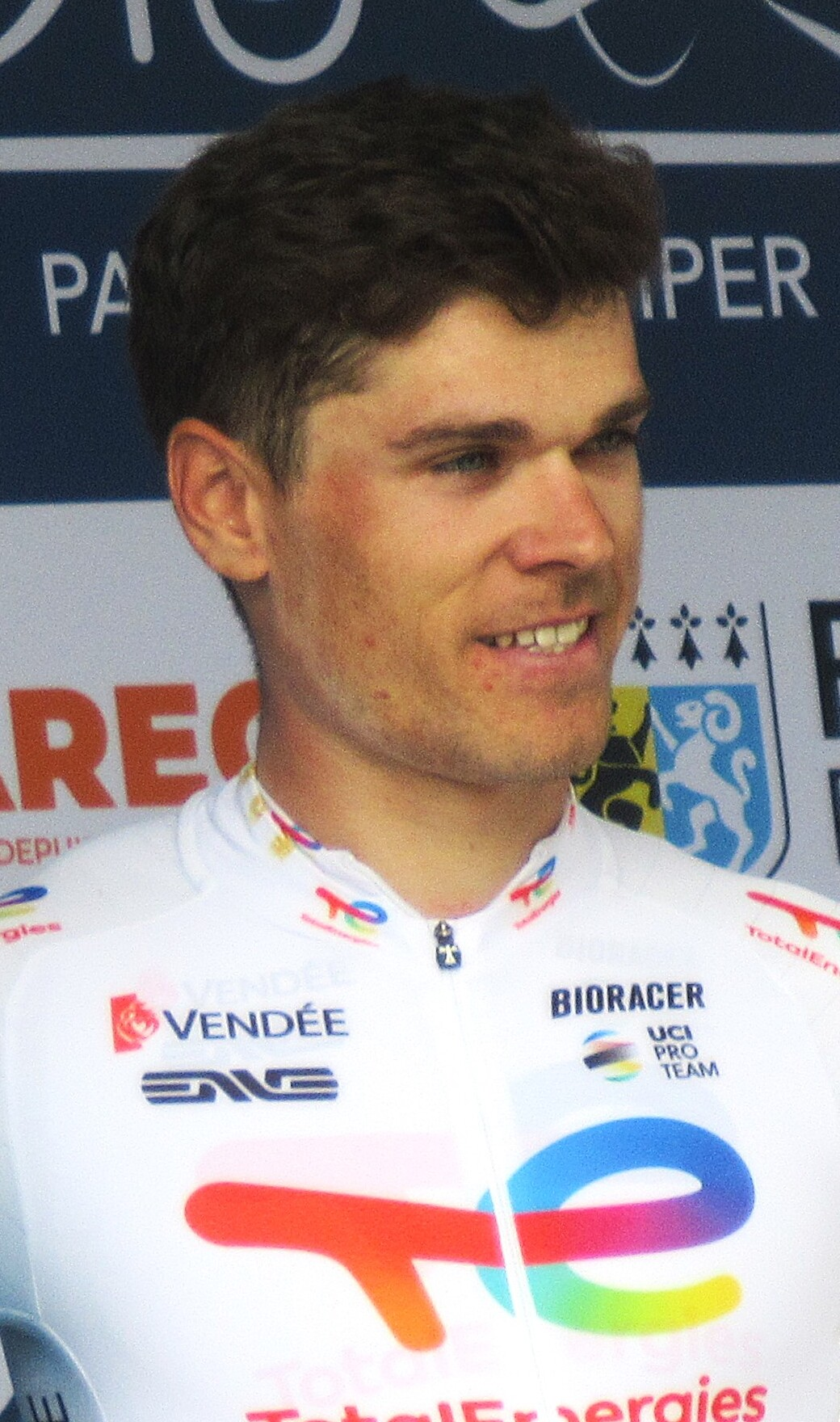
- Jeannière in 2025

Personal information
- Born: 26 September 1998 (age 28) Saint-Paul-en-Pareds, France
- Height: 1.76 m (5 ft 9 in)

Cycling career
- Sport: Cycling
- Current team: Team TotalEnergies
- Discipline: Road
- Role: Rider

Amateur teams
- 2006–2016: VC Herbretais
- 2017–2022: Vendée U

Professional teams
- 2021: Team TotalEnergies (stagiaire)
- 2023–: Team TotalEnergies

Emilien Jeannière (born 26 September 1998) is a French cyclist, who currently rides for UCI ProTeam Team TotalEnergies.

== Major results ==
2016
1st Stage 2 Tour du Valromey
2nd Road race, UEC European Junior Road Championships
3rd Chrono des Nations Juniors
5th Bernaudeau Junior
2017
1st Flèche de Locminé
2018
1st Jard-Les Herbiers
2020
1st Grand Prix d'Availles-Limouzine
2nd Road race, National Amateur Road Championships
2021
1st Flèche de Locminé
1st Stage 2 La SportBreizh
2022
1st Overall Tour du Loiret

1st Stage 2

Flèche du Sud

1st Points classification
1st Stage 2

1st Paris-Connerré
1st Circuit de la vallée de la Loire
1st Stages 1 (TTT) & 4 Tour Nivernais Morvan
1st Stage 3 Boucle de l'Artois
1st Stage 4 Tour de Moselle
3rd Overall Tour d'Eure-et-Loir

1st Stage 1

8th Overall Tour de Normandie
2024 (5 pro wins)
1st Overall Tour de Kyushu

1st Points classification
1st Stages 1 & 2

2nd Antwerp Port Epic
3rd Overall Tour of Istanbul

1st Points classification
1st Stage 1

4th Super 8 Classic
5th Overall Boucles de la Mayenne

1st Points classification
1st Stage 1

5th Circuit Franco-Belge
5th Grote Prijs Jean-Pierre Monseré
5th Famenne Ardenne Classic
5th Tour of Leuven
6th Kuurne–Brussels–Kuurne
7th Grand Prix de Fourmies
9th Classic Brugge–De Panne
2025
2nd Bretagne Classic
2nd Grand Prix de Wallonie
2nd Tour de Vendée
3rd Copenhagen Sprint
3rd Clásica de Almería
3rd Le Samyn
3rd Route Adélie de Vitré
3rd Tour du Finistère
6th Grand Prix du Morbihan
6th Polynormande
7th Paris–Chauny
8th Classique Dunkerque
2026
3rd Scheldeprijs
3rd Clàssica Comunitat Valenciana 1969
4th Nokere Koerse
8th Overall Tour of Belgium

=== Grand Tour general classification results timeline ===
Grand Tour	2025
Giro d'Italia	—
Tour de France	DNF
Vuelta a España	—

Legend
—	Did not compete
DNF	Did not finish
