= Valentin Retailleau =

French bicycle racer

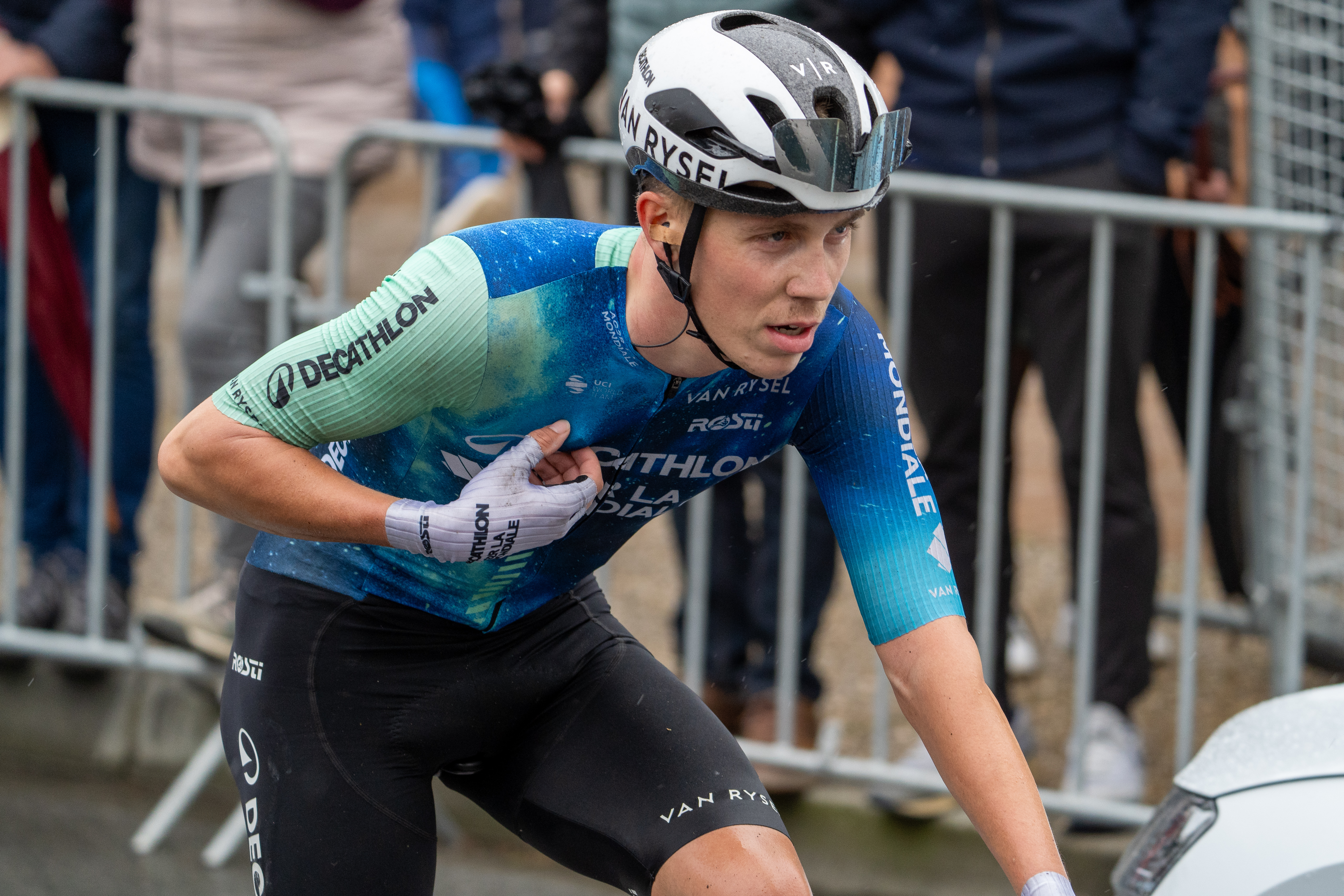
- Retailleau in 2024

Personal information
- Born: 18 June 2000 (age 26) Limoges, France
- Height: 1.81 m (5 ft 11 in)
- Weight: 64 kg (141 lb)

Cycling career
- Sport: Cycling
- Current team: Team TotalEnergies
- Discipline: Road
- Role: Rider

Amateur teams
- ?–2014: UV Limoges
- 2015–2018: UC Confolens
- 2019–2020: Chambéry CF
- 2021: AG2R Citroën U23 Team

Professional teams
- 2021: AG2R Citroën Team (stagiaire)
- 2022–2024: AG2R Citroën Team
- 2025–: Team TotalEnergies
Medal record
Men's road cycling
Representing France
Mediterranean Games
Bronze medal – third place	2022 Oran	Road race

Valentin Retailleau (born 18 June 2000) is a French cyclist, who currently rides for UCI ProTeam Team TotalEnergies.

== Major results ==
2017
2nd Grand Prix Bob Jungels
9th Overall Aubel–Thimister–La Gleize
9th Overall Sint-Martinusprijs Kontich
2018
1st Overall Tour de Gironde

1st Stage 2

1st Stage 3 Ronde des Vallées
1st Stage 2a (TTT) Aubel–Thimister–Stavelot
2nd Overall Driedaagse van Axel
5th Overall Grand Prix Rüebliland

1st Mountains classification
1st Stage 4

6th Overall Tour des Portes du Pays d'Othe

1st Stage 2 (TTT)

2021
1st Road race, National Under-23 Road Championships
3rd Overall Tour de Bretagne

1st Young rider classification
1st Stage 1

7th Trofeo Città di San Vendemiano
2022
1st Stage 4 Alpes Isère Tour
3rd Road race, Mediterranean Games
3rd Overall Tour du Loir-et-Cher

1st Young rider classification

3rd Kattekoers
2024
1st Stage 3 Boucles de la Mayenne
7th Classic Loire Atlantique
2025
10th Rund um Köln
