= Le Ham, Mayenne =

Le Ham
- Commune
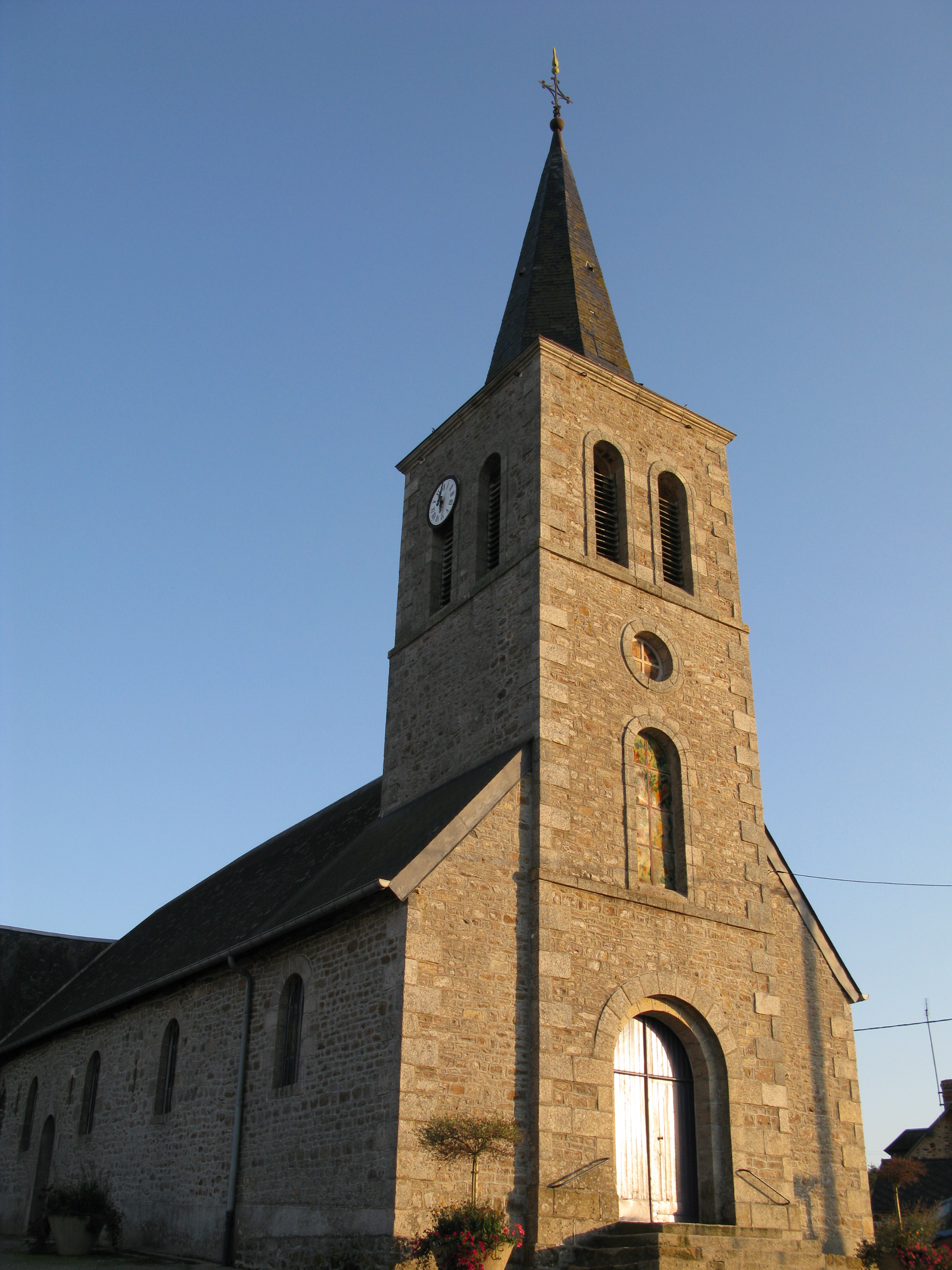
- The church in Le Ham
- Location of Le Ham
- Location within France Location within Pays de la Loire
- Coordinates: 48°22′51″N 0°22′36″W
- Country: France
- Region: Pays de la Loire
- Department: Mayenne
- Arrondissement: Mayenne
- Canton: Villaines-la-Juhel

Government
  - Mayor (2020–2026): Diane Rouland
- Area^{1}: 25.28 km^{2} (9.76 sq mi)
- Elevation: 205 m (673 ft)
- Highest elevation: 321 m (1,053 ft)
- Lowest elevation: 153 m (502 ft)
- Population (2023): 338
  - Density: 13.4/km^{2} (34.6/sq mi)
- Time zone: UTC+01:00 (CET)
  - Summer (DST): UTC+02:00 (CEST)
- INSEE/Postal code: 53112 /53250
- ^{1} French Land Register data, which excludes lakes, ponds, glaciers > 1 km^{2} (0.386 sq mi or 247 acres) and river estuaries.

Le Ham (French pronunciation: [lə am]) is a commune in the Mayenne department in north-western France.

== Geography ==
The commune is made up of the following collection of villages and hamlets, L'Étulerie, Villeray, La Grange, Le Ham, Goulifer, Les Marcillés, La Boucassière, Chérancé, La Terrière, Les Haies and Le Cruchet.

== See also ==
- Communes of the Mayenne department
