= Saint-Martin-de-Landelles =

- Part of Saint-Hilaire-du-Harcouët
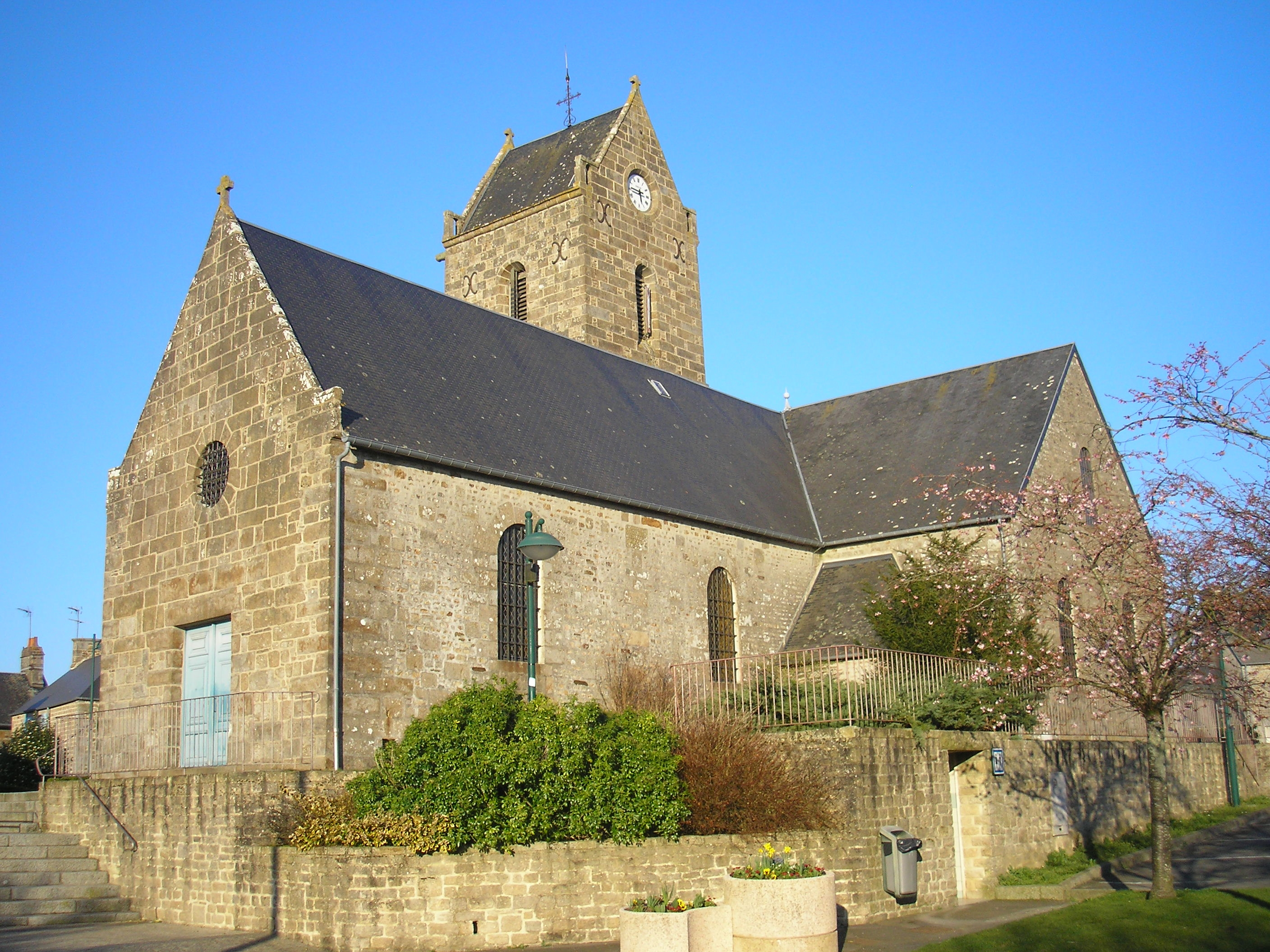
- The church of Saint-Martin
- Location of Saint-Martin-de-Landelles
- Location within France Location within Normandy
- Coordinates: 48°32′48″N 1°10′15″W
- Country: France
- Region: Normandy
- Department: Manche
- Arrondissement: Avranches
- Canton: Saint-Hilaire-du-Harcouët
- Commune: Saint-Hilaire-du-Harcouët
- Area^{1}: 19.91 km^{2} (7.69 sq mi)
- Elevation: 178 m (584 ft)
- Highest elevation: 192 m (630 ft)
- Lowest elevation: 57 m (187 ft)
- Population (2022): 1,096
  - Density: 55.05/km^{2} (142.6/sq mi)
- Time zone: UTC+01:00 (CET)
  - Summer (DST): UTC+02:00 (CEST)
- Postal code: 50730
- ^{1} French Land Register data, which excludes lakes, ponds, glaciers > 1 km^{2} (0.386 sq mi or 247 acres) and river estuaries.

Saint-Martin-de-Landelles (French pronunciation: [sɛ̃ maʁtɛ̃ də lɑ̃dɛl]) is a former commune in the Manche department in Normandy in north-western France. On 1 January 2016, it was merged into the commune of Saint-Hilaire-du-Harcouët. Its population was 1,096 in 2022.

== See also ==
- Communes of the Manche department
