= 2019 Tour of Flanders =

2019 UCI World Tour, race 14 of 38
- Event poster with previous winner Niki Terpstra

Race details
- Dates: 7 April 2019
- Stages: 1
- Distance: 267 km (166 mi)
- Winning time: 6h 18' 49"

Results
	Winner	Alberto Bettiol (ITA)	(EF Education First)
	Second	Kasper Asgreen (DEN)	(Deceuninck–Quick-Step)
	Third	Alexander Kristoff (NOR)	(UAE Team Emirates)

The 103rd edition of the Tour of Flanders (Dutch: Ronde van Vlaanderen) was held on 7 April 2019 in Belgium. It was the 14th event of the 2019 UCI World Tour and the second monument classic of the season, following Milan–San Remo. The race was won by Italian rider Alberto Bettiol (EF Education First Pro Cycling).

The race started in Antwerp and finished in Oudenaarde, covering 267 kilometres (166 mi). It featured 17 categorized climbs and five flat sectors of cobbled roads. Dutch rider Niki Terpstra won the previous edition in 2018.

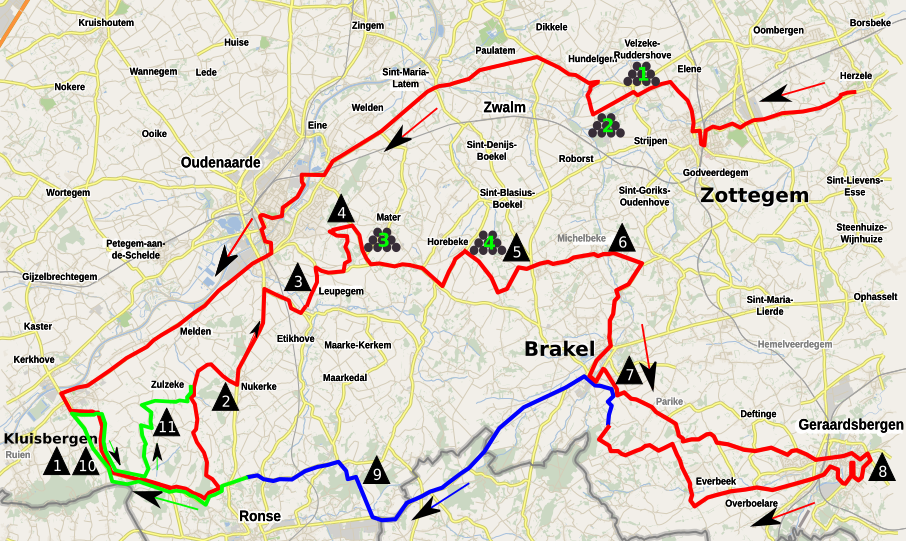
Final 170 kilometres (110 mi) of the 103rd Tour of Flanders

Terpstra crashed out this year in a multiple bike pile-up early in the race. He appeared to be unconscious for more than a minute, was ultimately taken to hospital and forced to abandon the race.

== Teams ==
As the Tour of Flanders was a UCI World Tour event, all eighteen UCI WorldTeams were invited automatically and obliged to enter a team in the race. Seven UCI Professional Continental teams competed, completing the 25-team peloton.

UCI WorldTeams

- AG2R La Mondiale
- Astana
- Bahrain–Merida
- Bora–Hansgrohe
- CCC Team
- Deceuninck–Quick-Step
- EF Education First
- Groupama–FDJ
- Lotto–Soudal
- Mitchelton–Scott
- Movistar Team
- Team Dimension Data
- Team Jumbo–Visma
- Team Katusha–Alpecin
- Team Sunweb
- Trek–Segafredo
- UAE Team Emirates
- Team Sky

UCI Professional Continental teams

- Cofidis
- Corendon–Circus
- Roompot–Charles
- Sport Vlaanderen–Baloise
- Vital Concept–B&B Hotels
- Wanty–Gobert
- Direct Énergie

== Results ==
Result
Rank	Rider	Team	Time
1	Alberto Bettiol (ITA)	EF Education First	6h 18' 49"
2	Kasper Asgreen (DEN)	Deceuninck–Quick-Step	+ 14"
3	Alexander Kristoff (NOR)	UAE Team Emirates	+ 17"
4	Mathieu van der Poel (NED)	Corendon–Circus	+ 17"
5	Nils Politt (GER)	Team Katusha–Alpecin	+ 17"
6	Michael Matthews (AUS)	Team Sunweb	+ 17"
7	Oliver Naesen (BEL)	AG2R La Mondiale	+ 17"
8	Alejandro Valverde (ESP)	Movistar Team	+ 17"
9	Tiesj Benoot (BEL)	Lotto–Soudal	+ 17"
10	Greg Van Avermaet (BEL)	CCC Team	+ 17"
