= Nolann Mahoudo =

French cyclist

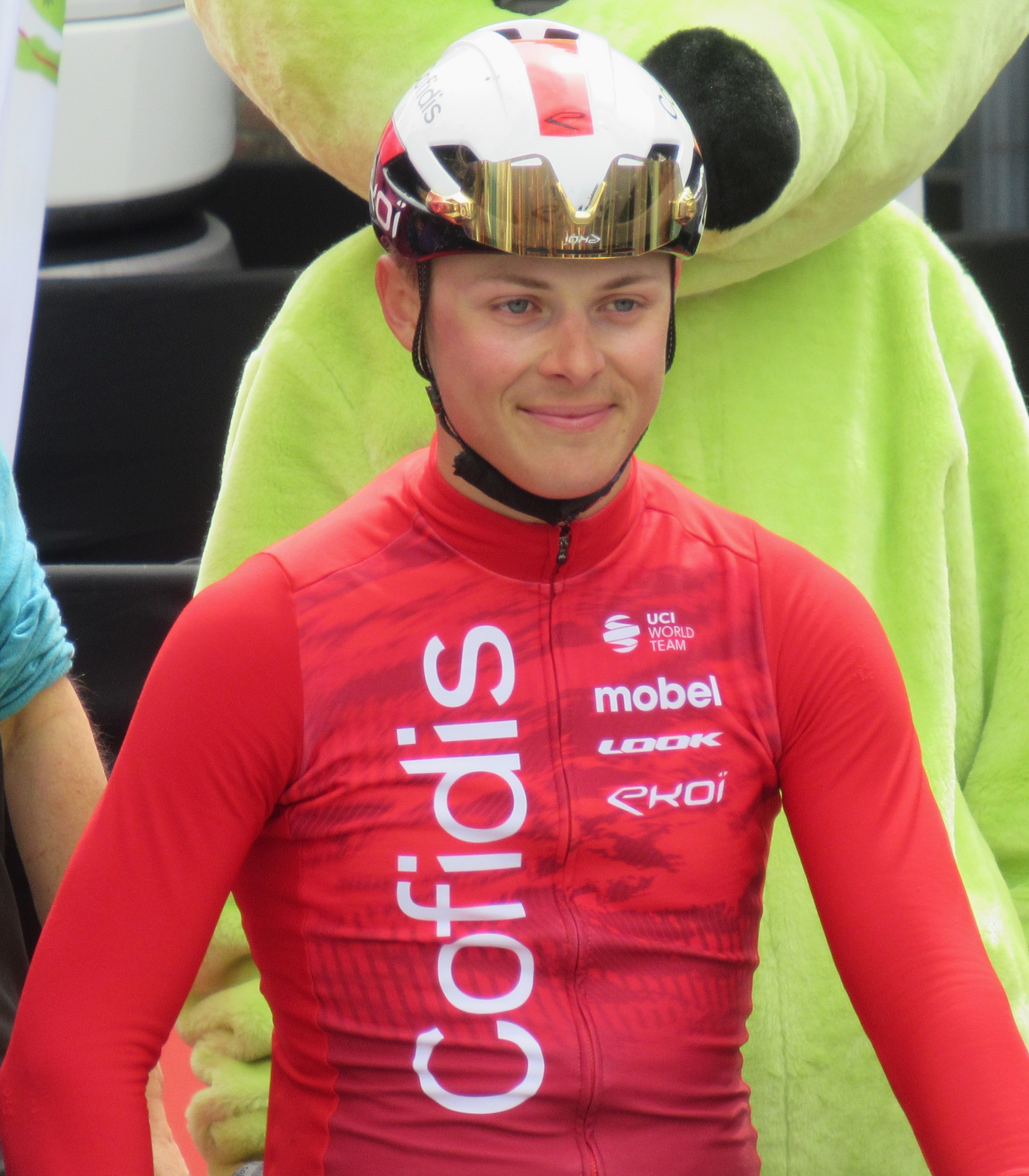

Personal information
- Born: 17 November 2001 (age 24) Loudéac, France
- Height: 1.71 m (5 ft 7 in)
- Weight: 61 kg (134 lb)

Cycling career
- Sport: Cycling
- Current team: Cofidis
- Disciplines: Road; Cyclo-cross
- Role: Rider

Amateur teams
- 2019–2020: VC Pays de Loudéac U19
- 2021–2022: VC Pays de Loudéac

Professional teams
- 2022: B&B Hotels–KTM (stagiaire)
- 2023: CIC U Nantes Atlantique
- 2024–: Cofidis

Nolann Mahoudo (born 17 November 2002) is a French cyclist, who currently rides for UCI WorldTeam Cofidis.

== Major results ==
2023
2nd Overall Tour de Bretagne

1st Young rider classification
1st Stage 4

2024
8th Tour du Finistère
