= Wahoo Fitness =

American fitness technology company

Wahoo Fitness, LLC
- Type: Private company
- Industry: Technology
- Founded: Atlanta, U.S. (2009)
- Founder: Chip Hawkins
- Headquarters: Atlanta, United States
- Area served: Worldwide
- Products: Bicycle trainer, Heart rate monitor, Cycling computer, Cycling sensor
- Number of employees: 200-300 (2021)
- Website: https://www.wahoofitness.com

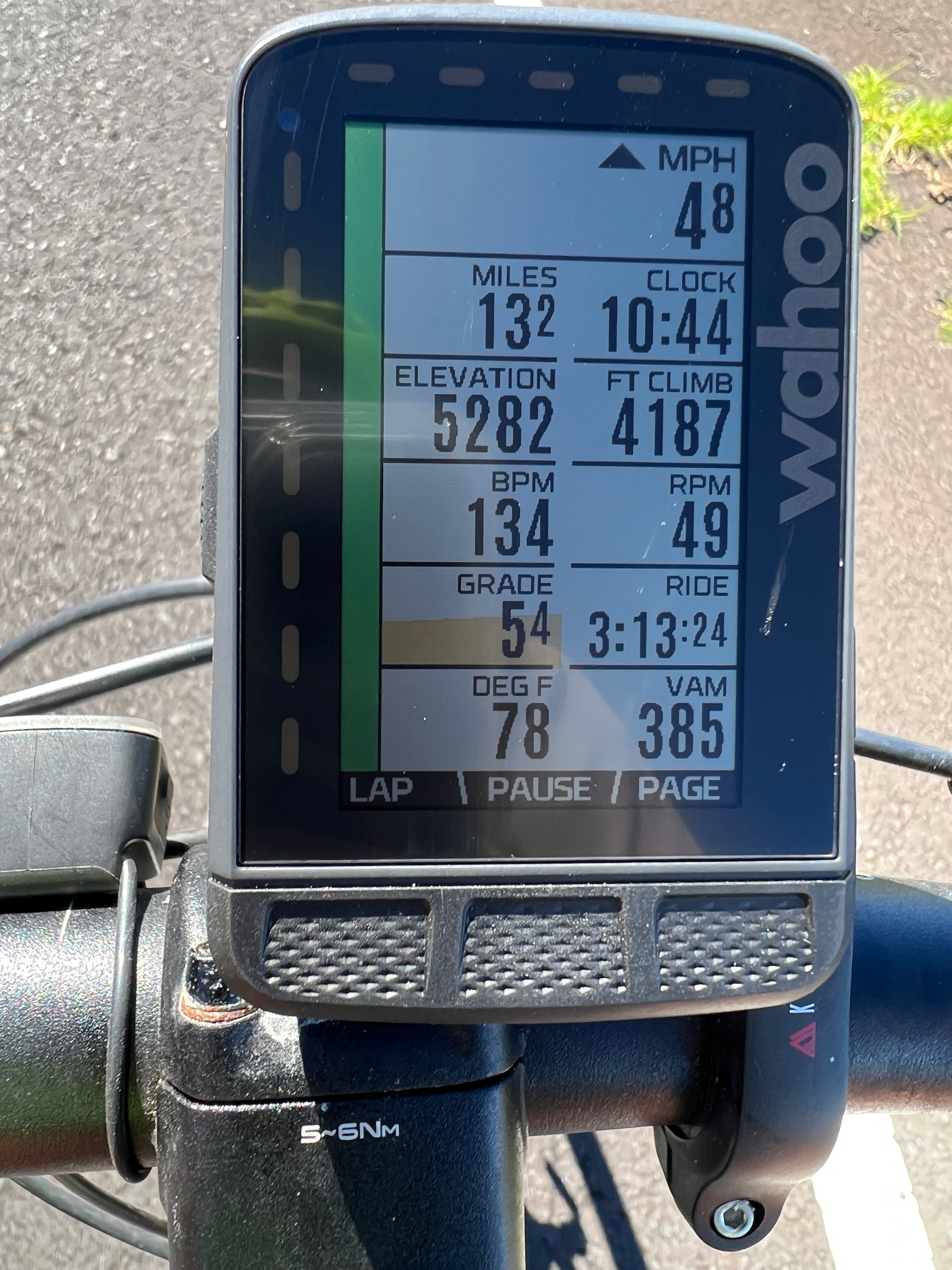
Wahoo ELEMNT cyclocomputer

Wahoo Fitness is a fitness technology company based in Atlanta. Its CEO is Gareth Joyce. Founded in 2009 by Chip Hawkins, Wahoo Fitness has offices in London, Berlin, Tokyo, Boulder and Brisbane.

Wahoo's portfolio of cycling industry products includes the KICKR family of Indoor Cycling Trainers and Accessories, the ELEMNT family of GPS Cycling Computers and sport watches, the TICKR family of Heart Rate Monitors, SPEEDPLAY Advanced Road Pedal systems and the Wahoo SYSTM Training App.

== History ==
Wahoo was founded by Chip Hawkins in 2009 and specializes in manufacturing bike gear. Ant+ key was the company’s first product, a small device riders can attach to their bike that enables them to share, measure, and track training data from fitness sensors.

In June 2021, Rhone Equity purchased a majority ownership stake in the company, which was later bought back by Hawkins and a group of investment partners in 2023.

In 2022, Wahoo accused Zwift of infringing on its copyright when the latter launched the Hub bike trainer. The trainer was manufactured by Jet Black. Wahoo filed a patent infringement lawsuit against both. Wahoo and JetBlack settled in December 2022, and after a year-long battle in court, Wahoo and Zwift announced in September 2023 that they had reached an amicable agreement.

The company released its first treadmill, the Kickr Run smart treadmill, in the United States in 2024.

== Acquisitions ==
Pedal manufacturer, Speedplay, was acquired by Wahoo in September 2019. Indoor training platforms, The Sufferfest, later rebranded to Wahoo SYSTM, was acquired in July 2020, and RGT (Road Grand Tour), later rebranded to Wahoo RGT, was purchased in April 2022.

== Funding and investment ==
- 2010 – Private Investment
- July 2018 – Norwest Equity Partners
- Q3 2021 – Rhône Group
- May 17, 2023 – Wahoo announces Wahoo Fitness Founder Buys Company Back from Banks

== Team sponsorship ==
Wahoo is an official sponsor for:

Women's cycling teams

- EF Education–Tibco–SVB
- Le Col–Wahoo
- Team DSM
- Trek–Segafredo
- Ceratizit-WNT
- Arkéa
- Bingoal Casino-Chevalmeire
- Rally Cycling
- Twenty24

Men's cycling teams

- EF Education–EasyPost
- Bora-Hansgrohe
- Alpecin–Fenix
- Hagens Berman Axeon
- Deceuninck–Quick-Step
- AG2R Citroën
- Team DSM
- Trek–Segafredo
- Cofidis
- Arkéa–Samsic
- Novo Nordisk
- Rally Cycling
- WiV SunGod
- Maloja Pushbikers
- Ribble Weldtite
- P&S Metalltechnik
- Trinity Racing
- Tirol KTM

== See also ==
- MyWhoosh
- Rouvy
- Zwift
- Kinomap
