= Spinning (cycling) =

US brand of indoor bicycles

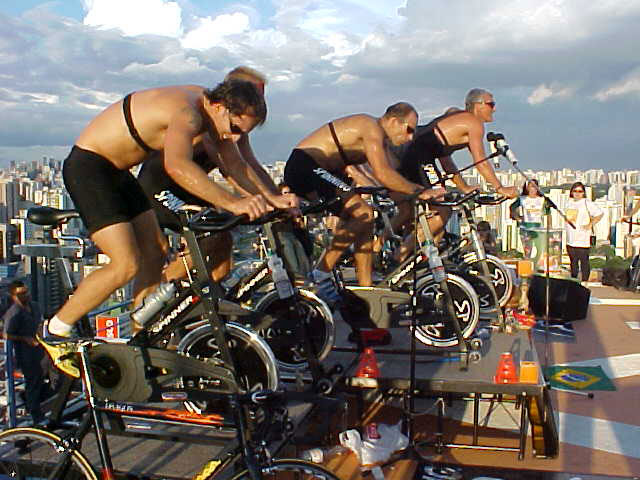
- Product type: indoor cycling instruction & exercise equipment
- Current owner: Mad Dogg Athletics
- Country: U.S.
- Introduced: 1993
- Markets: Worldwide
- Ambassador: John Baudhuin
- Website: spinning.com

Spinning is a brand of indoor bicycles and indoor cycling instruction classes distributed and licensed by the American health and fitness company Mad Dogg Athletics. Launched in 1993, the brand has become a popular term for indoor bicycles and indoor cycling fitness classes in the United States and worldwide.

There are ongoing disputes to whether Spinning has become a generic term for indoor cycling equipment and Mad Dogg's trademark should be removed.

== History ==
The Spinning indoor cycling program was developed by South African endurance bicycle racer Jonathan Goldberg, in 1987. Early prototypes were targeted towards endurance athletes as a substitute for outdoor bicycle training.

The Johnny G Spinning Center was first opened in 1989, in Santa Monica, California. Later it was moved to Karen Voight Fitness in 1992 . In 1993, Goldberg and his business partner John Baudhuin launched the Spinning indoor cycling fitness program in Santa Monica, California. The first Spinning brand indoor cycling programs were held in Crunch gyms in New York.

In 1995, Spinning bikes would debut at a trade show as part of a deal Goldberg and Baudhuin made with the Schwinn Bicycle Company. In 1996, there were more than a thousand Official Spinning Facilities spanning over 30 countries.

In 2003, Star Trac replaced Schwinn as the bike manufacturer for Spinning. Goldberg retired from the company in 2004. In 2015, Mad Dogg Athletics partnered with Precor to create a new line of commercial Spinning bikes.

== Possible generic term ==
Spinning has become a generic term in the United States, and a generic term can not function as a trademark. However, Mad Dogg Athletics has registered Spinning as a trademark on the Principal Register of the United States Patent and Trademark Office. A registration on the Principal Register does not create ownership rights under the laws of the United States, and a registration may be challenged and removed if the challenger proves as a matter of fact that the alleged trademark has become generic.

Mad Dogg Athletics continues to defend the Spinning trademark against its generic use and has recently expanded its focus and efforts on brand protection.

Based on the brand's widespread popularity, it has potentially become a generic term for indoor cycling in the Czech Republic. However, in November 2018, the General Court (European Union) upheld Mad Dogg's rights and found that the brand was not a generic term.

In February 2021, popular indoor cycling brand Peloton appealed to have the 20-year old trademark canceled, clamining the term Spinning had become a generic term. Just days before the trial, Peloton dropped its lawsuit for the removal of the 'spinning' trademark.

== Related products ==
To protect its trademark for the term Spinning, Mad Dogg Athletics commonly refers to its products and services as the "SPINNING brand", "SPINNING indoor cycling", "SPINNING certification", and similar terms, not just "Spinning".

== See also ==
- CrossFit, is a comparable American brand and potentially genericized trademark.
- Indoor Cycling, for information about the generic sport of spinning.
