= Mad Dogg Athletics =

American exercise equipment company

- Company type: Inc
- Industry: Bicycles, men’s and women’s apparel, shoes, accessories, music, videos, heart rate monitors, and functional training equipment
- Founded: 1994; 32 years ago
- Founder: Johnny G and John Baudhuin
- Headquarters: Venice, California, USA
- Website: maddogg.com

Mad Dogg Athletics, Inc. markets bicycles, men’s and women’s apparel, shoes, accessories, music, videos, heart rate monitors, and functional training equipment online. It also provides training services.

== History ==
Mad Dogg Athletics is based in Venice, California and was founded by Johnny G and John Baudhuin in 1994.

The company filed for a Chapter 11 petition in 2019.

== Trademarks ==
Mad Dogg Athletics owns the trademarks "Spin", "Spinner", and "Spinning" for spinning (exercise) programs and exercise equipment. Mad Dogg Athletics also worked closely with Star Trac, which was the licensed distributor of its commercial line of Spinner stationary bicycles. They have now partnered with Precor to manufacture their line of commercial Spinner bikes.

On 21 Jul 2014, OHIM’s Cancellation Division issued its decision on an application by Czech company Aerospinning Master Franchising Ltd., s.r.o. to revoke a Community trade mark "SPINNING": The CTM proprietor's rights in respect of Community trademark No 175 117 are revoked in their entirety as from 07/02/2012.

In June 2010, Batavus recognized Mad Dogg's trademarks, reaching a settlement and agreeing to discontinue use of the Spinning trademarks in relation to the manufacture of Batavus's indoor cycling bikes.

The trademark "Spinning & Fitness" was officially cancelled on February 11, 2014 after the Czech company Aerospinning Master Franchising Ltd. filed petition for cancellation with the Czech trademark office.

Mad Dogg Athletics has enforced their trademarks despite doubts about validity of their word trademark "spinning". In Mad Dogg Athletics, Inc. versus Batavus B.V. ruling the court agrees with Batavus, a Dutch bicycle manufacturer: Mad Dogg’s trademarks have become generic.
