= Gamebike =

Interactive exercise machine

A gamebike is an interactive fitness bike that requires the user to exercise in order to play their video games. The user must pedal the bike in order for the character to accelerate and must turn the handlebars to steer. The game bike allows users to control the character in their game while getting exercise.

== History ==
Game Bike is the name of an interactive fitness device first invented and patented by Edward H. (Ted) Parks, M.D. in 2000. Dr. Parks sold the rights to his patent to Cateye Co Ltd, a Japanese company with expertise in electronic bicycle accessories, such as bike lights and speedometers. Cateye's initial embodiment of Parks' design used a traditional bicycle attached to what they referred to as their GB100 system. The front tire was placed into a turn style platform that was used to read direction. Sensors were placed of the rear wheel which was mounted in a bicycle trainer to measure the speed. Cateye Co Ltd. first started production of the Game Bike in the GB100 form.

The project was then handled by a group in New Jersey that redesigned the product to be a single package incorporated into a stand-alone indoor exercise bike. The GB200 was born. An immediate need for a commercial version was soon covered by the introduction of the popular GB-300 Game Bike.

Late in 2008, Cateye Co Ltd. stopped all international distribution of the fitness line. Game Bike Production was then done by Source Distributors Inc. out of Dallas, Texas. Source Distributors produced the bike and made modifications to the unit to improve the controller serviceability. The Game Bike is a popular product within the school and YMCA markets. Thousands of bikes were sold in since the start of 2003.

Game Bike is now owned by Hudson Fitness LLC. Game Bike is currently available and Hudson Fitness LLC continues supporting the Game Bike service.

== Compatible titles ==
Compatible titles include: Any speed-based video game for PS2/PS3/Game Cube/Xbox
