= Pale Fire Capital =

Czech investment group

Pale Fire Capital SE
- Type: Private
- Industry: Investment management
- Founded: 2015
- Founders: Jan Barta; Dušan Šenkypl; David Holý; Petr Krajíček
- Headquarters: Prague, Czech Republic
- Revenue: 4,883,375,000 Czech koruna (2024)
- Operating income: 525,200,000 Czech koruna (2024)
- Net income: 414,222,000 Czech koruna (2024)
- Total assets: 6,108,983,000 Czech koruna (2024)
- Number of employees: 182 (2024)
- Website: palefirecapital.com

Pale Fire Capital (PFC) is a Czech investment group based in Prague. Founded in 2015, the group combines private equity investments, in which it often takes an active role in portfolio companies, with investments in publicly traded companies.

The group's principal figures have included investors Jan Barta, Dušan Šenkypl and David Holý. In 2026, Jan Černý joined PFC as a partner and significant shareholder to develop its private equity activities. The parent company, Pale Fire Capital SE, is a Societas Europaea registered in Prague.

== History ==
Pale Fire Capital was established in 2015. Barta and Šenkypl had previously been involved in building the Czech online insurance comparison business ePojisteni.cz, which they later sold. By June 2021, PFC's portfolio comprised roughly two dozen companies and was valued at more than CZK 3 billion. Its investments at the time included the online marketplace Aukro and furniture search platform Favi.

In 2021, PFC raised external financing for the first time through a bond issue by its subsidiary. The issue was initially planned at CZK 500 million, with an option to increase it to CZK 750 million. Strong investor demand led the company to exercise the option, and the full CZK 750 million was subscribed

During the following years, PFC expanded from primarily technology-oriented private equity into a broader investment group combining private-company investments with public-market strategies. By the end of 2025, its private-equity portfolio was valued at approximately CZK 10 billion. In 2026, Jan Černý joined PFC as a partner and significant shareholder to develop its private-equity activities.

== Investment activities ==
PFC operates both a private-equity business and a public-markets investment business. Its private equity strategy has generally involved acquiring substantial stakes in companies and becoming involved in their strategic development. The public markets arm includes the Growth sub-fund, which invests primarily in listed securities and may use leverage, derivatives and short positions.

At the end of 2025, an investment company within the PFC group had approximately CZK 65.9 billion invested in shares and other exchange-traded instruments. The reported figure included leverage through margin financing and short positions and therefore did not represent the fund's net asset value.

=== Groupon ===
One of PFC's most prominent investments has been the American online marketplace Groupon. PFC built a large shareholding in the company and became its largest shareholder.

PFC partner Dušan Šenkypl joined Groupon's board in 2022 and was appointed interim chief executive officer in March 2023. He was named permanent CEO in May 2024. Under the PFC-backed management, Groupon underwent a restructuring that included cost reductions and a greater focus on local services and experiences rather than lower-margin merchandise sales.

=== Rouvy and Zwift ===
PFC acquired a majority stake in the Czech indoor-cycling platform Rouvy in 2021. In April 2026, American fitness technology company Zwift acquired Rouvy. PFC, which had been Rouvy's majority owner, received a significant shareholding in Zwift as part of the transaction; the value of the deal was not disclosed.

=== Public-market investments ===
PFC has also built substantial holdings in publicly traded companies. In March 2026, it began investing in online education company Coursera, alongside positions in companies including Phreesia, Angi and Ziff Davis. PFC also acquired positions in Commerce.com (8.7 % as of September 2026), Cars.com (7.5 % as of September 2026), Lightspeed Commerce (5.1 % as of September 2026) or B2Gold (3.4 % as of September 2026).

By November 2026, PFC had increased its position in Coursera to approximately 14.67 %, making it the company's largest shareholder. Coursera subsequently adopted a shareholder rights plan with a 15 % ownership threshold. By April 2026, PFC had increased its position in Phreesia to approximately 14.7 %.
