= Dance Academy (disambiguation) =

Dance Academy is an Australian teen-oriented television drama.

Dance Academy may also refer to:

- Beijing Dance Academy, an institution of higher education in dance in Beijing, China
- Dance Academy, Plymouth, a club formerly based at the New Palace Theatre, Plymouth, England, UK
- Philadelphia Dance Academy, now part of the University of the Arts, Philadelphia, U.S.
- Roland Dupree Dance Academy, a dance centre formerly based in Hollywood, California, U.S.
- Rotterdam Dance Academy, now part of Codarts University for the Arts, Rotterdam, Netherlands
- Shanghai Dance Academy, now the Shanghai Ballet Company, China
