= Roland Dupree =

American actor (1925–2015)

Roland Dupree (born Roland Furtado, September 20, 1925 - June 21, 2015) was an American actor, dancer, and choreographer. He is best known for founding the Roland Dupree Dance Academy and his work as the action model for Walt Disney's Peter Pan.

== Early life ==
Roland Dupree was born on September 20, 1925, in Fall River, Massachusetts, to Antone Furtado of Portuguese descent and Theresa Dupuis, of French Canadian descent. Dupree's first language was actually French but he learned English and ultimately became the family's breadwinner due to his all-American talent at a young age. He began his performing career as a tap dancer at ten years old in his hometown. His award-winning performances caused him to gain popularity on the local stages of Massachusetts. At the age eleven he was hired to perform four shows each weekend at a nightclub in Providence, Rhode Island, called Carry's Cafe. He was paid $5 each performance, ultimately gaining a whopping $20 a weekend. After working at the nightclub for six months, Roland and his parents left Fall River and moved to Hollywood, California. There, a twelve year old Dupree enrolled in Meglin's Dance School, which at the time was known for sending their top students to motion picture studios for movie and stage auditions. Sooner than expected, Roland was sent to the studios of Columbia Pictures. He booked the job with a twelve-year-old girl in a dance sequence, landing his first movie role in You Can't Take It With You. It was around this time that he created the stage name, Roland Dupree, his last name sounding like his mother's maiden name. This led to countless other auditions and jobs as a child performer.

== Career ==
=== Film ===
A year after his film debut, he appeared as Frenchy in The Star Maker starring Bing Crosby. In 1941, Roland's career truly began to thrive when Universal Studios developed a tap-dancing group called the "Jivin' Jacks and Jills". It was a cattle-call audition with countless other young dancers, but only fourteen were cast, including Dupree. Others in the group included Joyce Horne, Tommy Rall, Jimmy Vecchio, Robert Scheerer, Jane Adams, Kathleen Hughes, Susanna Foster, Peggy Moran, Mary Ellen Kay, Kristine Miller, Mala Powers, and Donna Martell. The group appeared in several films throughout the 1940s such as Give Out, Sisters and many other films featuring Peggy Ryan, The Andrews Sisters, and Donald O'Connor. After being in nearly ten films as a dancer and vocalist, Dupree decided to give acting a go and, after many auditions, he was cast as Shirley Temple's boyfriend, Joey, in Miss Annie Rooney. This eventually led to a contract at Metro-Goldwyn-Mayer Studios where, after being cast in many minor parts, he was given the role of Jerry, Ann Southern's love-sick bellhop in the film Maisie Goes To Reno. Although he was successful in his acting career, he made his last on-screen appearance in the 1949 film Joe Palooka in the Counterpunch in which he played the role of a bellboy.

=== Film Choreography ===
From there, he quickly moved into choreography when a top dance director was looking for an assistant for films. After applying and receiving the position, Roland was fascinated by the contrast between choreography for films versus the stage. His learning experience led him to work for many other dance directors. However, as film studios made fewer and fewer movie-musicals, Roland's employment options became scarce.

=== Peter Pan ===
One of Dupree's jazz students, Margaret Kerry, became the reference model for Tinker Bell for Walt Disney's Peter Pan. Before the computer age, all animated full-length films at the time were filmed with live actors to use as reference for the artists to make the characters more realistic. The studio asked her if she knew a dancer who could be the live action model for Peter Pan. She immediately thought of Dupree. After an interview and audition, Dupree got the role. Although Bobby Driscoll was the voice, Dupree was the model for Peter's stunt scenes. Driscoll was used a model for gestures and other acting that didn't involve the intensity that Dupree's job did.

=== Choreography ===
Once Roland's employment options were quite limited, he decided to create his own job by hiring two female dancers and choreographing a dance act called "The Dupree Trio". The threesome was featured in nightclubs throughout the United States, including Las Vegas, and were even seen on television. After a few years of working with the group Roland decided to put all of his focus into his choreography. During his time choreographing the trio, he developed a jazz style which would later be referred to as "West Coast Jazz".

== Retirement and death ==
After working for nearly 75 years and after years of semi-retirement, he formally retired in 2010. During his retirement, he lived in Kona, Hawaii, and later moved back to Albuquerque, New Mexico where he resided until his death in 2015. Dupree died on June 21, 2015, in Albuquerque due to natural causes after an illness.
