= Speedplay (bicycle pedal) =

Brand of clipless bicycle pedal

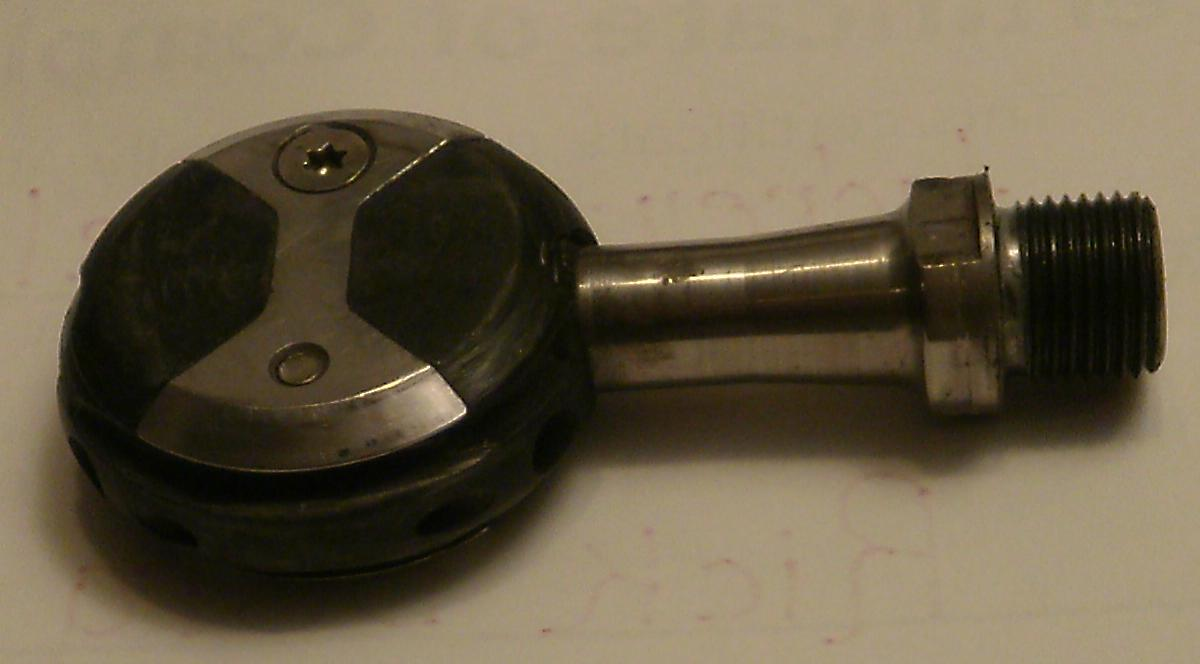
Speedplay X pedal

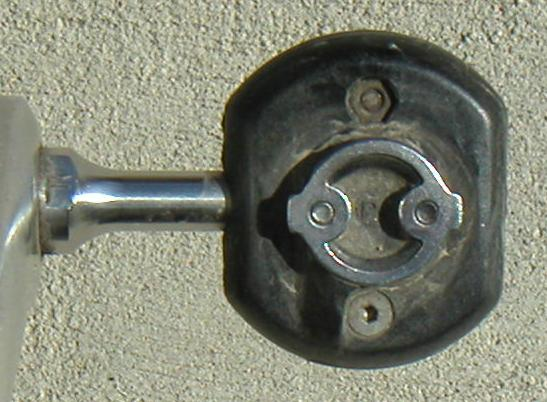
Speedplay Frog pedal

Speedplay (stylized as SPEEDPLAY) is a brand of clipless road cycling pedals owned by Wahoo Fitness. Wahoo Fitness re-engineered the lollipop pedals for increased durability and easier setup and maintenance. The pedal features dual-sided entry, 0-15 degrees of free float and 3-axis adjustability, which contributes to enhanced comfort and performance.

Speedplay pedals are used by many professional racers and triathletes, such as Jan Frodeno, Fabian Cancellara, Lucy Charles-Barclay, Daniela Ryf and by american professional cycling team EF Education–EasyPost.

== History ==
The first Speedplay pedal, the X, was patented in July 1989 by Richard Byrne. The company was founded in July, 1991, in San Diego, California. In September, 2019 Wahoo Fitness announced the acquisition of Speedplay.

== Technology ==
Speedplay Advanced Road Pedal System is characterized by double-sided entry, rotational free float and 3-axis adjustability to allow a rider to step on either side to engage the cleat, and keep the foot free to rotate from side to side about the center of the pedal. The float and micro-adjustability is reported to be easier on the knee joints to increase comfort and optimize fit on the bike.

In March, 2021 Wahoo Fitness launched a redesigned Speedplay pedal range, which sealed the bearings to streamline setup and maintenance of the pedals. Simultaneously, Wahoo Fitness announced the POWRLINK ZERO power meter pedal set to be released in summer 2021.
