= Rebecca Rimmington =

English sportswoman

Rebecca Elizabeth Rimmington
Personal information
- Full name: Rebecca Elizabeth Rimmington
- Nickname: Bex
- Born: 14 January 1983 (age 43) Grantham United Kingdom
- Height: 1.77 m (5 ft 9 1/2 in)

Cycling career
- Sport: Cycling

Professional team
- 2017: Team WNT Pro Cycling

Major wins
- Bronze, 2014 National 10-mile Time Trial Bronze, 2014 National Circuit Time Trial Gold, 2013 National Team Time Trial 2010 British Paracycling Road Race Championships☺ 2010 World Road Paracyling Ranked No. 1 Bronze, 2009 World☺Paracyling Road Race Championships

Rebecca Rimmington (born 14 January 1983 in Grantham, England) is an English sportsperson, a competitive cyclist and former tandem pilot for blind and visually impaired riders.

== Early life ==
Beckie Rimmington attended the National School, and briefly at KGGS. At Melton she attended John Ferneley College and Melton Upper School, gaining nine GCSEs.

== Career ==
At the 2009 UCI World Para-cycling Road Cup in Bogogno, Italy, Rimmington piloted Lora Turnham to a bronze medal in the Tandem Road Race.

As of 2018, Rimmington is a member of the Zwift Academy triathlon team and is set to compete in the 2018 Ironman World Championships in Hawaiʻi.

== Clubs and sponsors ==
2018 Zwift Academy
2016–2017 Team WNT Pro Cycling
2015 Ikon–Mazda
2014 Merlin Cycles
2013–2014 Trainsharp Race Team
2009–2010 Melton Olympic
2007–2009 VC St Raphael
2006–2007 Melton Olympic

== Major results ==
=== World Paracycling Championships ===
2007 – 4th, Paracycling World Championships Road Race - Tandem with Melanie Easter
2007 – 4th, Paracycling World Championships Time Trial - Tandem with Melanie Easter
2007 – 4th, Paracycling World Championships 3km Pursuit - Tandem with Melanie Easter
2007 - 10th Paracycling World Championships Kilo - Tandem with Melanie Easter
2009 – Bronze, 3rd, Paracycling World Championships Road Race - Tandem with Lora Turnham
2010 - British Paracycling Road Race Champion - Tandem with Lora Turnham
2010 - World Paracycling Road Ranking Number 1

=== Paracycling World Cup ===
2010 – Gold, Gold, Paracycling World Cup Road Race, Segovia - Tandem with Lora Turnham
2010 - Silver, Silver, Paracycling World Cup Time Trial, Segovia - Tandem with Lora Turnham

=== Paracycling Europa-Cup ===
2007 – Bronze, Bronze, Paracycling Europa-Cup Gippengen - Tandem with Melanie Easter
2009 – Silver, Silver, Paracycling Europa-Cup Piacenza Stage Race- Tandem with Lora Turnham
2010 – Gold, Gold, Paracycling Europa-Cup Bayonne Stage Race - Tandem with Lora Turnham
2010 - Gold, Gold, Paracycling Europa-Cup Bilbao Stage Race - Tandem with Lora Turnham
