= Johnny G =

South African bicycle racer (born 1956)

Jonathan Goldberg (born 1956 in Johannesburg, South Africa), known as Johnny G, is a South African cyclist, and developer of the indoor cycling program called Spinning.

== Spinning ==
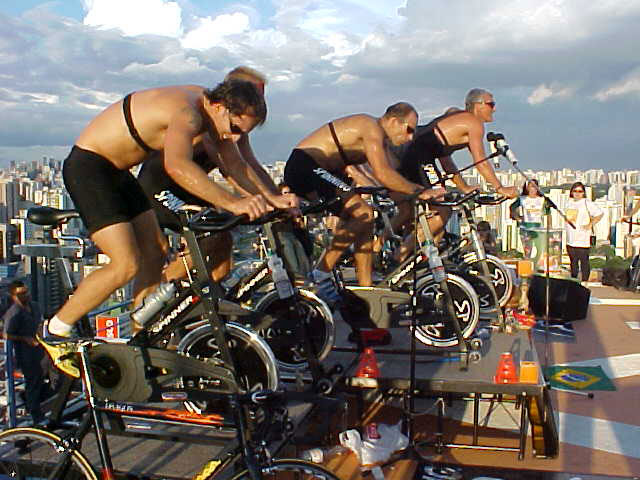
Spinning

Johnny G developed the Spinning program in 1987. He was training for the Race Across America; during night training, he was nearly killed on the road, and he decided not to do his night-time training on the bicycle, but instead bring it indoors. This was when he started to develop a business concept around indoor training.

== See also ==
- Mad Dogg Athletics – company owning intellectual property rights for original Johnny G Spinning Program.
