= Rouvy =

Indoor cycling platform

ROUVY is an indoor cycling software that combines 2D real-world video footage of cycling routes, GPS elevation data and augmented reality for use with a bicycle trainer.

== Gameplay & experience ==
Rouvy shows users a rider (avatar) overlaid on its video footage along with other exercise performance information, and advances as the user pedals on their trainer to replicate a real life ride. Resistance in the trainer is adjusted to simulate the actual gradient encountered on the route. The app allows riders to participate in a variety of cycling activities, such as hill climbing, time trials, races, group rides, structured training plans and interval training. The app also provides detailed performance data and analytics, allowing riders to track their progress over time.

Video footage from the routes often includes vehicles, other cyclists and even pedestrians, so is edited where needed to account for this, including road junctions where ordinarily, a rider may need to slow down or stop. For further realism, ROUVY includes an automatic braking function when riders encounter a bend or junction at high speed and need to slow down. The avatars in the footage may also briefly disappear if the video appears to show contact with another vehicle or obstacle.

ROUVY has a separate Companion app that works alongside the main indoor cycling app. It combines rider functions such remote control, fitness tracker, pause/resume controls, route browsing, event registration, fitness insights (Training Score, Recovery Score, FTP tracking), and a "Ride Later" playlist for planned workouts.

As of December 2025, ROUVY claimed routes in 71 countries globally.

== History ==
The idea for the app was developed by Czech brothers Petr and Jiří Samek.

In 2020, ROUVY became the virtual partner of La Vuelta and launched La Vuelta Virtual, an annual online event.

In August 2021, the company VirtualTraining behind the ROUVY brand was bought by the investment group Pale Fire Capital.

ROUVY is also a virtual partner of triathlon organizations P.T.O. and Challenge Roth.

In 2024, the company launched its Route Creator for Windows and Apple Mac devices which allows users to upload user-generated GPS-enabled footage of routes. The app then processes the footage to create a rideable course, using real-life video footage where available, allowing riders to explore new routes and places virtually, either privately or publicly.

=== Acquisitions ===
In January 2025, it was announced Rouvy had acquired competitor software Fulgaz from The Ironman Group, who purchased FulGaz in 2021. In addition to the purchase, the official press release stated Rouvy would become the "Official Digital Sports Platform of the global Ironman and Ironman 70.3 Triathlon Series” in a multi-year deal". Alvin Holbrook of Outside Magazine stated that after mass layoffs at Fulgaz, "it appears that Rouvy has purchased the FulGaz subscriber base and video gallery. Further, it has partnered with Ironman for access to its courses and routes."

In July 2025, Rouvy announced it had acquired Spain-based competitor software BKool, with Rouvy stating Bkool would maintain its brand and operate as an independent entity. At the time of the announcement, it was reported that Rouvy had more than 250,000 subscribers.

=== Acquisition by Zwift ===
On April 29, 2026, competitor platform Zwift announced its strategic acquisition of Rouvy to accelerate growth in the indoor cycling market. It was announced that both companies would continue to operate independently with separate roadmaps and subscription packages, and that Rouvy users would get official compatibility for Zwift's proprietary hardware (such as Zwift Ready trainers and Zwift Ride frames).

== See also ==
- Kinomap
- MyWhoosh
- Zwift
