= Roland Dupree Dance Academy =

Coordinates: 34.0722°N 118.3662°W

Roland Dupree Dance Academy was a major dance centre founded by Roland Dupree in Hollywood located on third Street just west of Crescent Heights on the North Side of the Street.

It drew the interest of dancers from around the world due to the academy’s large number of instructors who worked in fields such as Television, Stage and Film. Examples of which are Carrie Hamilton (deceased daughter of comedian and actress, Carol Burnett) and Michael Rooney (son of acting legend Mickey Rooney) who taught classes there in the 1970s. Other teachers, such as Joe Bennett, Carol Connor, Hama, Jacqui, Bill Landrum, Joe Tremaine, and Karen Voight, launched themselves and their own dance academies into success as a result of Dupree Dance Academy.

Equally as important to the success of the studio was the technical discipline introduced into the field of jazz dance. Dupree partnered with Dolores Terry (dancer, teacher, choreographer and eventually producer), who brought her expertise to the creation of the academy's stringent technical warm-up. It included 4 distinct levels (beginner through advanced) and included ballet, Horton, Graham and Cole techniques. Professional level classes were the only ones at the academy in which the technical warm-up might differ, at the preference of the choreographer teaching. In this way the Dupree Dance Academy nurtured and developed professional level dancers as well as providing them with opportunities to be directly involved with working choreographers.

It was when Roland partnered with Mary Jean Valente to open Dupree Casting that the first Casting Service specialising in Dancers for Movies, Television and Commercial Print Media was created. As a result, Mary Jean Valente brought together Directors, Producers and Production Companies in the desire to eliminate the cattle call process of dance auditioning. However, Roland Dupree sold his business in the mid 1980s and has since been hosting dance conventions around America with Dupree Dance Expo. The Roland Dupree Dance Academy itself has now been taken over by the child acting facility, Youth Academy of Dramatic Arts (YADA).
