= Karen Voight =

American fitness expert (born 1955)

- Born: 1955 (age 70–71)
- Occupation: Fitness expert
- Writing career
- Subjects: Health and fitness

Karen Voight (born 1955) is an American fitness expert. She has produced approximately 30 exercise videos, a book, Voight: Precision Training for Body and Mind, and a health column in the Los Angeles Times.

== Early life & career ==
Voight began to study ballet at age 3. In 1980 she started teaching an exercise class at Dupree Dance Academy, in West Hollywood, and in 1982 she started her fitness business, Voight Fitness and Dance, with her husband Harry Siegel. By 1997, the business included seven exercise videos, mail-order sales of videos and exercise equipment, a product endorsement, a book, an exercise studio in Santa Monica, personal training, international workshops, appearances and products at Nordstrom stores, and a deal with AOL to participate in the fitness site Thrive.

Voight produced, filmed, starred in, and edited six of her first seven videos. She co-starred in the exercise video "Your Personal Best With Elle Macpherson" (1994) and consulted with Paula Abdul on her dance workout videos.

== Recognition ==
She received the awards "IDEA Fitness Instructor of the Year" in 1992 and "IDEA Businessperson of the Year" in 1994.
