= Stationary bicycle =

Exercise equipment

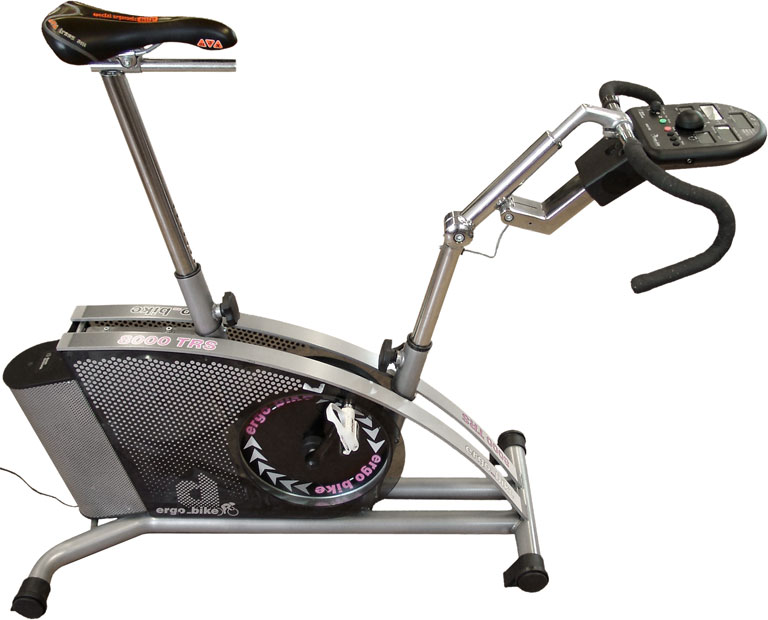
Stationary bicycle

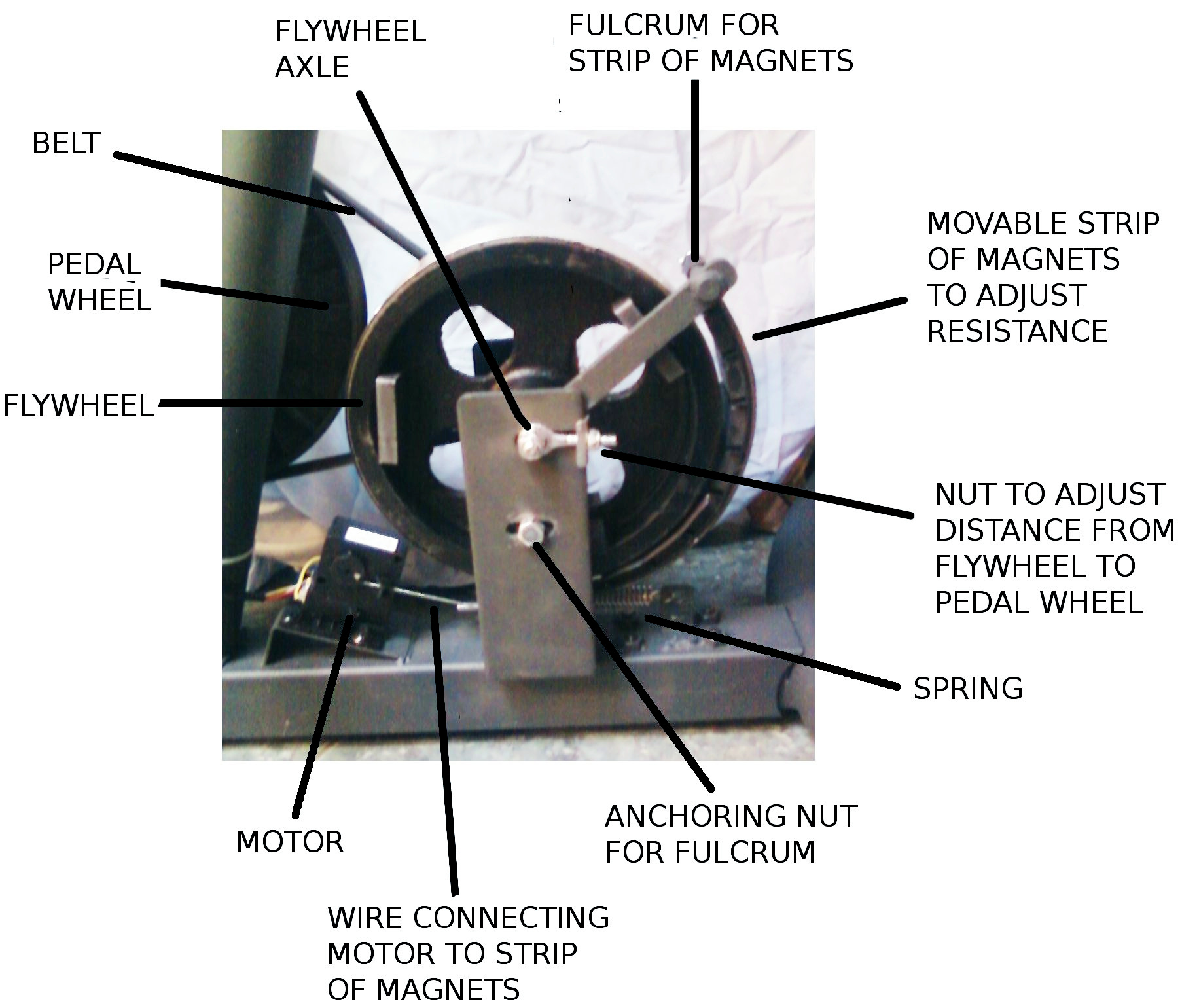
Magnetic resistance mechanism

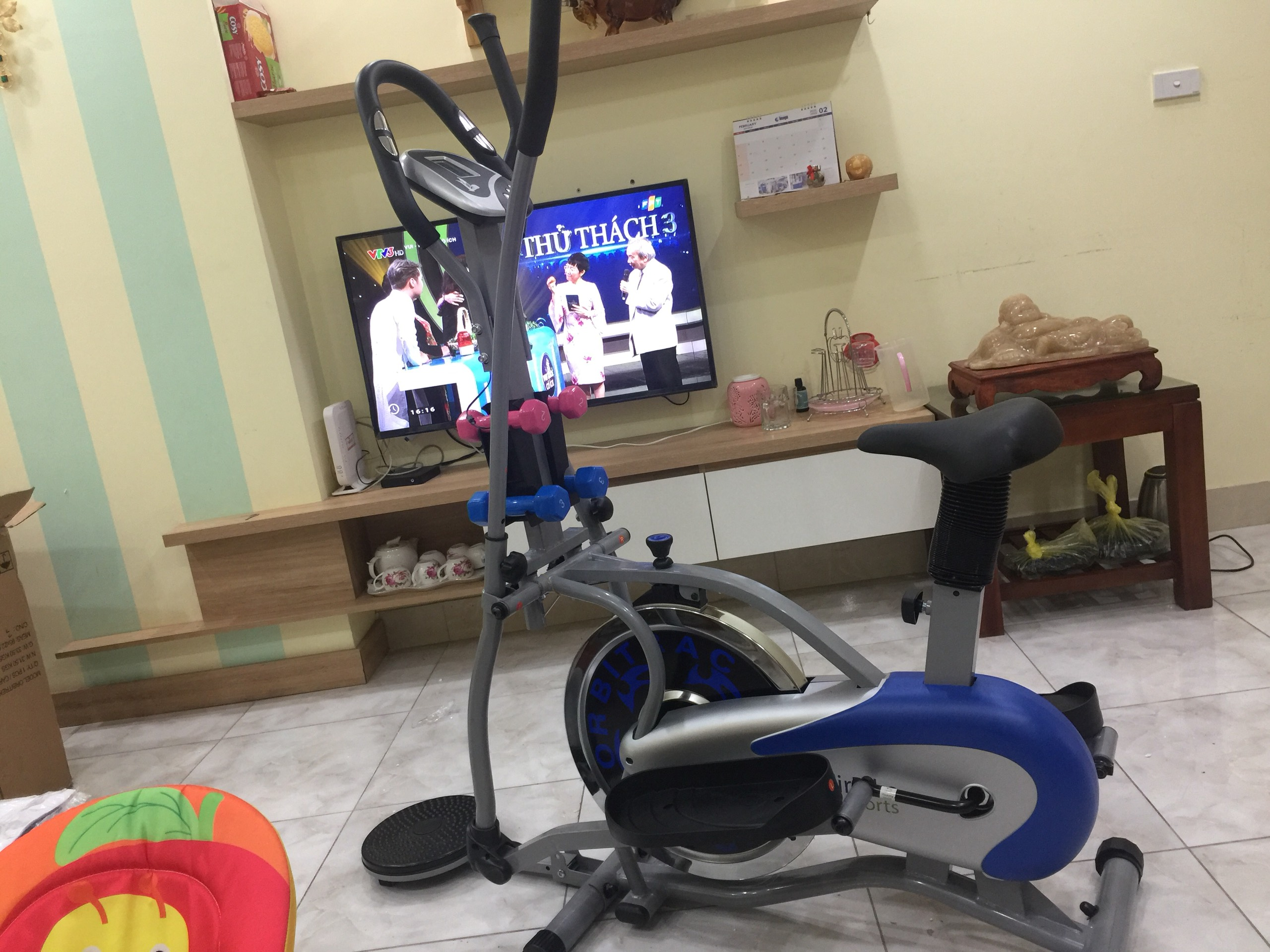
A hybrid exercise bike and elliptical machine

A stationary bicycle (also known as exercise bicycle, exercise bike, spinning bike, spin bike, or exercycle) is a device used as exercise equipment for indoor cycling. It includes a saddle, pedals, and some form of handlebars arranged as on a (stationary) bicycle.

Resembling a bicycle without wheels, a stationary bicycle is usually a special-purpose exercise machine that may be adapted for stationary exercise from an ordinary bicycle by placing it on bicycle rollers or a trainer. Rollers and trainers are often used by racing cyclists to warm up before racing, or to train indoors on their own machines.

== History ==
The ancestors of modern stationary bicycles date back to the end of the eighteenth century. The Gymnasticon was an early example.

== Types ==
Some stationary bike models feature handlebars that are connected to the pedals so that the upper body can be exercised along with the lower body (much like an elliptical trainer). Most exercise bikes come with mechanisms to apply resistance to the pedals, enhancing the intensity of the exercise. Resistance mechanisms include magnets, fans, and friction mechanisms. Some models allow the user to pedal backwards to exercise antagonist muscles which are not exercised in forward pedaling. Exercise bicycles are typically manufactured using a crankshaft and bottom bracket, which turns a flywheel by means of a belt or chain. The bearings on these moving parts wear with use and may require replacement.

Specialized indoor bicycles manufactured using a weighted flywheel at the front are used in the indoor cycling exercises called spinning.

People on exercise bikes

A variety of indoor mini-cycles, sometimes referred to as exercise pedallers, have emerged as portable, low-cost substitutes for traditional stationary bicycles. They are useful when exercisers are unable to access their stationary bicycles from their homes or local gyms when travels or at work.

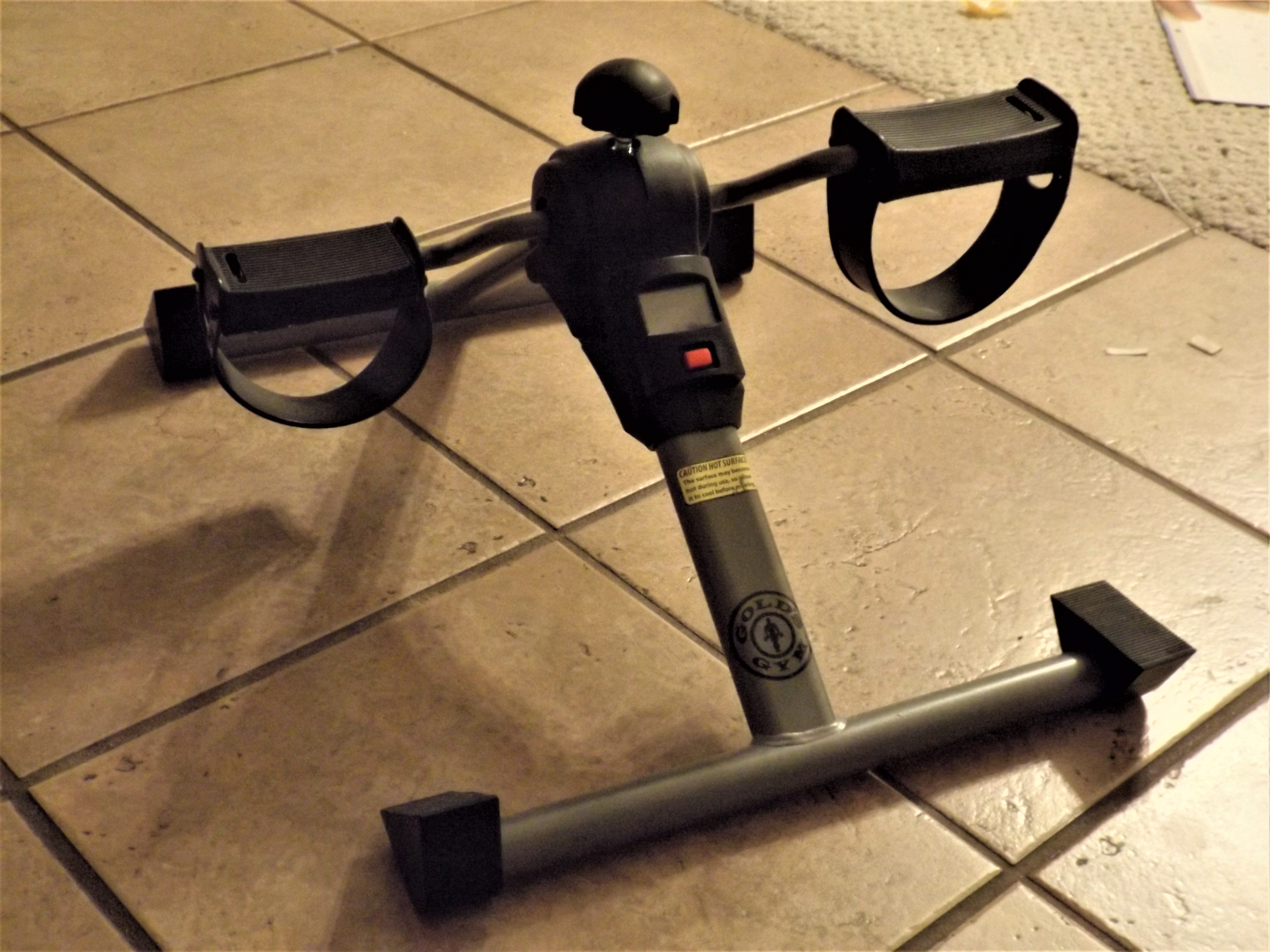
A folding mini-cycle, built with a friction mechanism

== Uses ==
Exercise bikes are used for exercise, to increase general fitness, for weight loss, and for training for cycle events. The exercise bike has long been used for physical therapy because of the low-impact, safe, and effective cardiovascular exercise it provides. The low-impact movement involved in operating an exercise bike does not put much stress on joints and does not involve sporadic motions that some other fitness equipment may require. However, as with typical biking, extended use of a stationary bike has been linked to decreased sexual function.

Stationary bikes are also used for physical testing, i.e. as ergometers for measuring power. Traditionally this is done by imposing a certain level of resistance mechanically and/or measuring this. gives a good overview. Modern ergometers and even many consumer exercise bikes are fitted with electronic sensors and displays.

Ergometers, such as CEVIS (Cycle Ergometer with Vibration Isolation and Stabilization System), are used in space (e.g. in the ISS) to counter cardiovascular deconditioning in the microgravity environment.

Exercise bikes are frequently used in cardiac rehabilitation programs to help individuals recover from heart-related conditions or surgeries. The controlled and adjustable nature of stationary biking makes it an ideal choice for gradually improving cardiovascular health after cardiac events.

== See also ==
- Bicycle trainer
- Elliptical trainer
- Outline of cycling
- Peloton Interactive
- Zwift
