= Gymnasticon =

Exercise machine

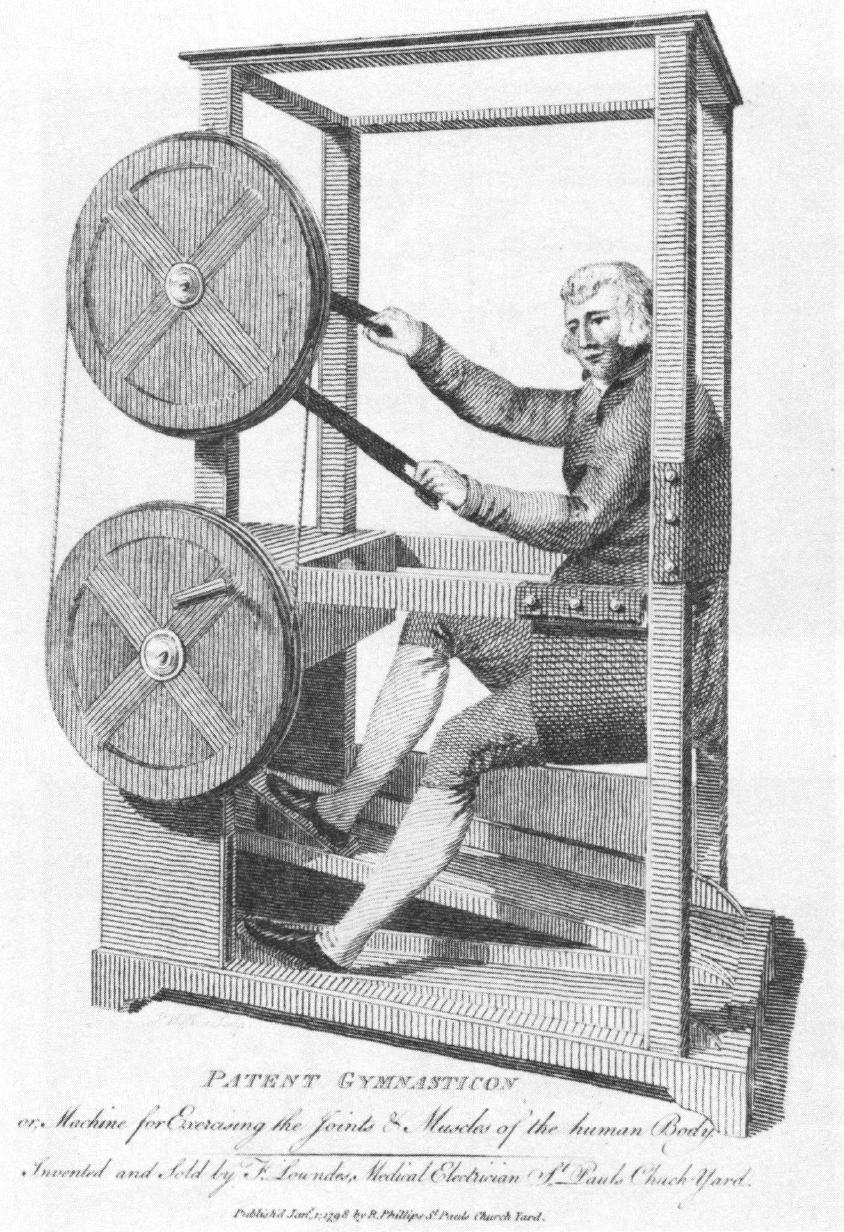
Engraving of the Gymnasticon in action, 1798

The Gymnasticon was an early exercise machine resembling a stationary bicycle, invented in 1796 by Francis Lowndes. Its function was to exercise the joints, either "in all parts of the body at once, or partially."

== Background ==
The Gymnasticon emerged from the newly developed science of orthopedics, originated by Nicolas Andry in 1741. It was an early example of a series of new technologies in gymnastics that would lead to the development of physical therapy in the nineteenth century.

Lowndes, the device's inventor, had previously established himself as an authority on medical electricity, the use of electricity as a therapy for both disease and injury. His book Observations on Medical Electricity, published in 1787, contained descriptions of a number of cases "in which electricity has either cured the disease, or given great relief."

== Mechanism ==
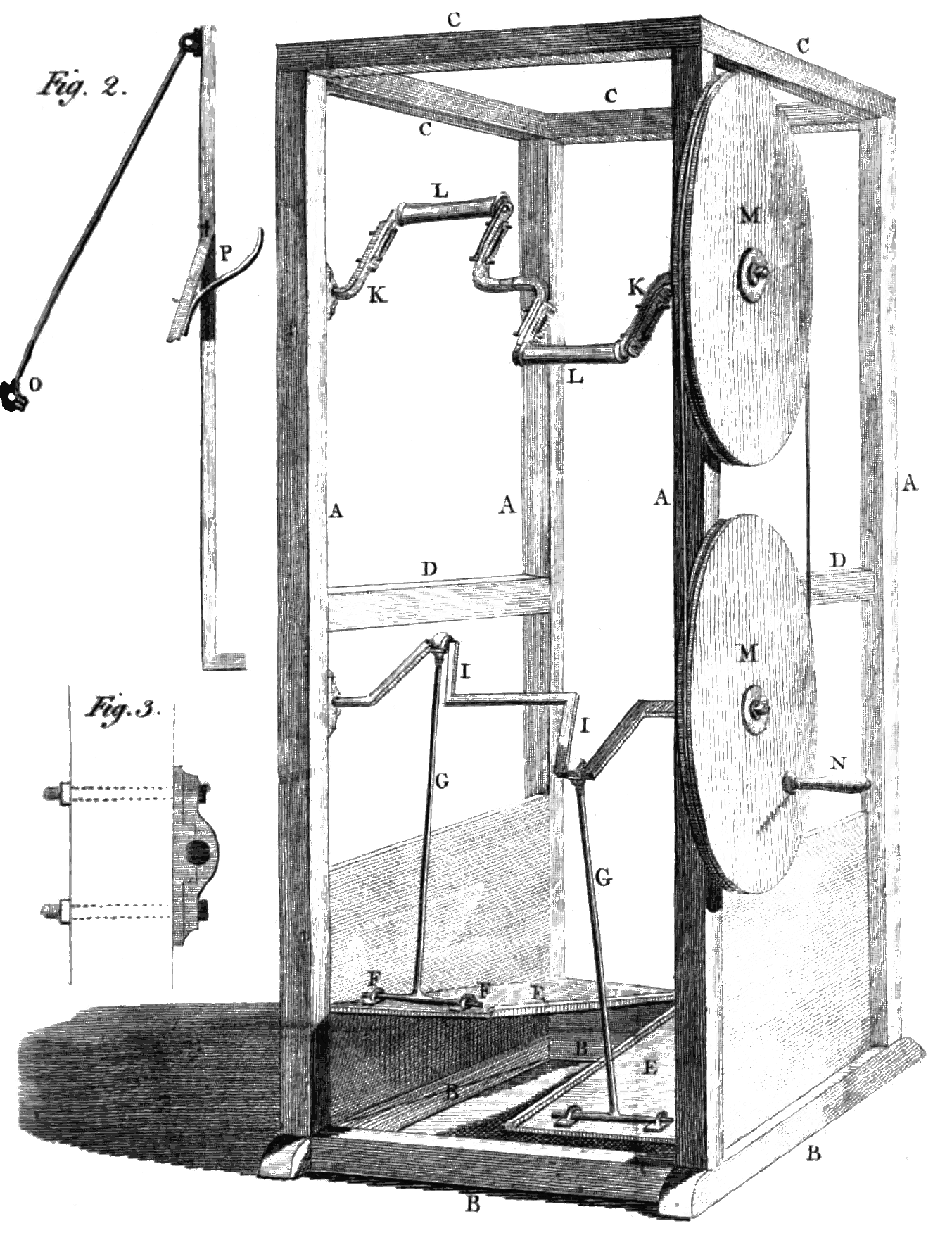
Mechanism of the machine, from Lowndes's patent application. Figure 2 shows a treadle and the crankrod it drives, figure 3 the flange that supports the upper cranks (labeled K).

The Gymnasticon depended on a set of flywheels that connected the wooden treadles for the feet to cranks for the hands, which could drive each other or operate independently. The figure on the right shows the inner workings of the machines. Labels A, B, C, and D show the structural frame. The treadles are marked E, and are connected to the frame by metal brackets or cocks (F), derived from clockmaking. "Each treadle has two, and the centered Screws which pass through them embrace the cross, or lower extremities of the treadle-lifters, GG, so as to admit of easy motion." The lower cranks, labeled I, are adjustable, to suit the needs of the patient, as are the upper cranks, K. The upper cranks are connected to the lower by means of two flywheels (M); a band fixing the motion of the two together can be attached or removed as needed. Figures 2 and 3 represent the means of connecting the treadles and handles, respectively, to the central system. O is the treadle's "divided head, with the upper division or cap screwed down. P is a spring or a spring-board, destined to give action to the joints and muscles of the feet. The front or toe extremities of these spring-boards are held by springs, or cocks and centered points, fixed to each of the treadle-boards E E; their back or heel extremities are left loose, to admit of elevation, when the springs are compressed (by the floor or any other means employed) by the descent of the treadles E E". N is a crank allowing external operation.

== Uses ==
In his patent, Lowndes described the machine as intended simply "to give and apply motion and exercise, voluntary or involuntary, to the limbs, joints, and muscles of the human body. A magazine article at the time noted, however, that Lowndes had claimed success in using the machine to treat "gout, palsy, rheumatism, debility, contraction, etc." It was specifically designed for the sick, with an external crank that could be used to force involuntary motion in the joints of a person too disabled to work the machine alone. However, its ability to provide exercise for people forced to be sedentary by circumstances (such as students) made it useful for the healthy as well.
