= Zwift =

Multiplayer online cycling platform

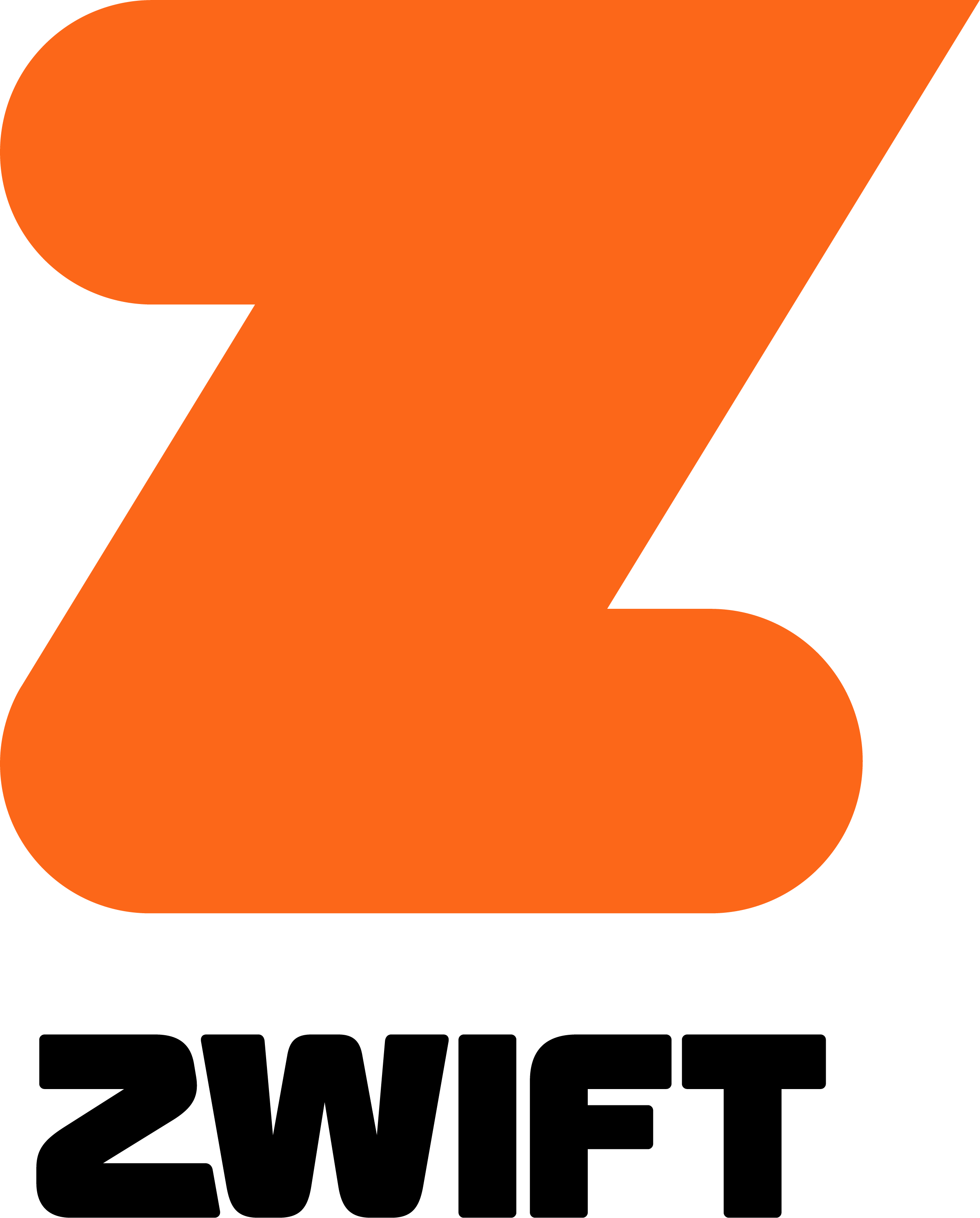
- Industry: Gaming, fitness
- Founded: 2014; 12 years ago
- Founders: Jon Mayfield; Eric Min; Scott Barger; Alarik Myrin
- Headquarters: California, United States
- Website: zwift.com

Zwift is a multiplayer, online cycling and running physical training program that enables users to interact, train, and compete in a virtual world.

Zwift was developed by Zwift Inc., which was co-founded by Jon Mayfield, Eric Min, Scott Barger, and Alarik Myrin, in California, United States in 2014.

The Zwift game was released in its beta version in September 2014, in partnership with TRUE Communications/InGoodTaste, and became a paid product with a fee of US$10 per month in October 2015, (equivalent to $14 in 2025). They raised their monthly membership to US$14.99 in November 2017, (equivalent to $20 in 2025). They again announced a raise in price of the monthly membership to US$19.99 in May 2024.

== Early history ==
In 2012/13, Eric Min had recently sold his previous company, Sakonnet Technology. Min, a lifelong cyclist, found himself confined to riding indoors, and dissatisfied with current interactive options, he believed he could improve on them by "making cycling social". Around this time, Min saw an online post by programmer Jon Mayfield describing a "3D trainer program" he was developing as a hobby project. Min promptly contacted Mayfield, making arrangements to fly to Los Angeles to speak to him; the two agreed to co-found a company around the project.

=== Beta ===
The first virtual world, Jarvis Island, was released as an invite-only beta product on September 30, 2014. The product proved unexpectedly popular, and more than 13,000 applications were received for 1,000 beta places. The launch took place simultaneously in Rapha Clubhouses in London, New York City and San Francisco. By May 2015, Zwift had moved into open beta. A virtual version of the Richmond (Virginia) 2015 UCI Road World Championships Course was introduced on September 3, 2015.

=== Launch ===
On October 29, 2015, Zwift launched as a fully fledged product with a $10 monthly subscription fee. The next day, it was reported that Strava had partnered with Zwift to provide its premium members with two free months of Zwift.

== Technology ==
Zwift allows players to ride their bicycles on stationary trainers while navigating through virtual worlds. Players may cycle freely around the game world and join organized group rides, races, or workouts with other users. Zwift uses ANT+ or Bluetooth Low Energy technologies to transmit data that, in combination with athlete weight and equipment choices, is used to convert the athlete's efforts as speed and power. "Smart" trainers, which include a built-in power meter, permit accuracy in the measurement of watts as well as enabling an immersive technology experience, where resistance is applied or lessened to simulate the gradient encountered on the virtual course. Zwift estimates the power of users on conventional trainers via the user's cadence and the power curve of a wide range of specified trainers.

Zwift was originally available only for users with personal computers. In December 2016, Zwift launched on iOS, and in November 2017, the application became available via Apple TV. Zwift also includes a mobile app which allows users to change direction, take screenshots, communicate via messaging, use power-ups and follow other athletes.

=== Hardware ===
Zwift's released its first hardware product in November 2018 with the release of the Zwift RunPod, a Bluetooth footpod designed to transmit treadmill running speed to the platform. The company later shifted its focus toward indoor cycling equipment, launching the Zwift Hub direct-drive smart trainer in October 2022. This was followed by the introduction of the Zwift Play handlebar controllers in June 2023, and the single-cog Zwift Hub One trainer in October 2023. In late 2024, Zwift launched its own Smart Bike, the Zwift Ride, which features built-in controls and is compatible with the Wahoo Kickr Core.

== Investment ==
In December 2018, Zwift raised a Series B investment of $120 million: the investment round was led by Highland Europe, an English investment company. The CEO Eric Min announced the money would be spent on categories expansion, including esports tournaments and further development of Zwift Run. Zwift ranked fifth in Fast Company's 2019 Most Innovative Companies (Sports Sector).

In September 2020, Zwift raised a $450 million minority investment led by investment firm KKR. It was stated the funds would be used to push the development of Zwift's core software platform and bring Zwift-designed hardware to market.

=== Acquisition of Rouvy ===
On April 29, 2026, Zwift announced its strategic acquisition of Rouvy to accelerate growth in the indoor cycling market. It was announced that both companies would continue to operate independently with separate roadmaps and subscription packages, and that Rouvy users would get official compatibility for Zwift's proprietary hardware (such as Zwift Ready trainers and Zwift Ride frames).

== Virtual Worlds ==
There are twelve worlds, or maps, in Zwift. Only one is always available: Watopia, a fictitious island, which has seen some of its expansions lean into fantasy, including dinosaurs and riding into an active volcano. This world also includes Alpe du Zwift, a recreation of the famous Alpe d'Huez climb. Nine worlds are rotated according to a predetermined schedule. They are:

- Richmond, a realistic depiction of the course used by professional riders in the 2015 UCI Road World Championships in Richmond, Virginia, United States. The course is urban and the first "real world" map Zwift attempted;
- London, inspired by sections of the 2016 Prudential RideLondon course;
- New York, a futuristic version of Central Park, with flying cars and elevated glass roads;
- Innsbruck, which recreates parts of the 2018 UCI Road World Championships course;
- Yorkshire, a recreation of the finishing circuit of the 2019 UCI Road World Championships course in Harrogate;
- France, inspired by the varied scenery of the Tour de France, including a recreation of the famous Mont Ventoux climb;
- Paris, a recreation of the traditional finishing circuit of the Tour de France on the Champs-Élysées;
- Makuri Islands, a fantasy landscape inspired by Japanese culture (released on June 1, 2021);
- Scotland, which was created to host the 2023 UCI Cycling Esports World Championships

The last two worlds can only be accessed as part of a scheduled event:

- Bologna, which recreates the opening time trial of the 2019 Giro d'Italia;
- Crit City, which is available for short, criterium-style races

In July 2023 Zwift began opening “climb portals” that allow the rider access to real-world hill climbs that represent the grade and milage of famous hills but do so in an abstract environment of color and shapes not earthly environments. As of March 2024 there were 20 such climbs.

== Community ==
An article in La Velocita called the game's fans "Zwifters". As of June 2021, Zwift had more than 334,000 "fans" on the social media platform Facebook. As of January 2018, there were over 550,000 accounts.

Facebook chief executive Mark Zuckerberg used the platform to help continue training after suffering a broken arm.

The first documented Zwift race was held March 3, 2015 organized through Facebook and modeled after weeknight race-riding, a common community event in the road racing subculture of cycling. One of the earliest groups to offer established racing on Zwift was "KISS", which started races in late 2015 and had grown by 2018 to become one of the largest organizers on the platform.

As of September 2022, Zwift users had used the platform to amass:

- Total miles ridden: 3.37 billion
- Total meters climbed: 53 billion
- Total watt hours: 26.9 billion
- Average elevation: 277m
- Average distance: 17.47 miles
- Imperial centuries: 171k
- Ride ons received: 1.11 billion
- Workout activities: 74.3 million
- Weekly races: 1000+
- Peak concurrent users: 47k
- Total moving time: 191 million hours
- Pro athlete accounts: 2,395

== Zwift Academy ==
=== Cycling ===
In early 2016 Zwift launched the Zwift Academy program, which utilises the platform to test would-be riders for their suitability for professional bicycle racing. In the inaugural competition, 1,200 cyclists entered, with former marathon runner Leah Thorvilson being crowned the winner and securing a contract with the Canyon//SRAM team for 2017.

The Academy expanded for 2017, adding a men's competition: that year the women's competition was won by ex-triathlete Tanja Erath, who finished first in a field of 2,100 entrants and won a contract with Canyon-SRAM for 2018, whilst the first men's competition was won by former speed skater Ollie Jones, who beat 9,200 other cyclists to secure a place with the Dimension Data for Qhubeka team.

The Academy initially centered on an eight-week training program incorporating 16 events, with interval training and virtual group rides and races, before ten riders are selected for the semi-final stage and then a final three are chosen to compete against each other in real life.

Zwift Academy Winners
Year	Men	Women
2016		Leah Thorvilson
2017	Ollie Jones	Tanja Erath
2018	Martin Lavrič	Ella Harris
2019	Drew Christensen	Jessica Pratt
2020	Jay Vine	Neve Bradbury
2021	Alex Bogna	Maud Oudeman
2022	Luca Vergallito	Alex Morrice
2023	Louis Kitzki	Maddie Le Roux
2024	Noah Ramsay	Emily Dixon

=== Triathlon ===
In 2018, the Zwift Academy talent identification concept was expanded to include the sport of triathlon. Four athletes were selected to the Specialized Zwift Academy Triathlon Team; Rachael Norfleet (United States), Geert Janssens (Belgium), Golo Philippe Röhrken (Germany), and Bex Rimmington (United Kingdom).

== Elite Esports Cycling Events ==
In 2019, Zwift appointed Craig Edmondson as CEO at Zwift Esports, and produced two e-race series events. Participants were professional athletes competing on the platform.

The 2019 debut of a professional cycling esports League (KISS Super League), which was announced back in late 2018, with the participation of four UCI Continental men's professional cycling teams confirmed: Team Wiggins Le Col, Canyon–SRAM, Hagens Berman Axeon and Team Dimension Data for Qhubeka U23.

In July 2020, due to the Tour de France being postponed because of the COVID-19 pandemic, Zwift was used to host a virtual tour consisting of six stages.

In December 2020, the first ever UCI Cycling Esports World Championship was held on Zwift.

In March 2023, it was announced that Zwift would be a part of the Olympics Esports Series as the Cycling event.

== Sponsorships ==
Since 2022, Zwift has been the title sponsor of the Tour de France Femmes and Paris–Roubaix Femmes cycling races.

== See also ==
- MyWhoosh
- Rouvy
- Kinomap
