= Indoor cycling =

Cycling exercise

Indoor cycling, often called spinning, is a form of exercise with classes focusing on endurance, strength, intervals, high intensity (race days) and recovery, and involves using a special stationary exercise bicycle with a weighted flywheel in a classroom setting. When people took cycling indoors in the late 19th century, whether for reasons of weather or convenience, technology created faster, more compact and efficient machines over time. The first iterations of the stationary bike ranged from the vertical Gymnasticon to regular bicycles on rollers.

== Class content and goals ==
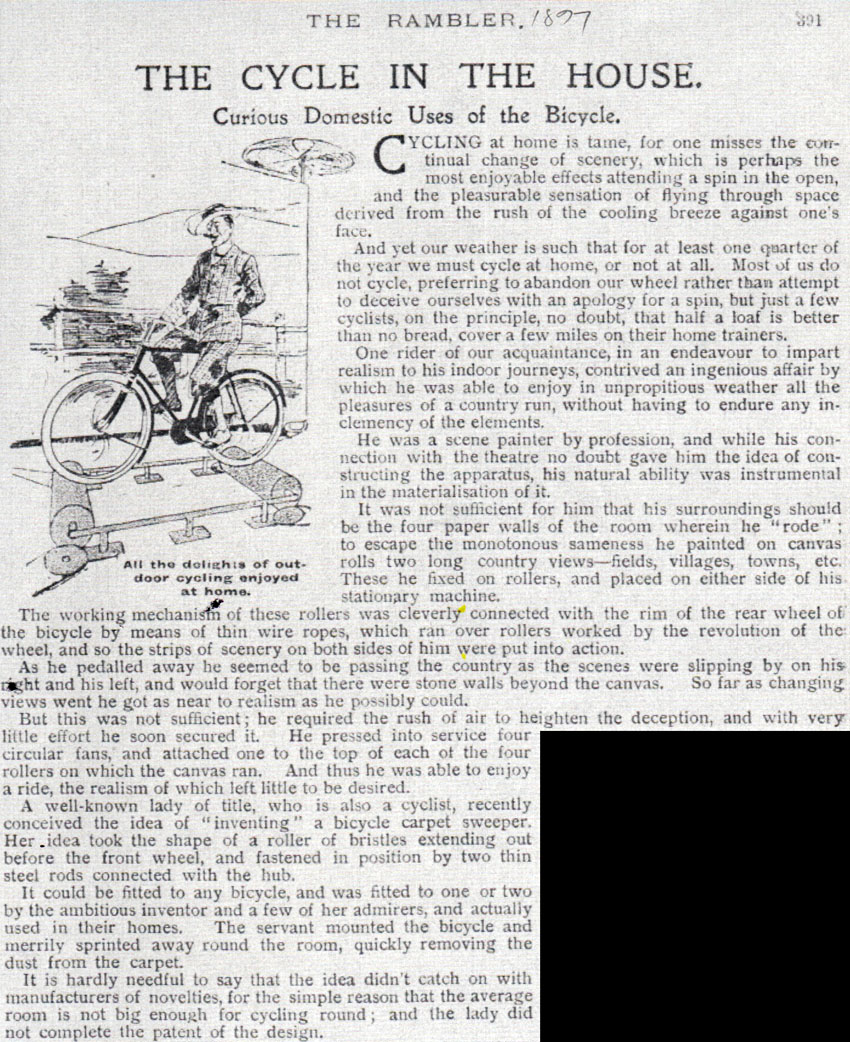
"All the delight of outdoor cycling enjoyed at home" – article from 1897 describing indoor spin.

Classes generally use specialized stationary bicycles. Features include a mechanical device to modify the difficulty of pedaling, specially shaped handlebars, and multiple adjustment points to fit the bicycle to a range of riders. Many have a weighted flywheel, which simulates the effects of inertia and momentum when riding a real bicycle. The pedals are equipped with toe clips as on sports bicycles to allow one foot to pull up when the other is pushing down. They may alternatively have clipless receptacles for use with cleated cycling shoes. Padded shorts aid comfort and avoid the chafing caused by the sewn seams in underwear.

If the exercise is not done correctly or the rider's position is bad, injuries can occur; problems with the lower back and knees are most common. To avoid injury and aid comfort it is important to make sure the bio-mechanical position of the rider is correct. Group cycling bikes have a wide range of adjustment, and it is essential to obtain the correct setup prior to riding. The seat position must be right for the participant's height. The height of the seat should be in level with the hip when the participant is standing next to the cycle. Horizontally, the seat should be set in order for the front of the knee to be directly in vertical line with the ball of the foot when the pedal is pointing forward. This results in a position where the knee is slightly bent at an angle between 25% and 35% when the leg is extended with the foot resting flat at the bottom of the pedal stroke. Handlebar height can be adjusted for comfort; less experienced riders may want to set them higher to ease lower back discomfort. A reasonable reference point is to set it in level with the seat. When grabbing the handlebars with a flat back, there should be a slight bend in the rider's elbows. If their elbows are locked straight or uncomfortably bent, the rider should adjust the horizontal aspect of the handlebars.

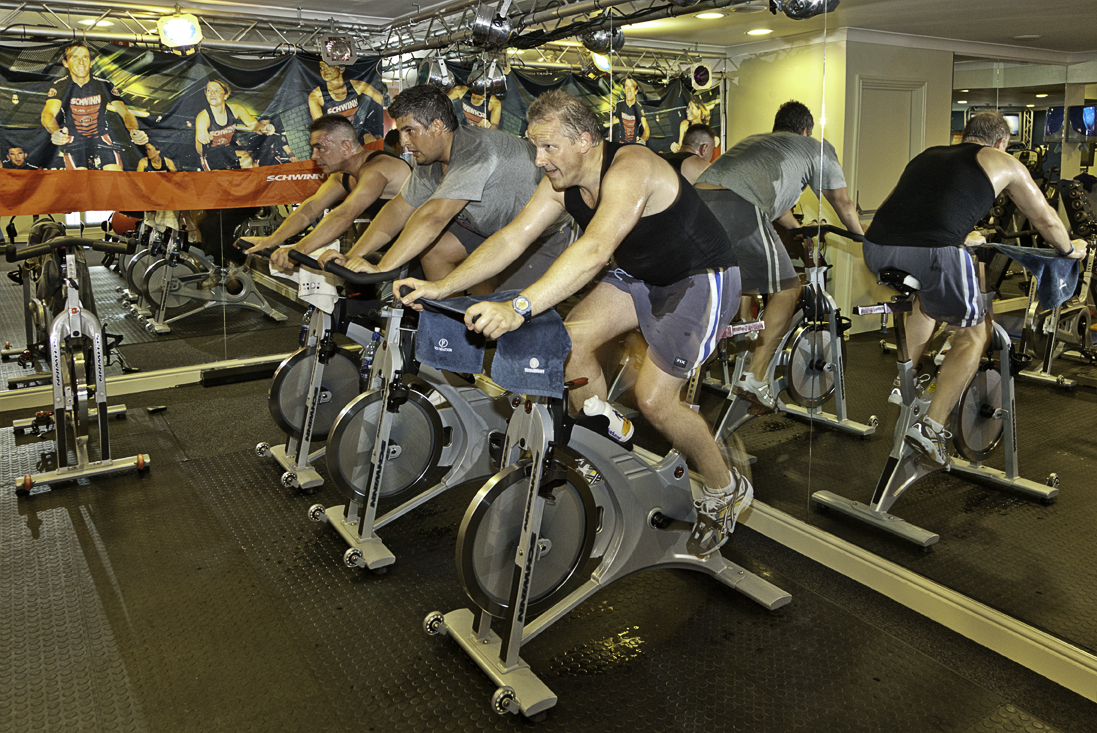
Indoor cycling – static bicycle health regimen. United Kingdom

A typical class involves a single instructor at the front of the class who leads the participants through routines that are designed to simulate terrain and situations similar to riding a bike outdoors. Some of the movements and positions include hill climbs, sprints and interval training. A well-trained instructor uses music, motivation, visualization and enthusiastic coaching to lead students through a ride that best suits their fitness level and goals. Most instructors will lead what is called an interval ride, where students will sprint, run, climb, and jump all in the same ride, but there will be a definable pattern to the exercises. In the early 2000s, "terrain-based" classes that simulate outdoor conditions (e.g., wind resistance) were introduced. Terrain-based classes are designed to improve a rider's outdoor skill set and increase endurance while providing an intense cardio-based workout.

Participants set goals based on their heart rate, which can be measured by hand or using a heart rate monitor and ride simulated variations in terrain by altering resistance and cadence. Some participants choose to maintain a moderate, aerobic intensity level, with a heart rate of between 50 and 85% of max while others drive their heart rates higher in intervals of anaerobic activity to levels of between 85 and 92%.

One of the major advantages of indoor cycling is that each participant can exactly control his/her level of intensity to suit ability or fitness level but still remain as a group together. The classes can therefore be heterogeneous. As an alternative, participants can judge their level of exertion relative to a perceived exertion scale. The instructor should advise a recommended exertion scale from 1 (no exertion at all) to 10 (maximum exertion). Each rider is permitted to dictate how hard he/she chooses to work with the instructor providing active and dynamic encouragement together with technical and practical advice throughout the class.

Besides burning (on average) between 300 and 500 kcal in 60 minutes, indoor cycling also strengthens the muscles of the lower body. It tones the quadriceps and hamstrings, along with working the back and hips without placing the same strain present in typical weight-bearing exercises. It can be difficult to stay at the moderate level in a class that is geared toward more intensity. The difficulty of the workout is modulated in two ways:

1. By varying the resistance on a flywheel attached to the pedals. The resistance is controlled by a knob, wheel or lever that the rider operates, causing the flywheel brake (a common bicycle brake, a friction wheel, a magnetic eddy current brake, a viscoelastic fluid brake, or a strap running around the flywheel) to tighten. On most bikes the brake can be adjusted from completely loose, providing no resistance to pedaling beyond the inertia of the flywheel, to so tight that the rider cannot move the pedals. Usually riders who can't pedal at the resistance called out by the instructor are encouraged to ride at a level at which they feel comfortable yet challenged.
2. By changing the cadence (the speed at which the pedals turn). Pedaling at a higher rate expends more energy than pedaling at a lower rate with the same resistance. Correct cadence is between the range of 80 to 110 RPM for seated flat, standing flat (running) and jumping and 60 to 80 RPM for seated climb, standing climb, running with resistance and jumps on a hill. Sprints are taken under hill resistance building cadence up to no more than 110 RPM. Seated sprints are most suitable as the rider maintains full control of posture at all times and will avoid falling due to exhaustion. A correct sprint should last from 10 to 25 seconds, leaving the rider exhausted in the 85 to 92% max heart rate range.

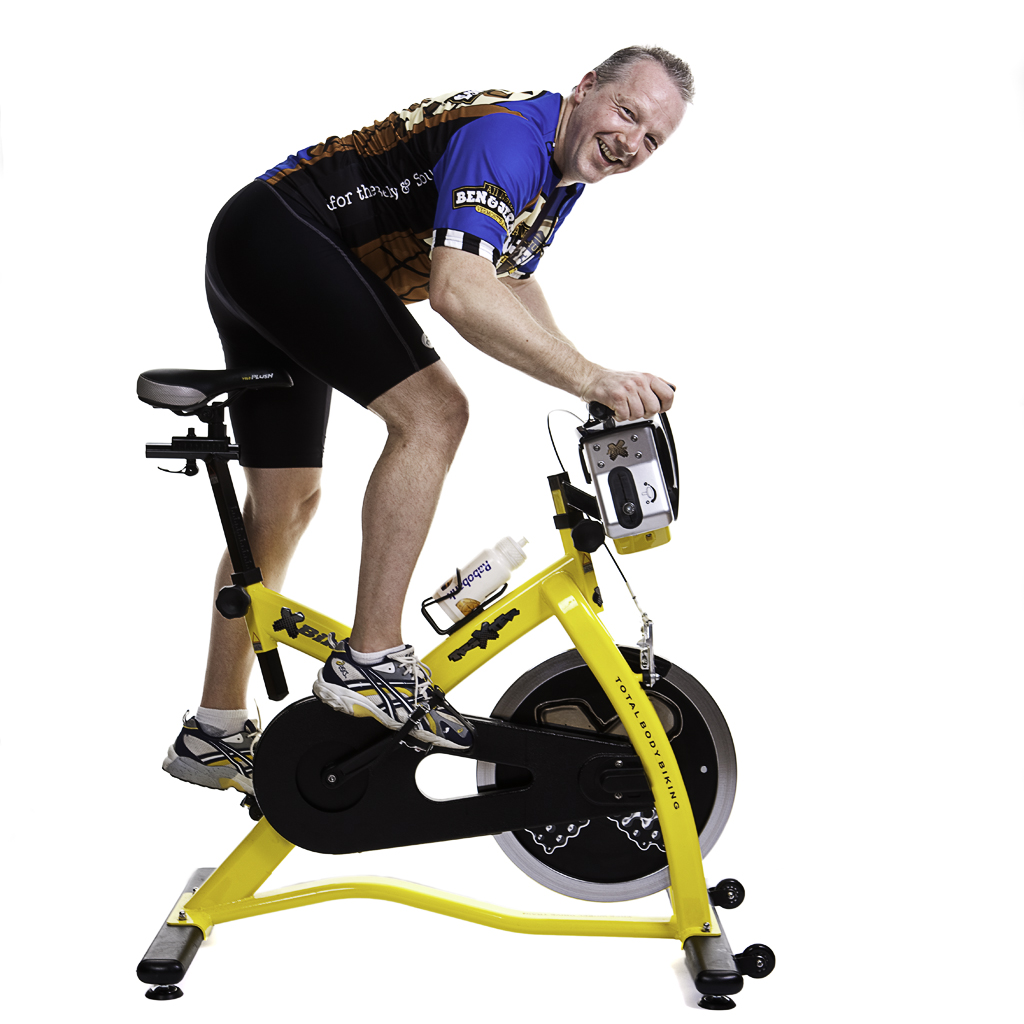
Typical fixed wheel ergonomically adjustable variable resistance bike

There are five core movements in the Spinning programme.

- Seated flat, with hands at the center part of the handlebars. This is hand position one. This position should be used only when seated, for flat road simulations and during the warm-up and cool down. Cadence between 80 and 110 RPM.
- Standing flat (also known as running), with hands wide on the back 12–14″ part of the handlebars that crosses the rider's body. This is hand position two. Proper form for standing while running requires the body to be more upright and the back of the legs touching or enveloping the point of the saddle, with the center of gravity directly over the crank. The pressure of body weight should never rest excessively on the handlebars. Cadence is between 80 and 110 RPM
- Jumps, (also known as lifts), a combination of seated and standing with riders hands at position two for durations of between two and eight seconds. Cadence between 80 and 110 RPM.
- Seated climb with hands at position two, increased resistance and lower cadence of 60–80 RPM.
- Standing climb with hands wide and forward so the thumb tips are touching the far end of the handlebars (hand position three). The rider is canted slightly forward so that maximum force can be exerted onto the pedals with heavy resistance and a cadence of 60–80 RPM.

These five movements each work a different part of the body and focus on different leg muscle groups. The rider should always maintain control of the flywheel by having resistance applied and remaining below a cadence of 110 RPM. Not all bikes have a freewheel, or 'smart release', and it is possible that the flywheel will 'run away' with the rider with the potential for causing injury. The rider should be able to maintain perfectly even pedal rotations at high resistance. This becomes difficult below 60 RPM cadence and failing to make 'perfect circles' increases the risk of knee and hip injury. A road cyclist will normally have a natural pedal cadence, of about 85 RPM and will control changes in terrain by changing gear to maintain this rate. The goal of the spinning program is not to exceed this natural rate by more than 25 RPM higher (110 RPM) or lower (60 RPM) There are five further advanced movements based on those listed above.

- Running with resistance
- Jumps on a hill
- Seated flat sprint
- Seated hill sprint
- Standing hill sprint

Most indoor cycling classes are coached with music. Riders may synchronize their pedalling to be in time with the rhythm of the music, thus providing an external stimulus to encourage a certain tempo. Often, the music chosen by the instructor is dance music or rock music set to a dance beat (i.e. 4/4 time), but not necessarily. Cover versions of well known songs with a pronounced beat may be included. This tends to help motivate participants to work harder than they might otherwise. The instructor also may choose specific songs for sprints, climbs, and jumps. While the music provides a tempo cue, the cadence does not need to be a multiple of the beat in order for the rider to feel in rhythm; the music therefore helps a rider maintain any constant cadence, not just a cadence that matches the beat. It may depend on the level of exertion whether or not someone changes position or the instructor can tell the class to change.

A variation known as "aqua cycling" or "hydrospinning" also exists. In this, the stationary bicycles are underwater in a pool.

== Gallery ==
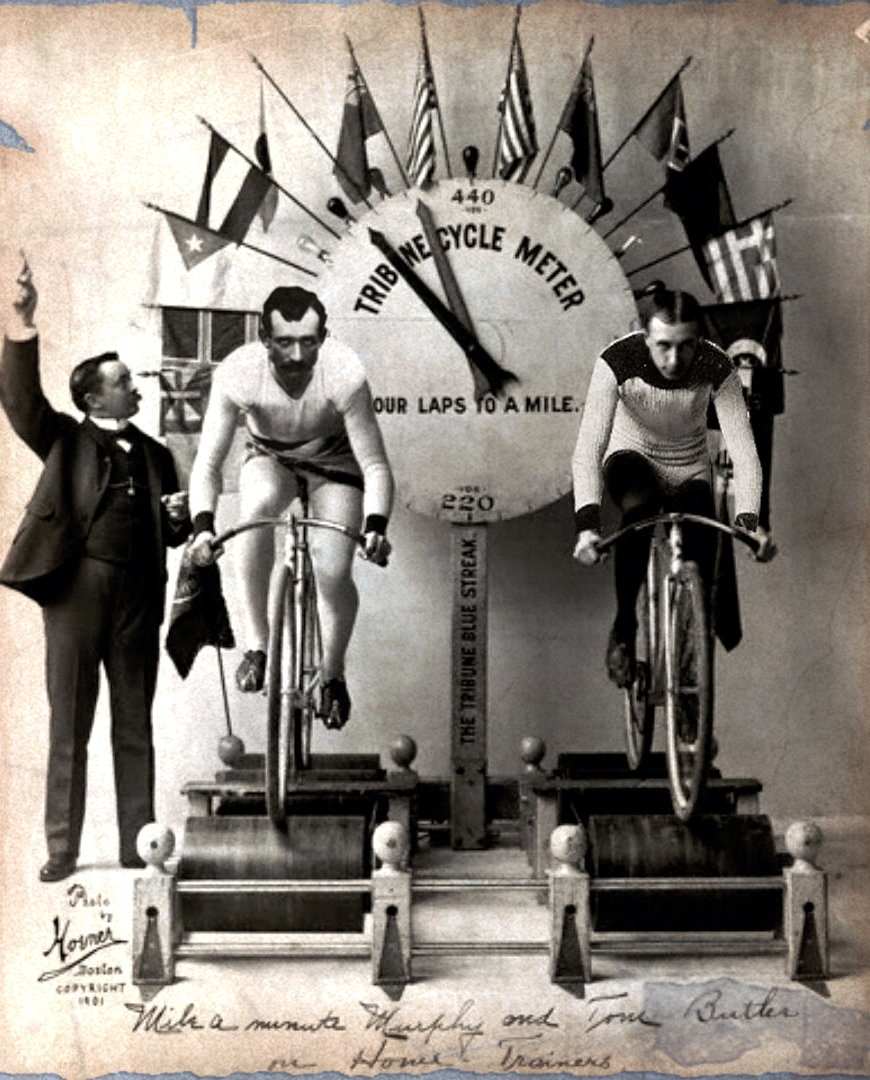
Early examples of indoor cycling on rollers

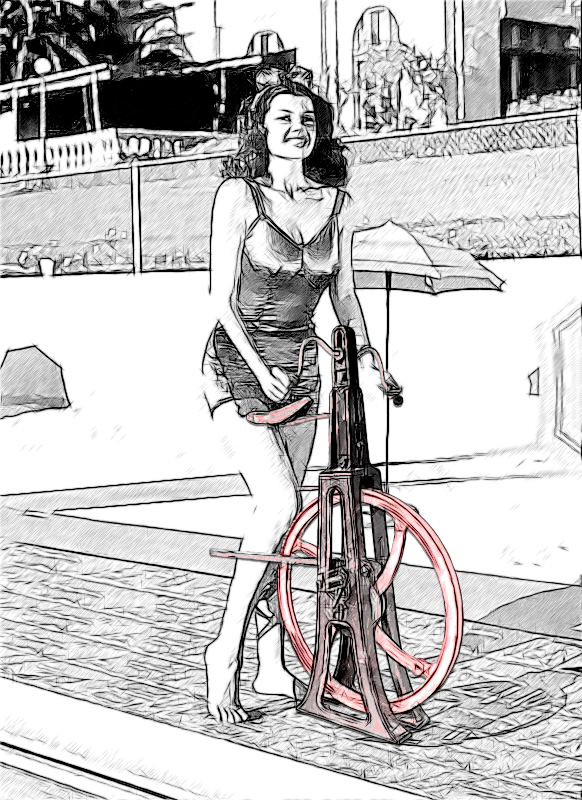
Stationary bicycle trainer

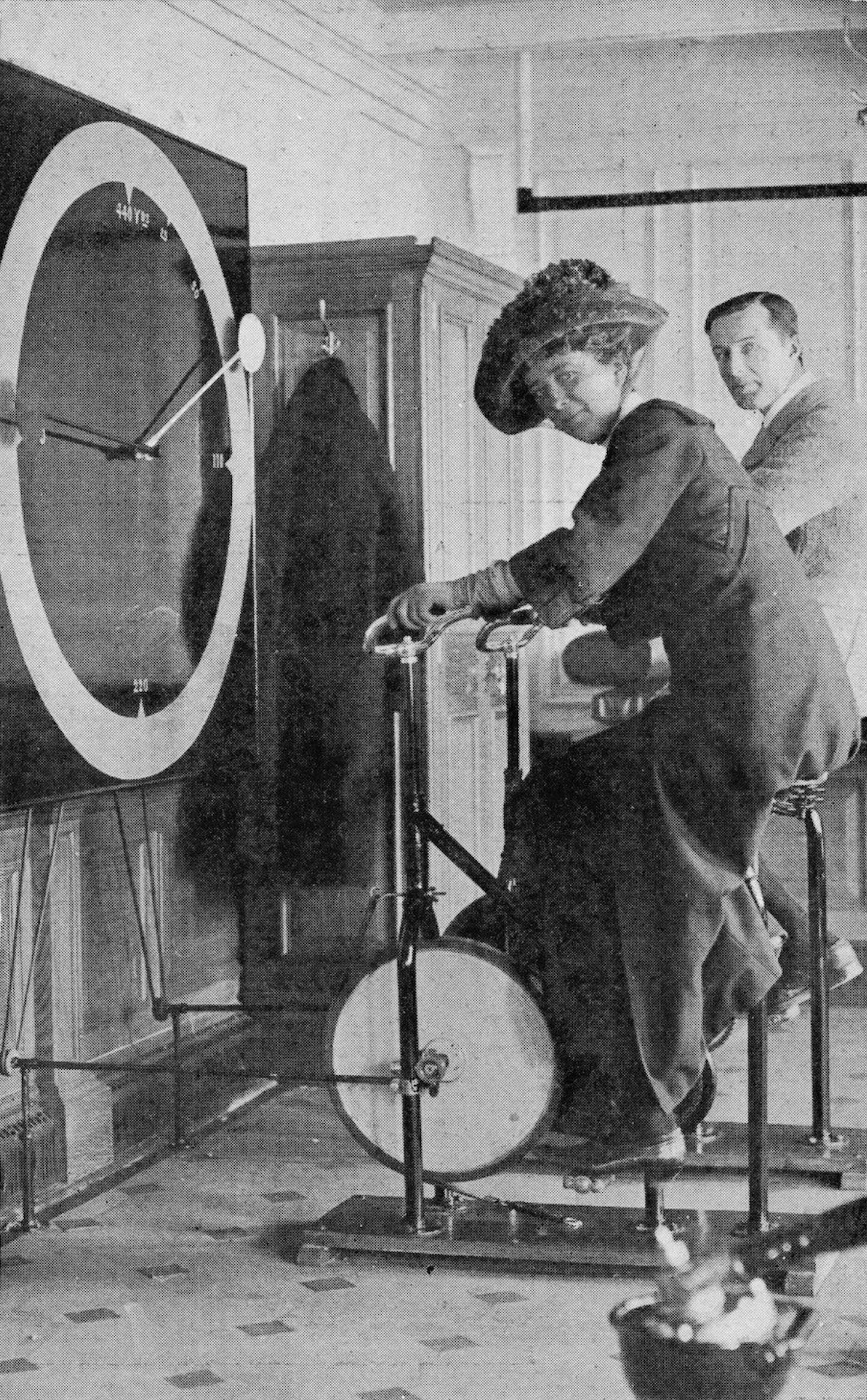
Lawrence Beesley at right in the Gymnastics Room of the Titanic, 1912

== See also ==
- Outline of cycling
- Bicycle trainer
- Bicycle messenger
