= MyWhoosh =

Virtual Cycling Platform

- Type: Private
- Traded as: Computer Systems and Software Designing
- Industry: Fitness, Gaming
- Founded: 2019; 7 years ago Abu Dhabi.
- Headquarters: Masdar City, Abu Dhabi, UAE
- Products: Virtual Gaming, Computer Systems and Software Designing
- Number of employees: (100+)
- Website: mywhoosh.com

MyWhoosh is massively multiplayer online indoor exercise software that enables users to interact, train, and compete across cycling, running and rowing disciplines in various virtual worlds, using indoor exercise equipment.

It was founded in 2019 as a virtual cycling platform. As of November 2023, MyWhoosh has over 730 workouts, in addition to structured training plans, group rides, races, and other riding formats across various virtual worlds, such as Arabia, Colombia, Australia, California, and Belgium.

== History ==
MyWhoosh was founded in 2019 by Akhtar Saeed Hashmi. Since its founding, MyWhoosh has hosted many live online events, including the weekly Sunday Race Club series, with reported monthly prize pools of over $90,000 or $284,000 USD split across both genders and levels of racers, with a total of over US$3.75 million paid out in 2024.

In April 2023, MyWhoosh hosted a cycling esports event with a $1 million prize pool, reported as the largest in the history of cycling esports at the time.

It has been described as having a Esports focus compared to other virtual cycling platforms. The level of funding MyWhoosh provided in its various races was reported to allow cycling Esports to become a full-time career for some athletes.

In January 2026, MyWhoosh added rowing for users with indoor rowers.

== Sponsorships ==
MyWhoosh is also the official indoor cycling platform of the UAE Team Emirates WorldTour men's team, its rider, Tadej Pogačar, and the UAE Team ADQ WorldTour women's team. In 2022, professional cyclist Micheal Vink signed with UAE Team Emirates WorldTour men's team after being scouted from his racing on MyWhoosh.

=== Events ===
In 2023, MyWhoosh was granted the rights to organize the Esports World Championship by the Union Cycliste Internationale (UCI) for the next three years. It is also the platform host of the Supertri E World Triathlon Championship, whose inaugural 2025 indoor hybrid course combined a pool swim, a treadmill for running, and static bikes for the cycling portion.

In 2022 MyWhoosh partnered with World Triathlon to become a Global Partner for 2022 Championship Finals in Abu Dhabi.

In January 2026, MyWhoosh became the lead cycling partner of Warner Bros. Discovery, receiving branding across Warner's European race coverage and collaborating on original content integrating virtual cycling technology into broadcasts. In February 2026, MyWhoosh partnered with cycling race organizer Flanders Classics to be present at their races throughout that year.

== Technology ==
MyWhoosh is built on Unreal Engine. It is available on mobile phones, tablets, laptops, computers and TV via iOS, Android, Windows, MacOS, and AppleTV. There is a companion app on iOS and Android, called "MyWhoosh Link".

Users can create and customize their virtual avatar, bike, scull, and clothing, and join various online events, such as races, group workouts, and group rides.

MyWhoosh's cycling workouts were reported to have been designed by UAE Team Emirates coach Kevin Poulton.

Users can communicate with other riders through text chat, form clubs or teams, and compete in various leagues.

MyWhoosh tracks and records various fitness metrics for the users, such as speed, power, heart rate, cadence, distance, calories burned, and time. Users can connect to external training apps such as Strava, TrainingPeaks, and TrainerDay, to sync their activities and data between these software.

=== Worlds ===
The virtual worlds available to users in MyWhoosh are based on both real-world and fictional locations. Locations include routes in:

- AlUla (an ancient Arabian oasis city and governorate in Saudi Arabia)
- Arabia (primarily based in Bahrain & UAE)
- Australia
- Belgium
- Bhutan
- California
- Colombia
- Endurance Climb
- Hudayriyat/Hudayriat Island
- Japan
- Montreal, Canada, based off a 2026 UCI Road World Championships route.
- MyWhoosh World
- Supertri (2025 Supertri E World Championships route)
- Switzerland
- UCI 2024
- UCI 2025 (Rwanda inspired routes from the 2025 UCI Road World Championships in Kigali)

==== Rowing ====
- Bled, (Lake Bled, Slovenia)

== See also ==
- Kinomap
- Rouvy
- Zwift
