= Kinomap =

Fitness training application

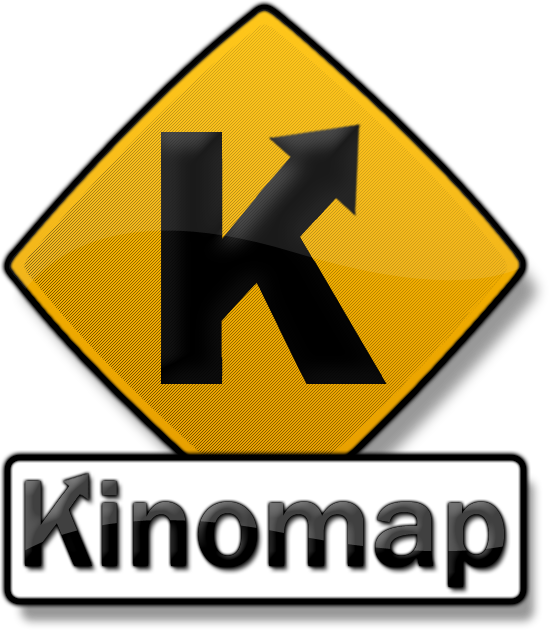
- Company type: Private company
- Website type: Geolocation-Video hosting service-Training app-Fitness app
- Available in: English, French, Chinese, Dutch, German, Italian, Japanese, Polish, Russian Spanish
- Headquarters: Douai, France
- Area served: Worldwide
- Founders: Laurent Desmons, Philippe Moity
- Website: kinomap.com
- Registration: 14-day trial, 12€ / month
- Current status: Active

Kinomap is an interactive training app for indoor cycling, rowing and running that enables individuals to find and share geolocated videos. The Kinomap platform is available in 15 languages, has 370,000 miles of geolocated routes and more than 40,000 training videos in over 195 countries worldwide.

During playback, a user may fast-forward the video to any desired point through video, map or graph. Navigation maps can be viewed in any one of several map formats including Google Map, Satellite, Terrain, Earth and OpenStreetMap (O.S.M.). A user may tag his points of Interest on the map, identified during the journey, set Hot Spots, add notes or comments and specify a travel mode (pedestrian, car, bus, train, aircraft etc.).

== Partnerships and awards ==
Kinomap has partnerships with Pôle Régional Numérique, Nord-Pas-De-Calais Region and is one of the supporters of Bik'Earth project.

Kinomap won the ANT+ Innovator Prize, the "Orange Innovation Prize" and is a member of the Ant+ Alliance. Also, the application Kinomap Trainer has won awards like Macworld Editor's Choice, Cycling Plus magazine App of the Month etc. and has featured in a number of magazines like Apps Magazine, Mobile Choice etc.

== See also ==
- Geolocation
- User generated content
- MyWhoosh
- Zwift
- Rouvy

S.No.	Wikipedia article	Kinomap video referenced in the article
1	Prix d'Amérique	2009 edition second by second video and winner position with Meaulnes du Corta
2	Los Gatos Creek Trail	Los Gatos Creek Trail entire path in video+map
3	South Kaibab Trail	South Kaibab Trail (Trailhead to Cedar Ridge)
4	Melbourne Grand Prix Circuit and Australian Grand Prix	Melbourne Formula 1 Grand Prix, Kimi Räikkönen in 2007
5	Infinite Loop (street) and Apple Campus	Cycling the Infinite Loop with interactive map
6	Mulholland Drive	Mulholland Drive filmed with an on-board camera displayed on a map
7	Lombard Street (San Francisco)	Down Lombard Street view in Video with interactive map
8	Googleplex	Biking around Googleplex
9	Paradise Valley, Arizona	15 minutes drive in the streets of Paradise Valley AZ with video and interactive map
10	Mandalay Bay Tram	The full journey in video with an interactive map
11	Circuit de Spa-Francorchamps	One lap at Spa Classic 2011
12	Nürburgring	One full Nordschleife lap with an on-board camera
