= Bicycle rollers =

Type of bicycle trainer

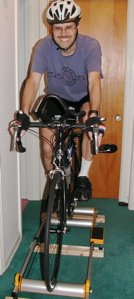
A person on a bicycle on bicycle rollers.

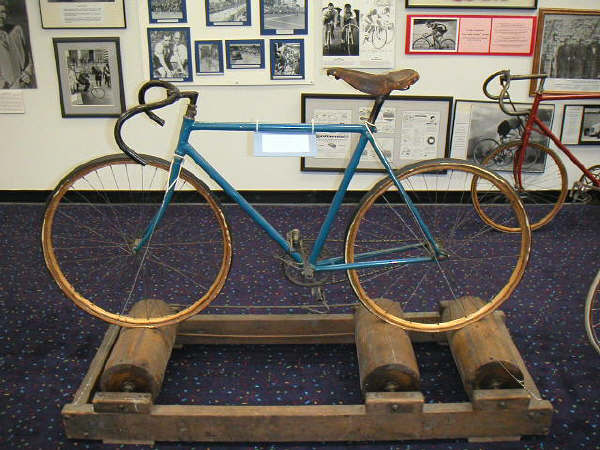
Antique rollers in the United States Bicycling Hall of Fame.

Bicycle rollers are a type of bicycle trainer that make it possible to ride a bicycle indoors without moving forward. However, unlike other types of bicycle trainers, rollers do not attach to the bicycle frame, and the rider must maintain balance on the rollers while training. Bicycle rollers normally consist of three cylinders, drums, or "rollers" (two for the rear wheel and one for the front), on top of which the bicycle rides. A belt connects the middle roller to the front roller, causing the front wheel of the bicycle to spin when the bicycle is pedaled. The spacing of bicycle rollers can usually be adjusted to match the bicycle's wheelbase. Generally, the front roller is adjusted to be slightly ahead of the hub of the front wheel.

== History ==
Bicycle rollers are nearly as old as the bicycle itself. Mile-a-minute Murphy is pictured riding on them as early as 1901.

== Riding on rollers ==
Balancing the bicycle without riding off the rollers is an extra challenge for the rider and requires much more balance and attention than bicycle trainers. Some cyclists find that this increased attention to balance enhances their workout, while other cyclists simply prefer the more stable trainers. Rollers are also used by bicycle racers to finely tune their balance, a skill needed for drafting and the close quarters of a peloton during races.

Novice cyclists often start by placing the bicycle rollers in a hallway or door frame where there is a nearby wall for support in the case of a fall. Removing any sharp and dangerous objects from the area is a must and a helmet is often worn, even though the user might be indoors. Beginners quickly discover that it is easier to maintain one's balance by focusing on a point a few yards ahead rather than looking directly down at the front wheel. In addition, it is easier to stay on the rollers in a higher gear when the wheels are spinning faster. Also, the user has no forward momentum while on bicycle rollers, which drastically reduces the possibility of injury in the event of a loss of balance or a fall.

== Construction ==
=== Rollers ===
The rollers themselves may be made from wood, aluminum alloy, or plastic. Aluminum alloy is usually a better choice because plastic rollers tend to bend and become misshapen from their regular cylindrical shape after use. Some rollers also have a concave cylinder shape (parabolic) to help keep the rider in the center of the rollers.

=== Frame ===
The frame may be made from welded steel or extruded aluminum. The frame may fold in the middle for storage or transport.

== Variations ==
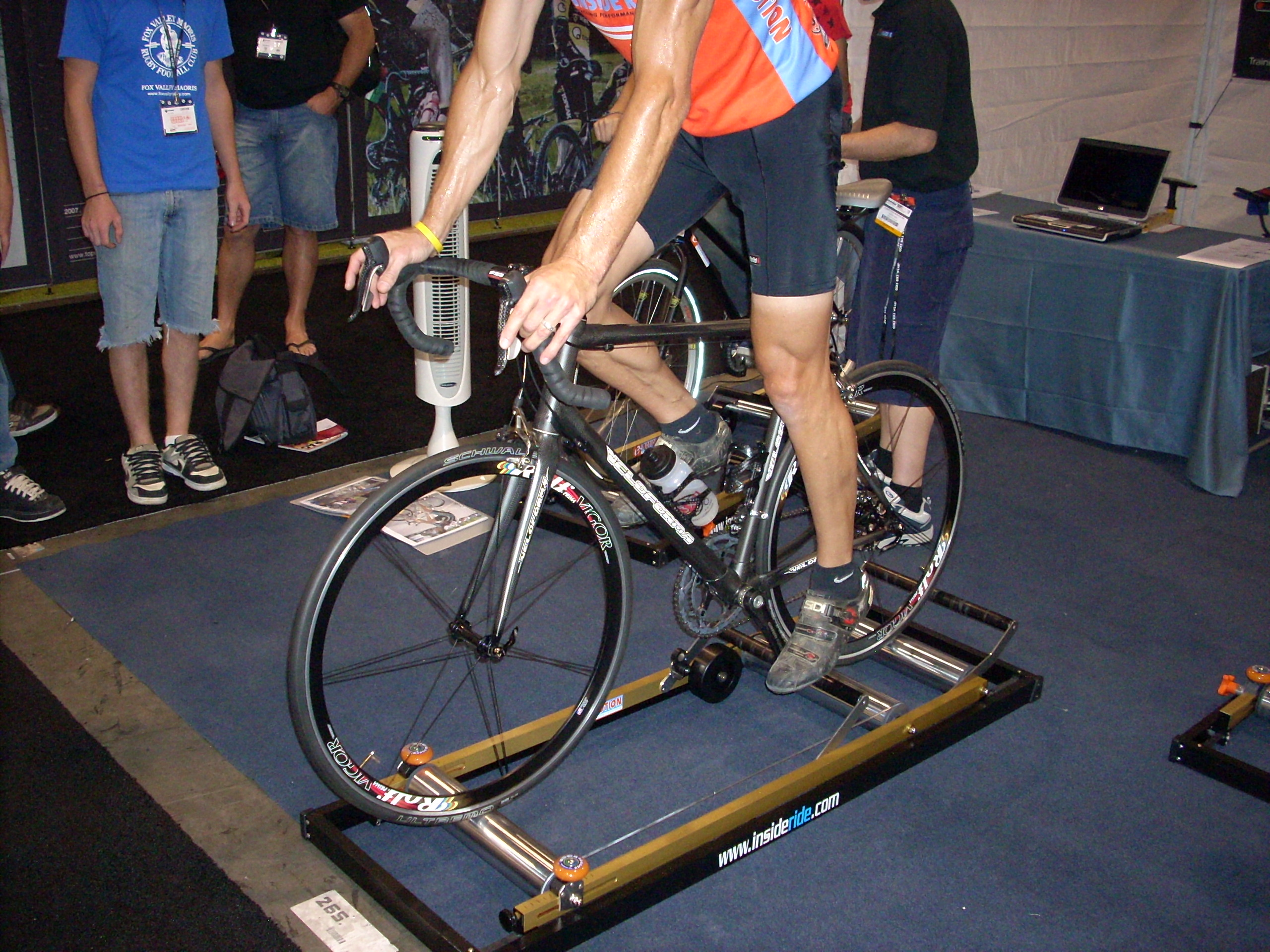
A flexible roller system allowing longitudinal movement.

Rollers are available in different widths (from 250 to 460 mm (10 to 18 in)) and diameters (from 57 to 114 mm (2.25 to 4.5 in) for higher resistance). Some bicycle rollers use two front drums or cylinders instead of just one.

Resistance may be added by having the spinning rollers driving some additional mechanism such as a fan. Some rollers have an internal flywheel on the back cylinder. This mimics real-world resistance to continuous acceleration and makes it possible to coast for up to 30 seconds.

It is possible to remove the front wheel and mount the front fork in a stand (usually sold separately) to duplicate the stability of other bicycle trainers.

Some rollers place the roller frame inside an external track so they can move (slide) fore and aft - which allow for simulating extreme pedalling off the saddle, as if climbing a hill. Strong elastic bands or springs are attached to each corner of the frame and pull and hold the roller frame in the tracks. A bicycle on the road can move fore and aft relative to the rider, and these rollers attempt to duplicate this effect.

== Roller racing ==
Rollers may also be used for roller races (or goldsprints if fork stands are used). Two or more bikes are placed on rollers side by side, with the rollers connected to a timing system. Timing systems either use modern electronics and digital projection, or a large analog clock with a hand for every rider representing their distance traveled. Roller racing was popular in 1950s Britain, often preceding films at the cinema or taking place in between dances at dance halls. The British Schools Cycling Association carries on the tradition of true roller racing without fork stands and maintains the BSCA National Competition Roller Records

In 1993, the Century Road Club Association of New York City retired their vintage rollers and mechanical dial for Kreitler Rollers and a computer system that could clock up to six racers at a time. Elsewhere in America, every winter a USA Cycling sanctioned event called the Iowa Roller Race Series defines roller racing champions. The series uses Kreitler Rollers and a DOS program Roller Fusion, which was commissioned in the 1990s by the late Al Kreitler. In honor of Al Kreitler, the promoter of the Iowa Roller Race Series, Greg Harper, organized the 2011 Al Kreitler Memorial Killer 2-Mile Roller Races. (To clarify, Al Kreitler was not killed; his dog was named "Killer.")

== See also ==
- Bicycle tires for indoor use
- Bicycle trainer
- Exercise bicycle
- Outline of cycling
- Goldsprint
