= Boaz Kaizman =

Israeli painter

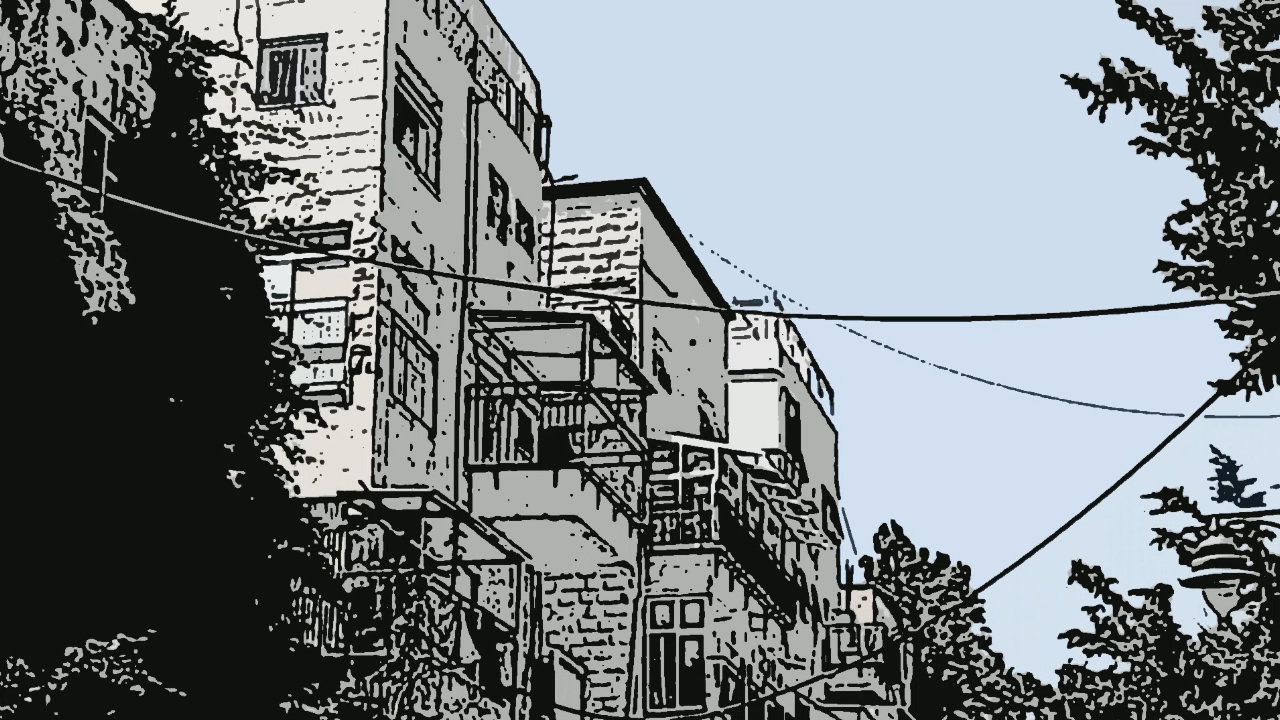
Still from the video work Hannah Arendt – the Journey to Jerusalem (2018) by Boaz Kaizman

Boaz Kaizman (* 1962 in Tel Aviv, Israel) is an Israeli artist. He has been living and working in Cologne since 1993.

== Biography ==
Kaizman studied in Tel Aviv and later moved to Germany. He has been living and working in Cologne since 1993.

In 2018, the film Tigersprung by Kaizman, Peter Rosenthal and Marcus Seibert premiered. In the style of a graphic novel documentary film, it reenacts the visits of the Jewish cycling manager Ernst Berliner in Cologne. The actor Jörg Ratjen gave Berliner a voice. Berliner's great-grandson, Sam Alter, was involved in the preparations for the film and came to Cologne from the US for this purpose. In October 2018 the film was awarded the Golden Crank of the International Cycling Film Festival in Herne.

From 3 September 2021 to 16 January 2022, Kaizman's video installation Green Area was shown at the Cologne Museum Ludwig.

== Exhibitions (selection) ==
=== Solo exhibitions ===
- 2021–2022: Boaz Kaizman: Grünanlage / Green Area, Museum Ludwig, Cologne (3 September 2021 – 16 January 2022).
- 2009: Esperanto, artothek, Cologne.
- 2009: Buchbinder (video), premiere at Galerie Mirko Mayer, Cologne.
- 2004: Maalesh (video, 22 min.), premiere at the Off Broadway cinema, Cologne (28 October 2004, during Art Cologne).

=== Group exhibitions ===
- 2023–2025: On the Value of Time. New presentation of the contemporary art collection, Museum Ludwig, Cologne (10 August 2023 – 31 August 2025).
- 2021: Living Together — Crossing Borders (The 4th Mediterranean Biennale), Haifa / Sakhnin Valley (Apr.–Oct. 2021).
- 2018–2019: büro komplex – the art of the artothek in political space, Kunsthaus NRW Kornelimünster, Aachen (27 October 2018 – 28 April 2019).
- 2010: Images in Motion: Artists & Video/Film, Museum Ludwig, Cologne (29 May 2010 – 31 October 2010).

=== Projects / Online exhibitions (selection) ===
- since 2012: 71Gedichte (online exhibition project; hybrid among others 2012 in Cologne).
- since 1 December 2022: dringlicher Appell (online project).
- 2019: Die Anzeige (among others Bunker K101, Cologne; additionally online project).
- 2024: Mapping The Studio 64bit. Future-Proof Video Art and Digital Presentation (hybrid/online project; launch event 29 August 2024).

== Literature (selection) ==
- Barbara Engelbach, ed. (2021), Boaz Kaizman. Grünanlage / Green Area. Exhib. cat. Museum Ludwig, Cologne, 2021, Cologne: Verlag der Buchhandlung Walther und Franz König, ISBN 978-3-7533-0121-1
- Boaz Kaizman: Hannah Arendt – the Journey to Jerusalem, Thoughts on the video work. In: Andreas Kilcher (ed.): Text and Image in Jewish Literature. The Emergence of the Image in Writing (Yearbook for European Jewish Literature Studies, vol. 7). Berlin/Boston: Walter de Gruyter, 2020, pp. 172–177.
- Marcel Schumacher, ed. (2018), büro komplex: die Kunst der Artothek im politischen Raum, Berlin: Braus, ISBN 978-3-86228-186-2
- Barbara Engelbach, ed. (2010), Images in Motion - Artists & Video, Film 1958 - 2010: ... on the occasion of the exhibition "Images in Motion: Artists & Video, Film", Museum Ludwig Cologne, 29.05. - 31.10.2010, Cologne: Museum Ludwig Cologne, ISBN 978-3-86560-837-6
- Mirko Mayer (ed.): Boaz Kaizman: Access. Frankfurt am Main: Revolver – Archiv für aktuelle Kunst, 2005.
- Hans Günter Golinski; Sepp Hiekisch-Picard (eds.): The Right of the Image. Jewish Perspectives in Modern Art. Exhibition catalogue, Museum Bochum (21 September 2003 – 4 January 2004). Heidelberg: Edition Braus, 2003, ISBN 978-3-89904-076-0.
