= Charles Minthorn Murphy =

American cyclist

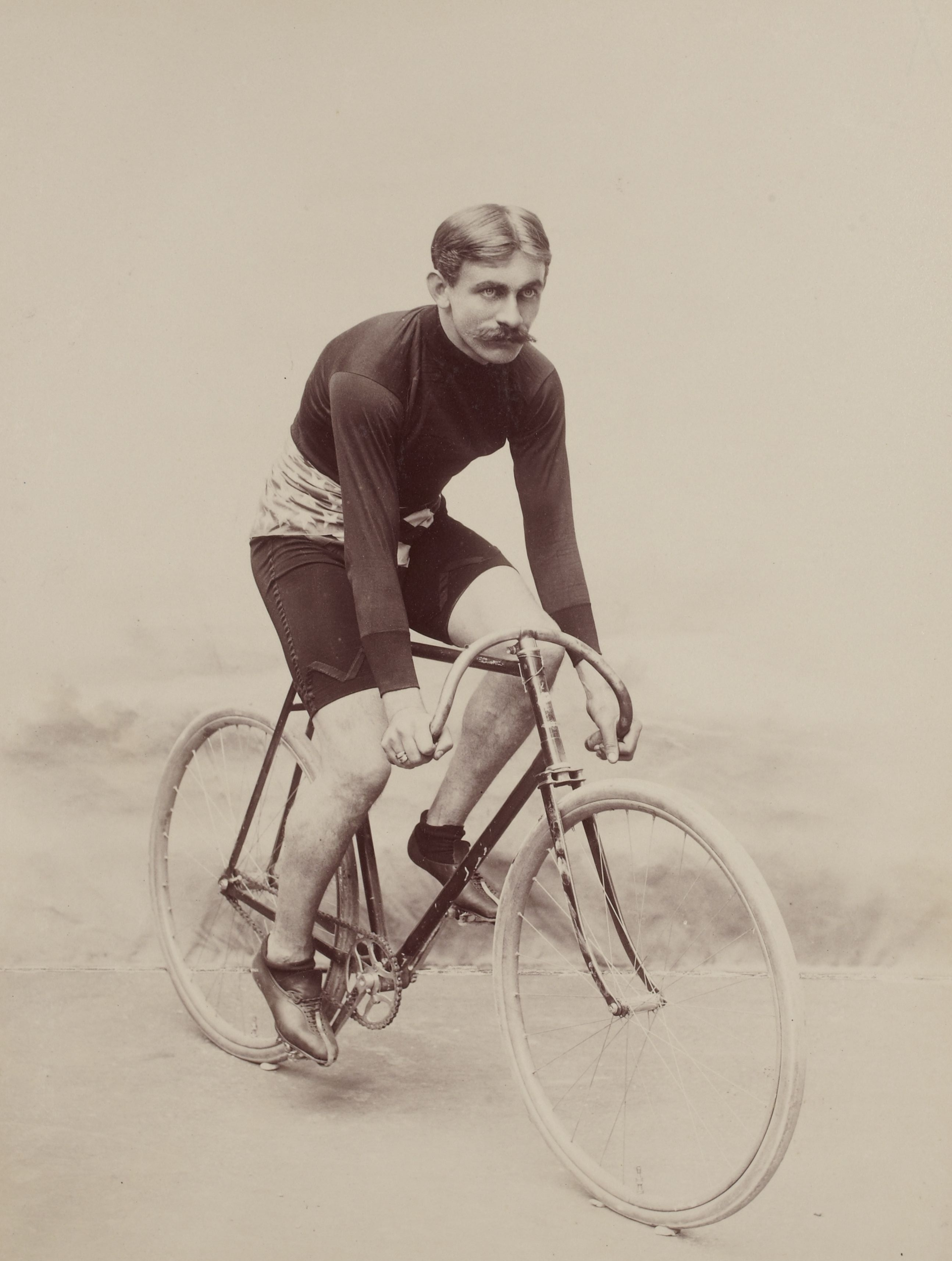
Murphy in 1896

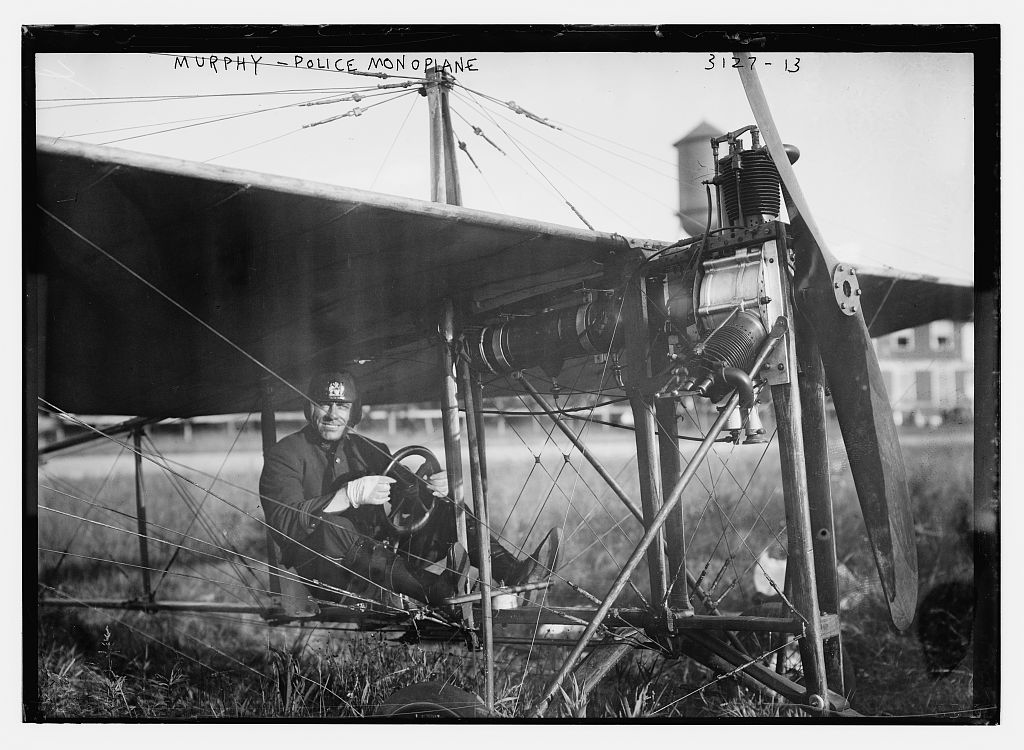
Charles Minthorn Murphy in the New York City police monoplane in 1914

Charles Minthorn Murphy (October 1870 – February 16, 1950), also known as Mile-a-Minute Murphy, was an American cycling athlete. He was the first person ever to ride a bicycle for one mile in less than a minute. He performed this feat in 1899 by drafting behind a Long Island Rail Road (LIRR) passenger car along the LIRR's Central Branch between Farmingdale and Babylon on Long Island.

== Biography ==
He was born in October 1870 to Eliza G. and Martin J. Murphy. On May 27, 1891, he married Elizabeth E. "Libbie" Puhl in Brooklyn. After the death of the latter in 1922, Murphy then married Catherine Kissel.

=== Mile-a-Minute ride ===
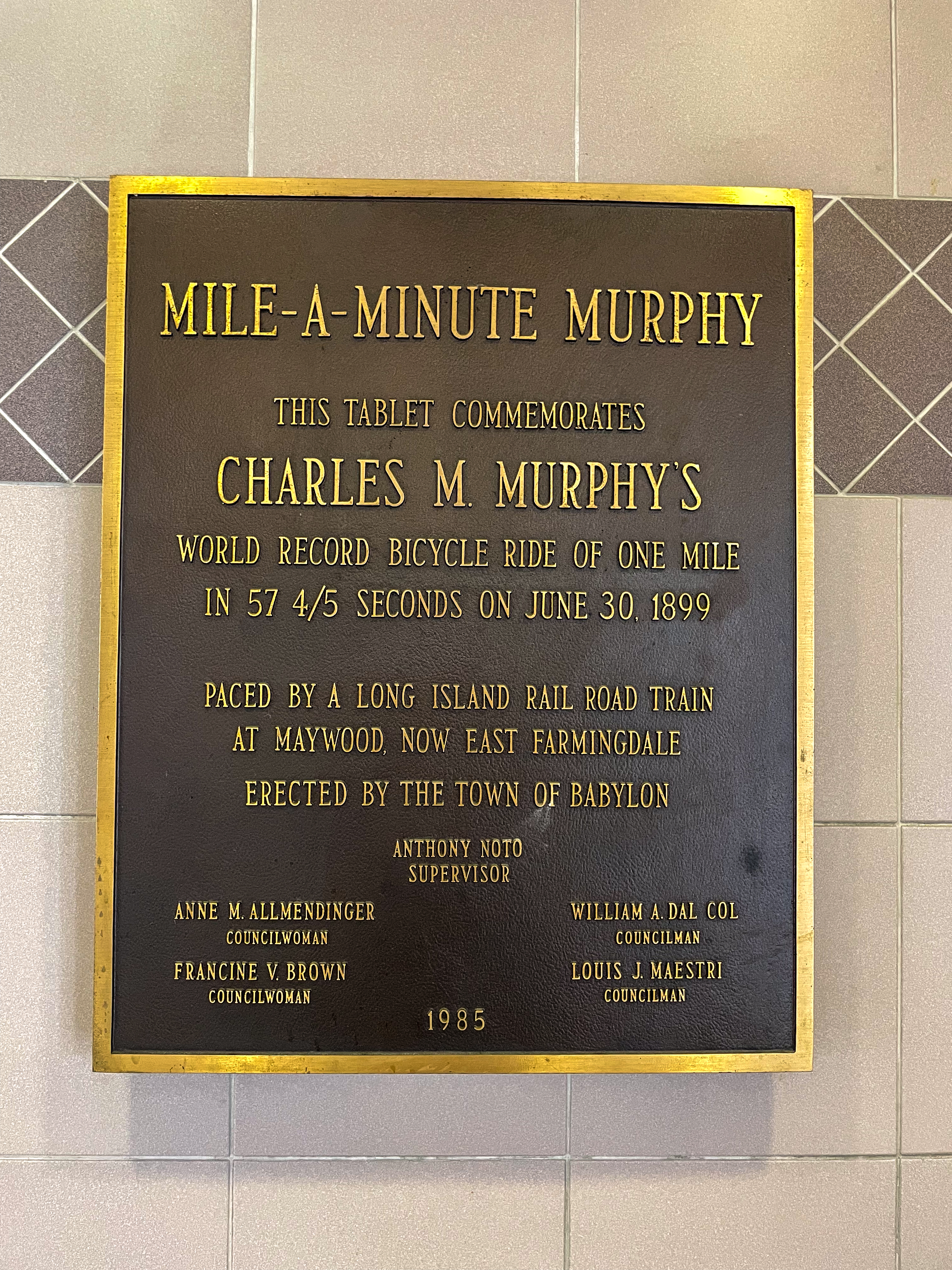
Plaque at Babylon station, LIRR

Murphy persuaded a railway company to board in two miles of track and run a train so he could ride a mile in a minute in its slipstream. It took him 57.8 seconds. He said in the Farmingdale Post that the idea came to him after an argument with friends at his home in Brooklyn, New York. "I was asked to give an opinion of the quality and relative speed of various prominent riders of the time", Murphy recalled. "My answer was that there is no limit to the speed of a bicycle rider, that speed depended largely upon the bicycle, gears, tracks and pacemaker. I declared there was not a locomotive built which could get away from me. The more people laughed, the more determined I became to accomplish the feat. I figured that the fast-moving locomotive would expel the air to such an extent that I could follow in the vacuum behind."

Murphy had ridden a mile in 37 seconds on static rollers and so, with a big enough shield, he said, he could go as fast as he liked.

"By chance," he said, "I met Hal Fullerton, special agent of the Long Island Rail Road at Howes Roadhouse. I pointed out that an exhibition of that kind would prove to the world that the Long Island Railroad had just as good rolling stock, roadbeds and employees as any other road in the world." The contract was signed within 48 hours. James Edward Sullivan, secretary of the American athletics union, was referee and there were five timekeepers. The party arrived in Babylon, New York, at 5:00 pm on June 21, 1899, mounted the train and watched.

Fullerton had spread a two-mile carpet of boards from Babylon to Farmingdale and built 11-foot side-wings and a small roof to the platform on the last carriage. Murphy told Sam Booth, driver of locomotive 39, to go as fast as he could. Murphy clocked 16.4 seconds for the first quarter-mile, 33.6 for the half, 49.2 for the three-quarters and the mile in 1:08.

Fullerton was embarrassed that his locomotive failed to get to 60 mph. Its weight made the wooden track sink and rise and Murphy was forced to ride a wave. On the final, successful run, Murphy held the pacing compartment until he'd got his bicycle rolling and Fullerton told Sam Booth, the driver, to open the regulator.

"With eyes glued upon the vertical strip of white on back of the car… I experienced an entirely different feeling compared with my previous ride", Murphy recalled. "The officials knew that there was something wrong, that I was labouring under great difficulties. I could not understand the violent vibration in the track, as though I was riding over an undulation instead of level track; feeling hot missiles striking my face and body. I learned afterwards it was burning rubber from under the car.

"Within five seconds the rate of speed was terrific; I was riding in a maelstrom of swirling dust, hot cinders, paper and other particles of matter. The whipsaw feeling through a veritable storm of fire became harder every second. I could feel myself getting weaker every second I saw ridicule, contempt, disgrace and a lifetime dream gone up in smoke. I saw the agonised faces, yelling, holding out stretched hands as if they would like to get hold of or assist me somehow."

The half-mile passed in 29.4 seconds.

"Wobbling to and fro, but still gaining, the dust, the odour of burning rubber… The car was crowded with men who had been used to seeing any and all things that were dangerous, but the howling and screaming of sturdy officials and newspaper men from all over the United States that stood on the platform put all on edge. Suddenly, three-quarters was passed in 43 4/5 seconds. I expected to go off the track, travelling faster than the train, with the terrible storm of dust, pebbles, hot rubber and cinders. I looked up blankly. It was getting to a point where I could expect anything."

Finally he saw the waving Stars and Stripes that marked the finish. He was at that point 15 feet behind the train, having struggled to stay with it. By then, however, he was closing the gap and therefore riding faster than the train. Sam Booth shut off steam. Murphy crashed into the train. The bike tipped up and Murphy let go and grabbed an upright bar. Fullerton caught one arm and a man called Joseph H. Cummin the other and they pulled both bike and rider to the platform.

"I lay motionless, face down, on the platform. I was all in. I was half-carried to a cot at the end of the car; the roar of the train was challenged by hysterical yells. Grown men hugged and kissed each other. One man fainted and another went into hysterics, while I remained speechless on my back, ashen in colour and sore all over," Murphy said.

Booth, the driver, was worried. He'd seen Murphy drop back on the first ride and had looked for him to do the same on the second. Seconds after shutting off steam he reached the end of the racing track and thought Murphy had piled into unprotected ties (UK: sleepers) between the rails. Seeing him being treated for burns from flying cinders, he thought he was dead.

James Edward Sullivan, the referee, said he would never again take part in such an event. Murphy, though, carried on racing. He was among 600 touring professionals on the Grand Circuit in the mid-1890s, won the American tandem championship in 1891 and American titles from one to five miles, setting 17 national records. In 1895 he claimed 7 world, 17 American and 29 state records.

== New York Police career ==
He went on tour in the Keith Vaudeville Circuit, then joined New York City Police Department. He was commended four times and cited five times. He boasted of being the first policeman in the world to fly an aeroplane, and the first in New York to ride a motorcycle in uniform. As a motorcycle policeman, he had three accidents, two of them serious. His first happened in 1914, which sidelined him for a while. The second occurred on September 19, 1915, when he hit a touring car in pursuit (he was thrown off his motorcycle and the touring car passed over his legs, but he wasn't seriously hurt). The final one happened on September 3, 1916, breaking a leg in three places after a collision with an automobile on Manhattan Bridge. That last accident forced him into retirement from the New York police department on January 29, 1917.

== Death ==
He died of complications to diabetes in Jamaica, Queens on February 17, 1950, aged 79. One leg had been amputated in 1948 from gangrene. He is interred at Green-Wood Cemetery in Brooklyn, New York.

== Honors and awards ==
The Farmingdale Post described him as "one of the men who added a bright spot of color to Farmingdale history." He was elected to the United States Bicycling Hall of Fame in 1991.

== See also ==
- Cycling records
