= International Cycling Film Festival =

Annual film festival

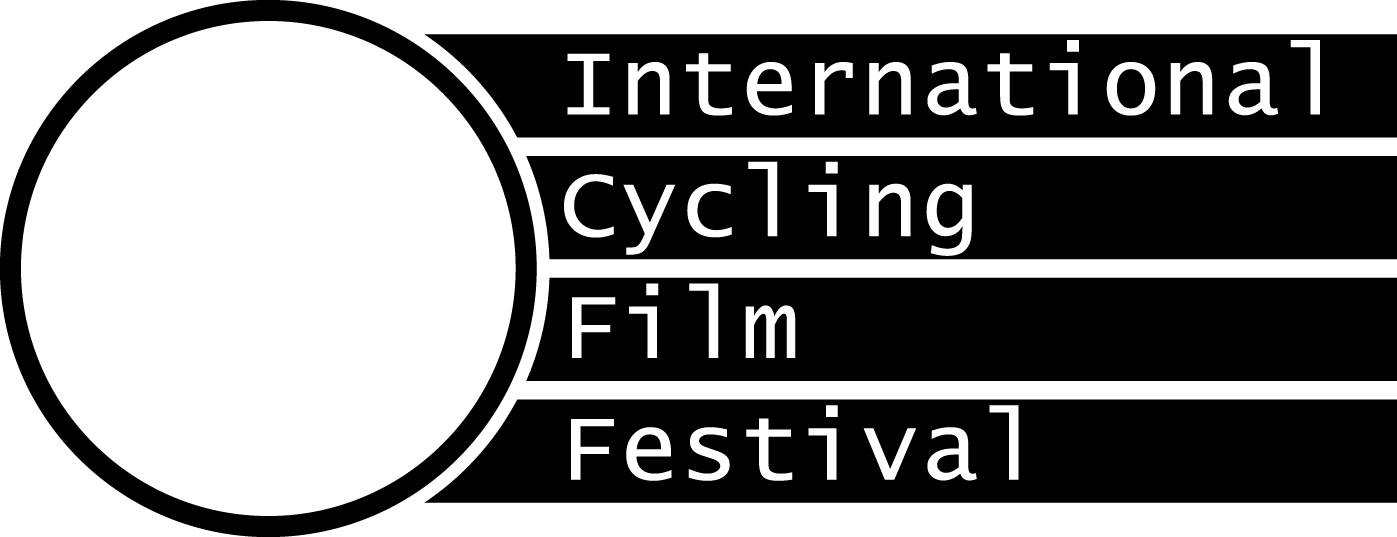
- Location: Katowice in Poland, Herne, Nuremberg and Wiesbaden in Germany, Ferizaj in Kosovo and Groningen in the Netherlands
- Founded: 2005 as International Cycling Video Festival -2009 renamed International Cycling Film Festival
- Awards: Goldene Kurbel, Grand Prize of the Jury, Souvenir Albert Richter and Audience Awards
- Hosted by: Europäisches Büro für Filmkunst und Fahrradkultur, Team Hollandse Frietjes - non-professional cycling, Bochum, Roomservice, Herne, Germany, and Silesia Film, Katowice, Poland
- No. of films: 12 films from 6 countries in main program at the 20th ICFF 2026
- Festival date: Herne: March 11 to March 13, 2027
- Website: http://www.cyclingfilms.de

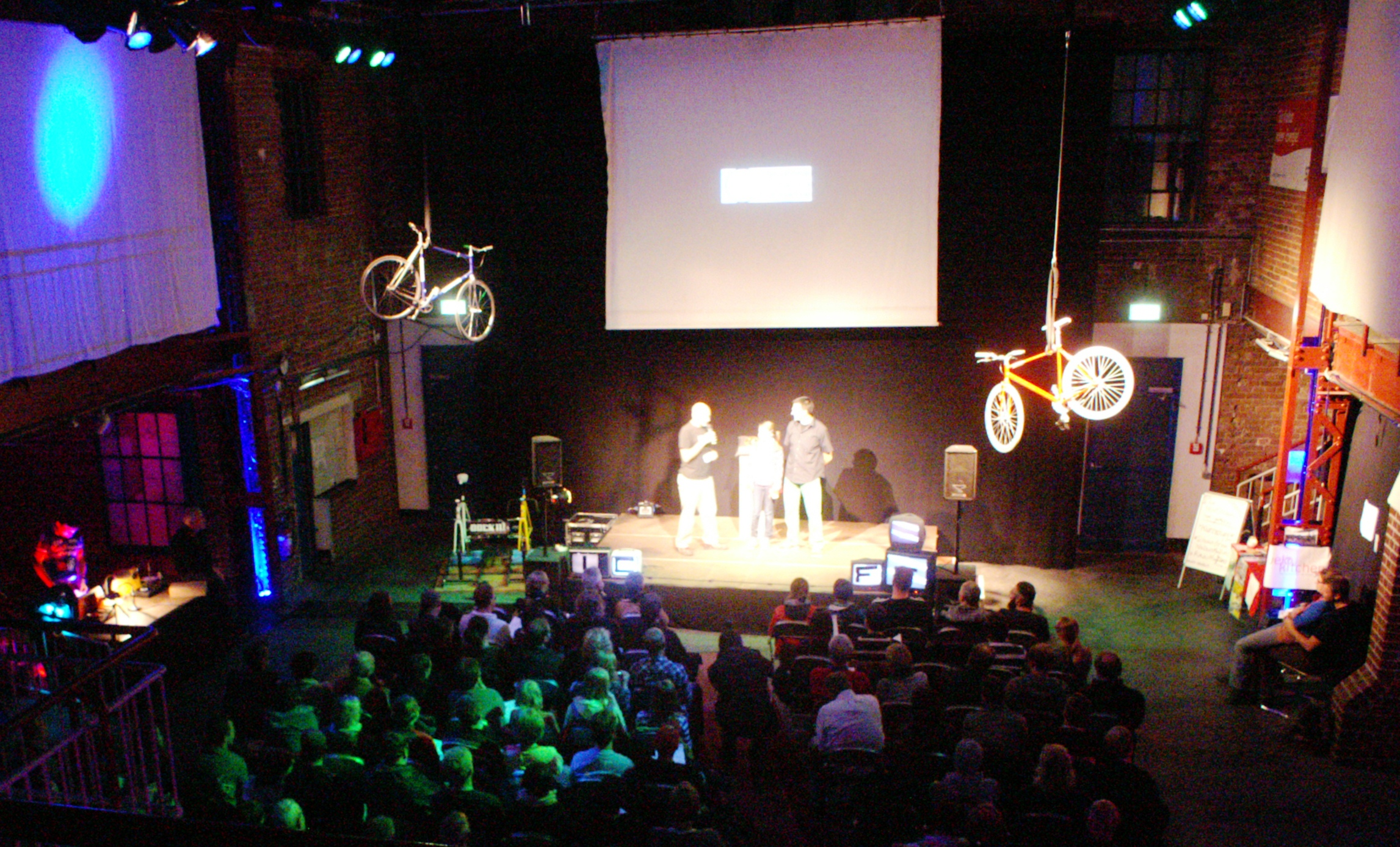
On stage interview with movie makers at the 7th ICFF 2012

The International Cycling Film Festival (Polish: Międzynarodowy Festiwal Filmów Rowerowych, German: Internationales Festival des Fahrrad-Films) is an independent, not-for-profit film festival held annually in Germany, in Poland, in Kosovo and in the Netherlands. Its mission is to strengthen international cooperation in the areas of art film and bicycle culture. The festival promotes interaction between movie makers and cyclists from all over the world. It has screened more than 350 short movies from more than 30 countries since its debut in 2006. Each year around 20 films compete for the award Goldene Kurbel and the awards of the audience. The Neistat Brothers, Flóra Anna Buda, Michaël Dudok de Wit, Andrea Dorfman, Tomer Shushan, Lucas Brunelle, Steven Subotnick, Nash Edgerton, M. A. Numminen and other filmmakers and artists contributed to the ICFF.

The most recent, 20th International Cycling Film Festival ran for three days and screened a total of 42 short and feature-length films for an audience of approximately 800 people. The festival's main program and the Golden Crank competition featured 12 short films from 6 countries.

== History ==
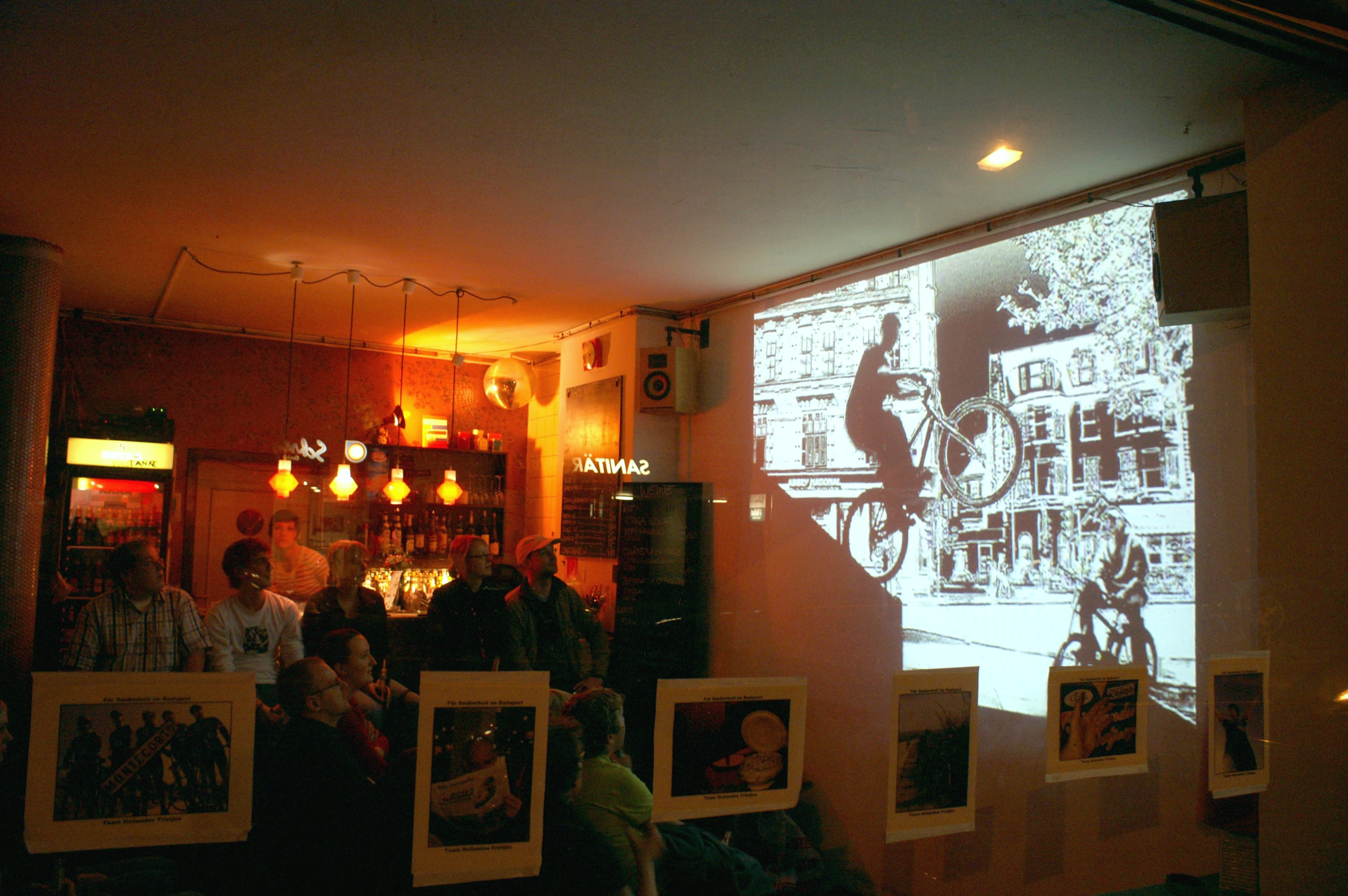
2006: The ICFF's launch in its former venue, the Club Goldkante in Bochum

=== Early years ===
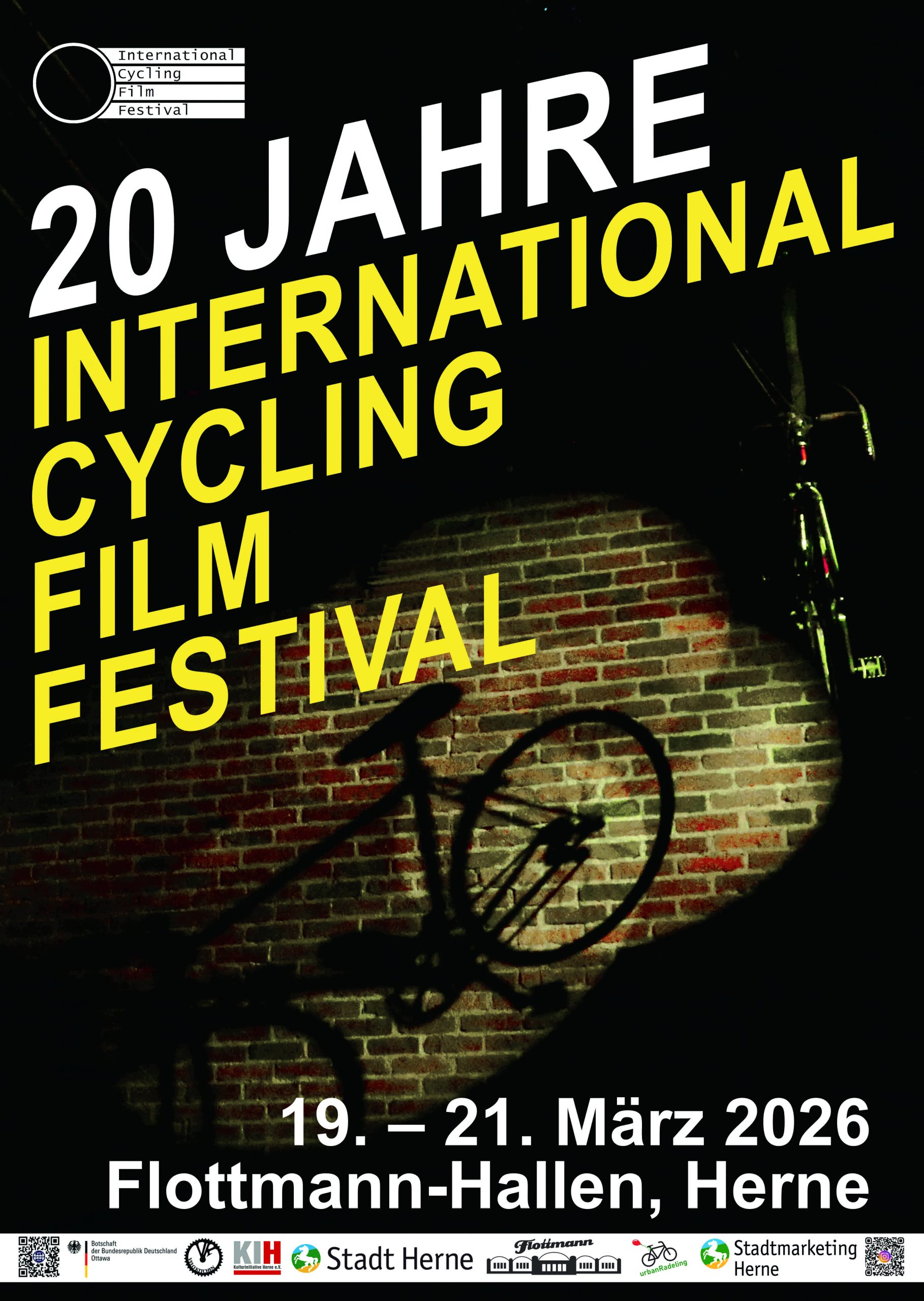
20th International Cycling Film Festival official poster

The International Cycling Film Festival was established in December 2005 in Bochum by the chairman of the cycling club Team Hollandse Frietjes – non-professional cycling, Gernot Mühge. The festival launched in September 2006 under the name "International Cycling Video Festival" (German: Internationales Festival des Radsport-Videos). Featured were 17 films from the US, Scotland, Switzerland, Austria and Germany. The first three festivals took place at “Goldkante”, a club for the local art scene and social-cultural events in Bochum. During these years the festival was arranged as a three-days festival, containing two film evenings at the first two days and ending with a time trial for both cyclists and movie makers at the third day. The laudatory for the Goldene Kurbel in these years was Frank Hörner, director of the Theater Kohlenpott, which is a children and youth theatre in the Flottmann-Hallen, Herne. He facilitated the transfer of the ICFF from Bochum to nearby Herne.

=== Flottmann-Hallen years ===
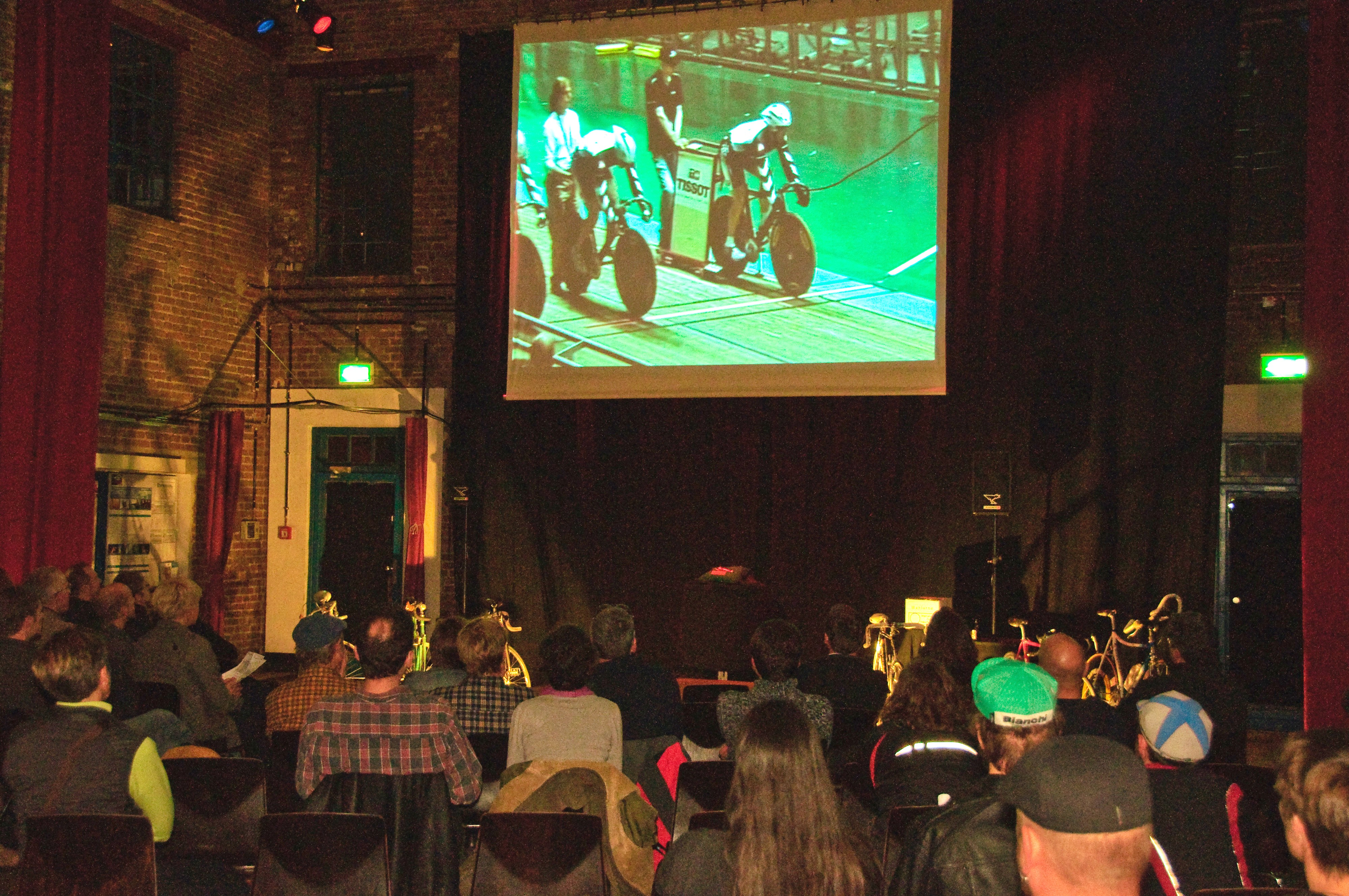
The Flottmann-Hallen is the venue of the ICFF since 2009

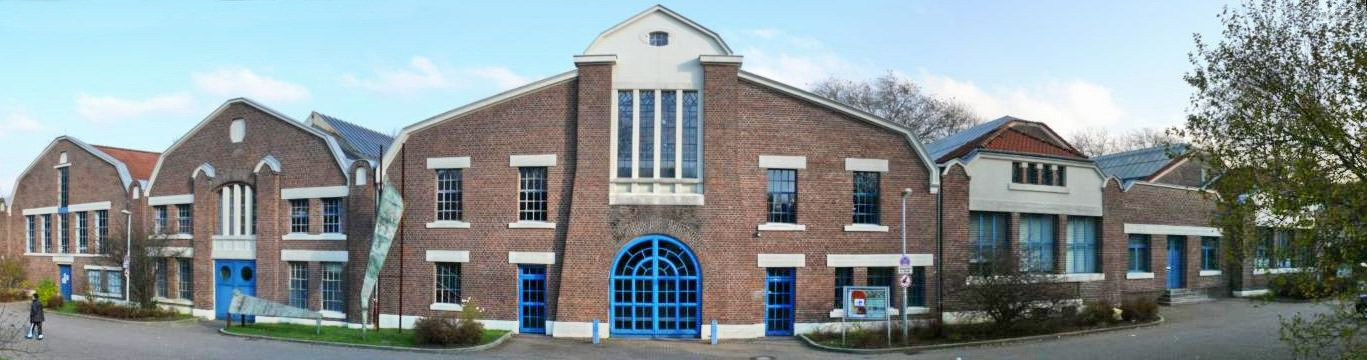
Flottmann-Hallen, exterior view

Since a continuous growth by an increasing number of participants and a rising variety and quality of film contributions the festival was renamed "International Cycling Film Festival” 2009. Also the festival's venue “Goldkante” became too small for the audience over the years. Based on the existing cooperation to the Theater Kohlenpott the makers of the festival decided to move the 4th International Cycling Film Festival to Herne 2009. From then until now the festival takes place at the Flottmann-Hallen, a former machine-tool factory, which was transformed into a cultural centre for Herne following its closure in 1983. During the years 2010 to 2012 the ICFF was included in the “VVicycle- Herne Film and Bicycle Days”, an organizational umbrella for different film festivals taking place in the Flottmann-Hallen.

“The fantastic bicycle film" (German: Der fantastische Fahrradfilm) was the particular motto of the 6th International Cycling Film Festival. The motto was repeated as "The fantastic bicycle film reloaded" during the 8th ICFF 2013. These two specific programs included anime, animation and auteur films from Argentina, Austria, Greece, Germany, Japan, Italy, Poland and Portugal.

=== Polish-German period of the ICFF ===
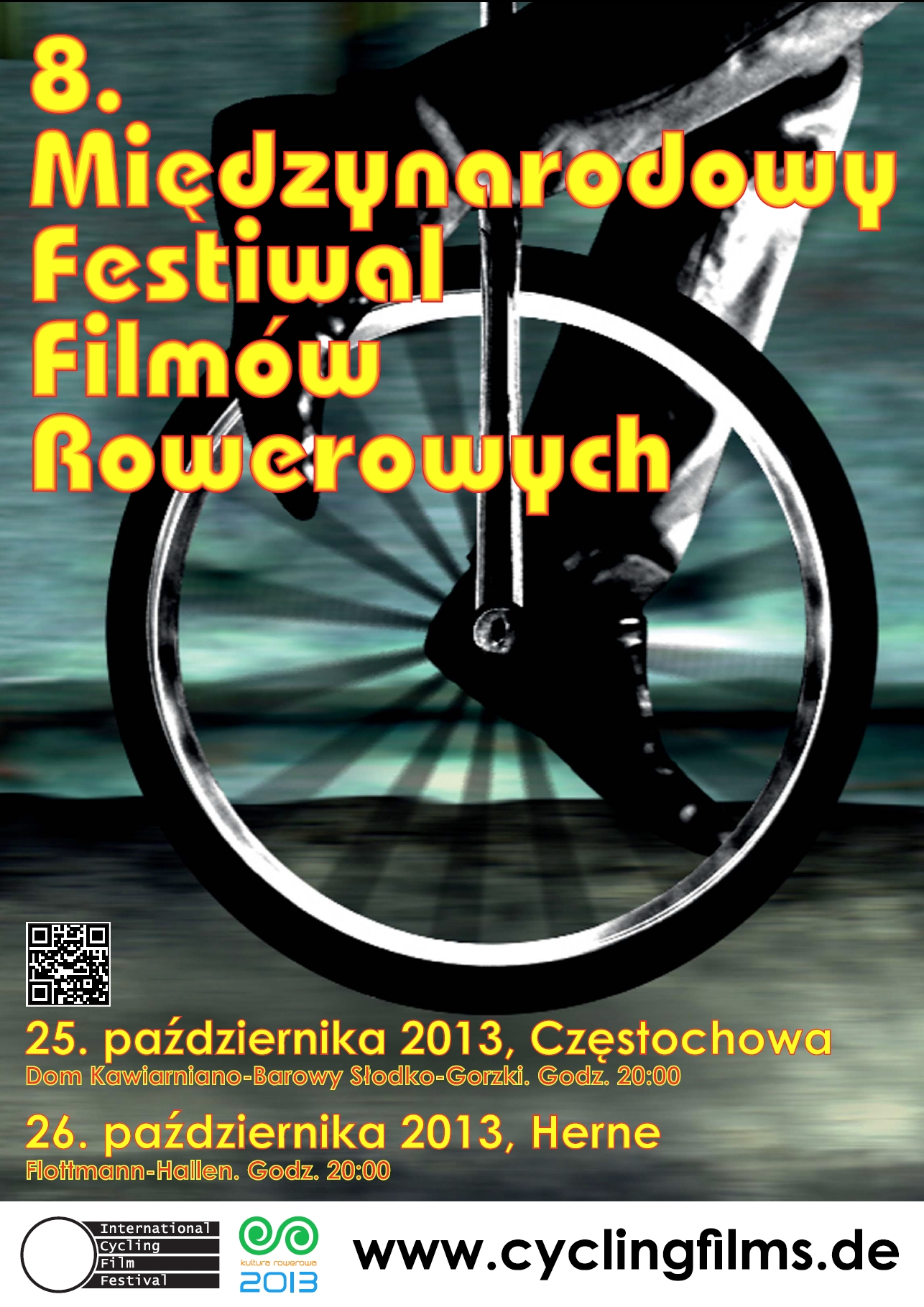
2013 Official festival poster, Polish version

In Summer 2011, during a meeting on future cooperation among bicycle activists in the Ruhr district held in the bike kitchen in Dortmund, Aleksander Kopia, founder of the Silesian Bicycle Initiative (Polish: Śląska Inicjatywa Rowerowa), Poland met people from the ICFF. From that point the Polish initiative is a partner of the ICFF. First guest performances in Poland occurred in the Silesian Voivodeship in Katowice and in Częstochowa in summer 2012. This gave rise to the idea of setting up a second ICFF in Poland based on equal partnership between the Polish and German makers of the ICFF. So 2013 the program of the festival was shown simultaneously in Herne and Częstochowa. Furthermore, a new prize for bicycle-related films was created. The award was named Trzy złote szprychy (English: Three Golden Spokes) and is the audience award of the festival's Polish edition. In 2014, the Polish edition of the ICFF moved from Częstochowa to Kraków. Since that time the ICFF is under the patronage of the German Consulate General in Kraków. The Polish festival edition is supported by the Goethe-Institut, a German cultural association encouraging international cultural exchange.

=== A Dutch-Polish-German film festival since 2015 ===
In 2014 the Dutch movie maker Erwin Zantinga from Groningen became a new member of the ICFF board after he presented his film “Two wheels and a hayfork” at the 9th ICFF in Herne personally. Due to this new cooperation between Dutch, Polish and German festival makers Groningen became an additional venue off the ICFF. In the same time the makers of the ICFF started collaboration with the party Alliance '90/The Greens of the municipality of Wiesbaden. As a result, the German Film Heritage Foundation Murnau Stiftung was found as the fifth fixed venue of the ICFF. It is now a trinational festival with board members from and fixed venues in Poland, the Netherlands and Germany.

With its further expansion also the approach of the festival was more and more outlined. Nowadays its mission is two-fold. First, the ICFF focuses on the bicycle as a subject of cinematic art. This part of the festival is represented by movie makers like Werther Germondari, Michaël Dudok de Wit, Jörn Staeger, or Michael Klöfkorn, who contributed to the festival. Second, the ICFF screens films as a means of expression in the fast growing bicycle culture. It is a forum for movie makers from the bicycle community like Lucas Brunelle or Casey Neistat.

== Award Goldene Kurbel ==
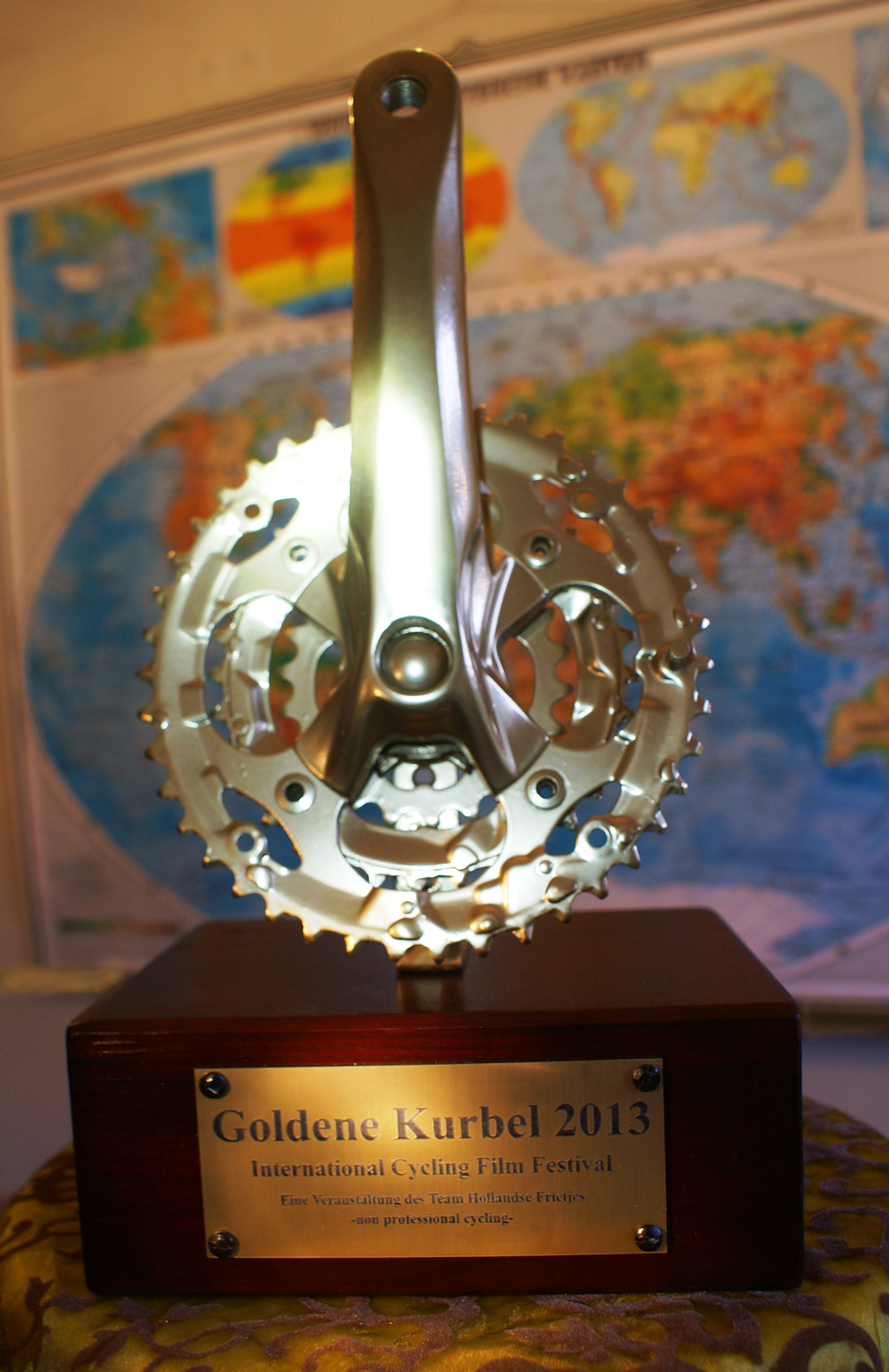
Goldene Kurbel 2013

The Goldene Kurbel (English: Golden Crank) is the highest prize awarded to the best film in the festival, counting as The Oscar for bicycle films. It is the oldest film prize for bicycle-related films. The award is chosen by a jury of local film, bicycle and art experts who are also in charge for the official selection of the festival program. The Goldene Kurbel consists of a golden right-side crank arm of a bicycle on the top of a wooden base. The crank stands as a symbol for the bicycle and refers also to the crank of early hand-cranked film cameras.

== Awardees ==
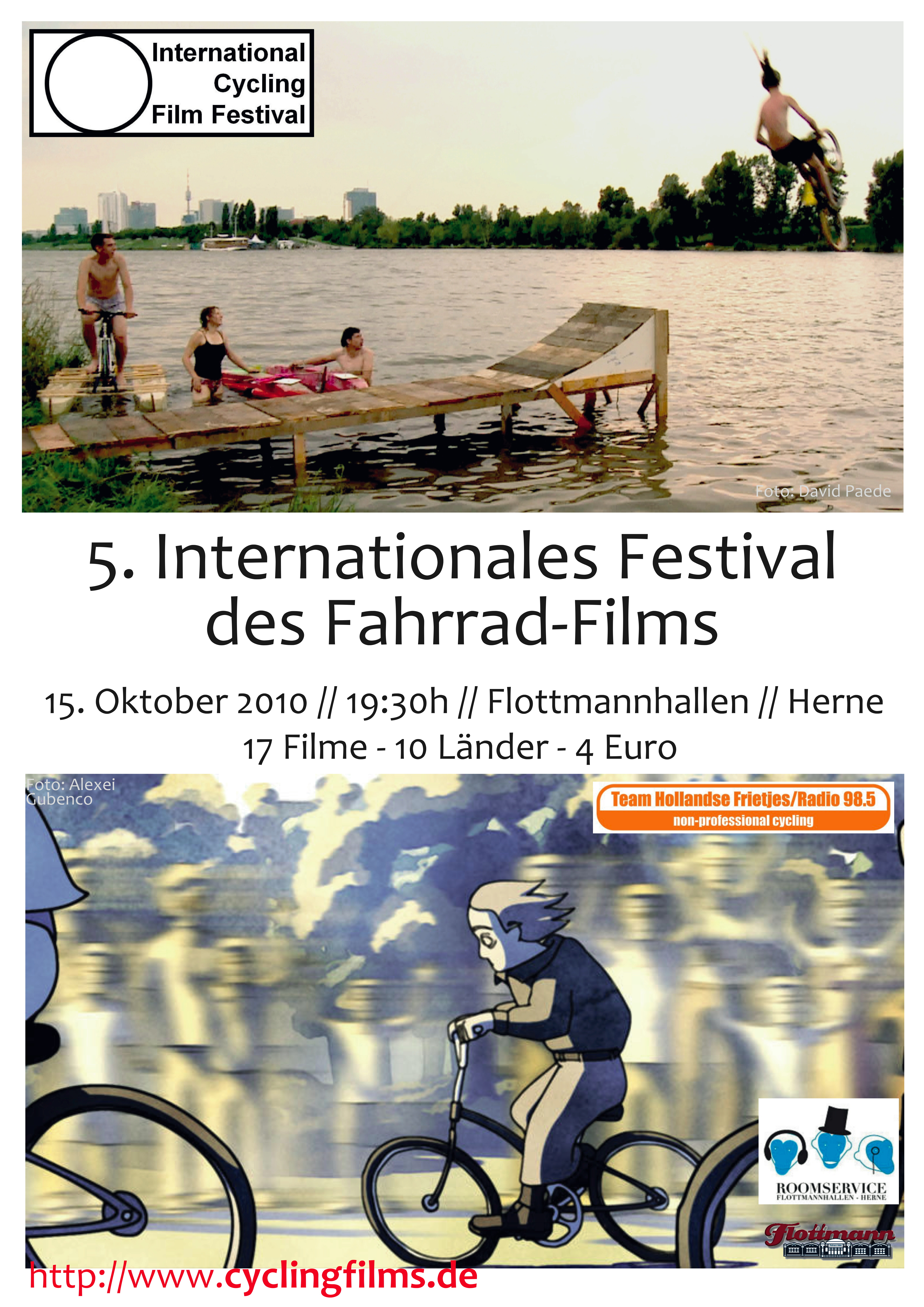
2010 Official festival poster

Polish-German movie maker Nena Adelajda Olczak wins the Goldenen Kurbel of the 16th ICFF in 2021 for Welcome to Polotubbieland. Things are sporty in Polotubbieland: dressed in Polish national colours, its inhabitants skilfully do cartwheels or ride around on the road bike. In contrast to the perfect world of fitness on the visual level, the film reveals on the soundtrack the abysses of contemporary Polish cultural politics, its radical break with artistic freedom and freedom of opinion in the name of the nation state. Populism leaves no room for the other, the foreign. "Dirty migrants go home" chant right-wing polotubbie artists in the bitter ending of the touching experimental film.

The Goldene Kurbel of the 13th ICFF was given to Tigersprung (Tiger leap), a film by Boaz Kaizman, Peter Rosenthal and Stefan Seibert about Albert Richter, 1932 amateur world champion on the track, murdered in 1940 by the German secret police Gestapo. At the center of the film is his Jewish manager, the Cologne-based Ernst Berliner, who, fleeing from the Nazis, survives the Nazi era in the Netherlands. He tries to prosecute the case in the 1960s, but the German judiciary refuses to open it. Also his former fellows in Cologne refuse him, "the disturbance”. Ernst Berliner travels home to the US with the intention to never return to Germany. “'Tigersprung' reminds us of the confrontation with Nazi sports history," so festival maker Gernot Mühge in his laudatory speech: "The film refers to what Ralph Giordano has called the second guilt of the Germans - the numerous gaps and failures in the efforts to confront the Nazi history".

Little Girl, an animation from Steven Subotnick, USA, was awarded with the Goldene Kurbel of the 12th ICFF. The short film is about a little girl, riding her bike in a bad mood. She puts fire to houses by ringing her bell. A weird hare tries to extinguish the flames, but finally the girl overwhelmed and dominated him. "Little Girl" is an ambiguous film in a gloomy atmosphere, and it does provide only few guidance to the viewer. The short plays artfully with the levels of imagination, symbols and reality, so the Jury Commission of the 12th ICFF.

The Goldene Kurbel of the 11th ICFF was given to Cycologic, a documentary about the power of women on bikes in Uganda, directed by Emilia Stålhammar, Veronica Pålsson and Elsa Lövdin, Sweden. The film was shot in Kampala, Uganda, in an absurd mess of mini vans and lorries; in this particular traffic the bicycle appears as a statement of social justice, equity and quality of life (not only) for African people. The film focusses on the political work of Amanda Ngabirano and other women for the creation of car free zones and bike lanes as well their promotion of women in cycling: “Seeing a woman riding a bicycle should not be seen as a sign of courage and fearlessness, but rather a sign of safe streets; and that should be the focus of the planning authorities”, so Amanda.

The winner of the 10th ICFF in 2015/2016 was Wytse Koetse for his film De Benen van Amsterdam, a portrait of Frans van der Meer, Amsterdam's most authentic bicycle repairmen. The film demonstrates that bicycles are the legs of Amsterdam, and by fixing bicycles Frans keeps the city running. Wytse Koetse's touching documentary shows Frans’ 90 years old workshop transforming the big city of Amsterdam into a village, where people need their bikes fixed for their daily life, they meet and provide mutual support.

2014 the Goldene Kurbel was given to The Bell from Pijus Mickus, Lithuania. The Bell is a film about a girl's dream of a cycle of her own, fulfilled by her loving parents. Since the bell does not ring the young owner starts her first ride to let the bell repaired. But the bike ride through the Lithuanian landscape appears difficult; the bicycle falls apart into pieces. Pijus Mickus' short shows powerfully expressive performance dance, with Indrė Pivoraitė and her bicycle as a congenial dance partner in the leading roles.

The prize for the best film 2013 was given to Three-Legged Horses from Felipe Bustos Sierra, Edinburgh, Scotland. His short shows an evening in the live of a professional cycle rickshaw driver, the friendly contacts with passersby, street musicians, colleagues, but also by the demanding fight against gravity, physical pain and nasty passengers. Referring to this contrast the film ends in a big brass party including the whole nightlife of Edinburgh. Three-Legged Horses shows the bright and dark site of professional bicycle driving, the fascination of free urban life, the solidarity among a modern precariat on the one hand, and on the other hand the vulnerability and toughness of this particular work life. The film won both Goldene Kurbel and audience award of the 8th ICFF.

Father and Daughter, a Dutch animation from Michaël Dudok de Wit was the Goldene Kurbel awardee in 2012. The metaphorical and touching film tells the story of a young girl, beginning with the goodbye of her father who leaves in a small boat. Over and over the girl took the bike to come back to the point where he left. This scene recurs for several stages of her life, i.e. as young woman cycling with her girlfriends, with her husband and children, as an elder woman, yet within her there is always a deep longing for her father. The compelling film won the audience award of the ICFF 2012, too.

The film prize 2011 was awarded to the American short Cycle of love by Catherine Marshall. It is the first contribution for the ICFF, within which bicycles play all parts in the film. The festival jury was positive about the amazing expressivity of Catherine Marshall's playing act bicycles, which was needed for the tragicomical love story of her film.

2010 the Goldene Kurbel was given to the Romanian artist Alexei Gubenco and his movie Vive La Crise!. The animation takes the economic and financial crisis as a starting point: "The short shows in an optimistic and satirical way the benefits of the cycle for both individuals and society, referring to the (as it were) anti-consumerism character of cycling", so the 2010th jury's comment.

The winner in 2009 was the German movie maker Jörn Staeger. His film Rad (English title: Wheel) is a short about a bizarre cycling trip under time pressure and against bicycle-specific obstacles: men, dogs, bike chains.

The 2008 prize winner was the movie maker Mike Tereba from Luxembourg for his contribution Psyclist, a gloomy feature film dedicated to a cyclist who was killed in a bicycle accident.

Winners of the Goldene Kurbel in previous years were the German movie maker Sören Büngener for his film A Look in the Mirror in 2007; a year earlier, in 2006, the Goldene Kurbel was awarded to the Austrian/German artists Sylvia Winkler und Stephan Köperl and their film doored in downtown.

== Grand Prize of the Jury ==
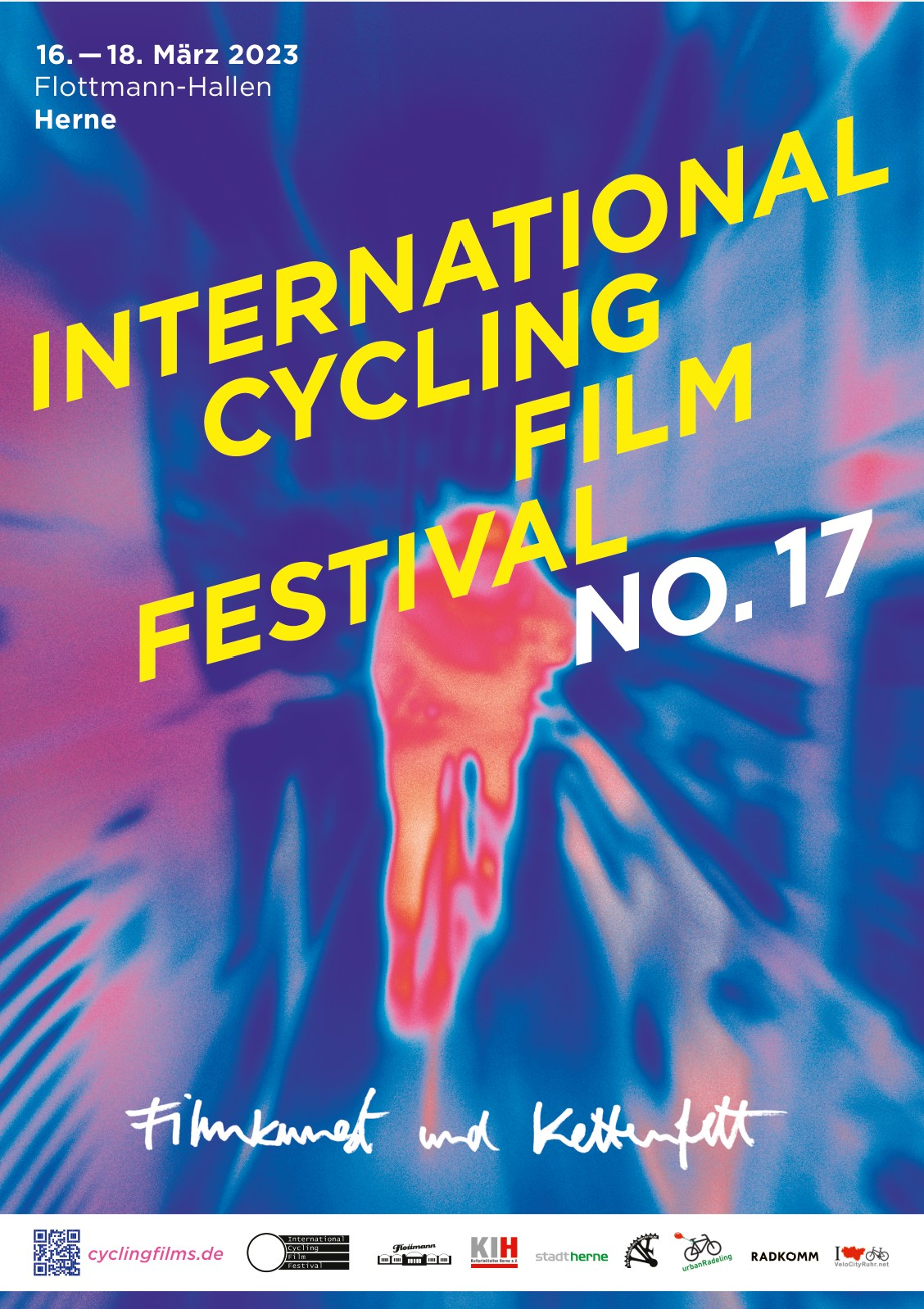
17th International Cycling Film Festival official poster

The Grand Prize of the Jury was introduced as a special film award for the runner-up to the Goldene Kurbel at the 12th ICFF in Herne, 2017. The award is the second-most prestigious prize of the festival after the Goldene Kurbel.

== Souvenir Albert Richter ==
The Souvenir Albert Richter was introduced at the 13th ICFF in 2018. Since then, it has been the festival's prize for the best road bike film. The award is dedicated to the German track cyclist Albert Richter, who belonged to the world's elite track sprinters in the 1930s. He was presumably murdered by the Gestapo in 1940. The Souvenir Albert Richter not only commemorates the cyclist, but above all the opponent and victim of National Socialist tyranny. The name of the price also refers to the Tour de France and its Souvenir Henri Desgrange.

The first Souvenir Albert Richter is won by the Belgian filmmaker Jasmijn Cedee for her experimental film "Toer".

== Table of awardees ==
	Goldene Kurbel		Grand Prize of the Jury		3rd	
Year	Movie maker	Film title	Movie maker	Film title	Movie maker	Film title
2026	(Hungary) Flóra Anna Buda	27	(France) Yannick Muller	Malo fait du vélo	(Netherlands) Thorn de Vries	Kutyuppen
2025	(Germany) Marius Schwingel, Nola Anwar, Janna Häcker	PLANTASIA	(Germany) Ella Knorz	Neun Tage im August	(Germany) Livia Giuliani	Cycling against ghosts
2024	(Switzerland) Jela Hasler	Über Wasser	(Germany) Levan Tzindsadze	Der Mann mit dem Fahrrad	(United States) Mairin Hart	Beyond the Binary
2023	(Israel) Tomer Shushan	White Eye	(Canada) Andrea Dorfman	There's a Flower in My Pedal	(Germany) Sarah Moll	What life should be about
2021	(Poland) (Germany) Nina Adelajda Olczak	Welcome to Polotubbieland	(Switzerland) Marjolaine Perreten	Le dernier jour d'automne	(Germany) Dagie Brundert	Die Selbstheilung meines Fahrrades
2019	(United States) Lauren Horoszewski	The Epiplectic Bicycle	(Canada) Jovan Harmuth	Cycle	(United States) Barry Keller	Smile
2018	(Germany) Boaz Kaizman, Peter Rosenthal, Stefan Seibert	Tigersprung	(Germany) Fritz Tietz	Der Langsamwallradfahrer	(Canada) François Fournier	Édouard
2017	(United States) Steven Subotnick	Little Girl	(Germany) Eric Jobs	Made in Langendreer	(United States) Amanda Zackem	Georgena Terry

	Goldene Kurbel		2nd		3rd	
Year	Movie maker	Film title	Movie maker	Film title	Movie maker	Film title
2016	(Sweden) Emilia Stålhammar, Veronica Pålsson, Elsa Lövdin	Cycologic	(Argentina) Manuel Becho Lo Bianco, Mariano Bergara	Inercia	(Canada) Matt Dennison	How to Make a Sick Edit
2015	(Netherlands) Wytse Koetse	De Benen van Amsterdam	(Spain) Jossie Malis	Bendito Machine IV – Fuel the Machines	(Germany) Romy Steyer	Friedensfahrer Lothar
2014	(Lithuania) Pijus Mickus	The Bell	(Germany) Michael Klöfkorn	ich fahre mit dem fahrrad in einer halben stunde an den rand der atmosphäre	(Israel) Amir Porat, Mor Israeli	Cycle
2013	(United Kingdom) Felipe Bustos Sierra	Three-Legged Horses	(Greece) Zina Papadopoulou, Petros Papadopoulos	Eight-Minute Deadline	(Germany) Mathias Eberle	Eingang-Klapprad-Style
2012	(Netherlands) Michaël Dudok de Wit	Father and Daughter	(United States) Marie Ullrich	Faster!	(Canada) The Deadly Nightshades	Fabric Bike
2011	(United States) Catherine Marshall	Cycle of love	(Portugal) José Pedro Lopes	O Risco	(Italy) Lorenzo Veracini, Nandini Nambiar, Marco Avoletta	A bicycle trip
2010	(Romania) Alexei Gubenco	Vive La Crise!	(Austria) (Germany) David Paede, Barbara Sas	Bikekitchen - a filmic approach	(Belgium) GRACQ	Duel dans le sul
2009	(Germany) Jörn Staeger	Rad	(United Kingdom) Adrian McDowell, Finlay Pretsell	Standing Start	(United Kingdom) Alistair Oldham	Bristol Bike Project
2008	(Luxembourg) Mike Tereba	Psyclist	(Italy) Antonio Poce	Coppi, un uomo solo	(Germany) Ingo Fucking	Karma Riders
2007	(Germany) Sören Büngener	A Look in the Mirror	(Germany) Holger Zepper	Vene voll?	(Austria) Thomas Ploder	Nach oben, wohin sonst?
2006	(Austria) (Germany) Sylvia Winkler, Stephan Köperl	doored in downtown	(Germany) Sören Büngener	Big Bang in Bayern	(United Kingdom) Chas Nairn	accomplish

== Table of winners of the award Souvenir Albert Richter ==
Year	Movie maker	Film title
2026	Johnny Yager (USA)	Le Tour
2025	Badoor Jbara, Tamar Unger (ISR)	One Vision
2024	Lewie Kloster, Noah Kloster (USA)	Le Tour de Pants with Ali Selim
2023	Andreas Scheffer (GER)	Jeden Sommer, im Juli
2021	Sabine Gilley (JEY)	Le Cannibale Parmi Les Coureurs
2019	Jonathan Pinkhard, Adam McConnachie (ZAF)	Pls Do Not Count This
2018	Jasmijn Cedee (BEL)	Toer

== Audience awards ==
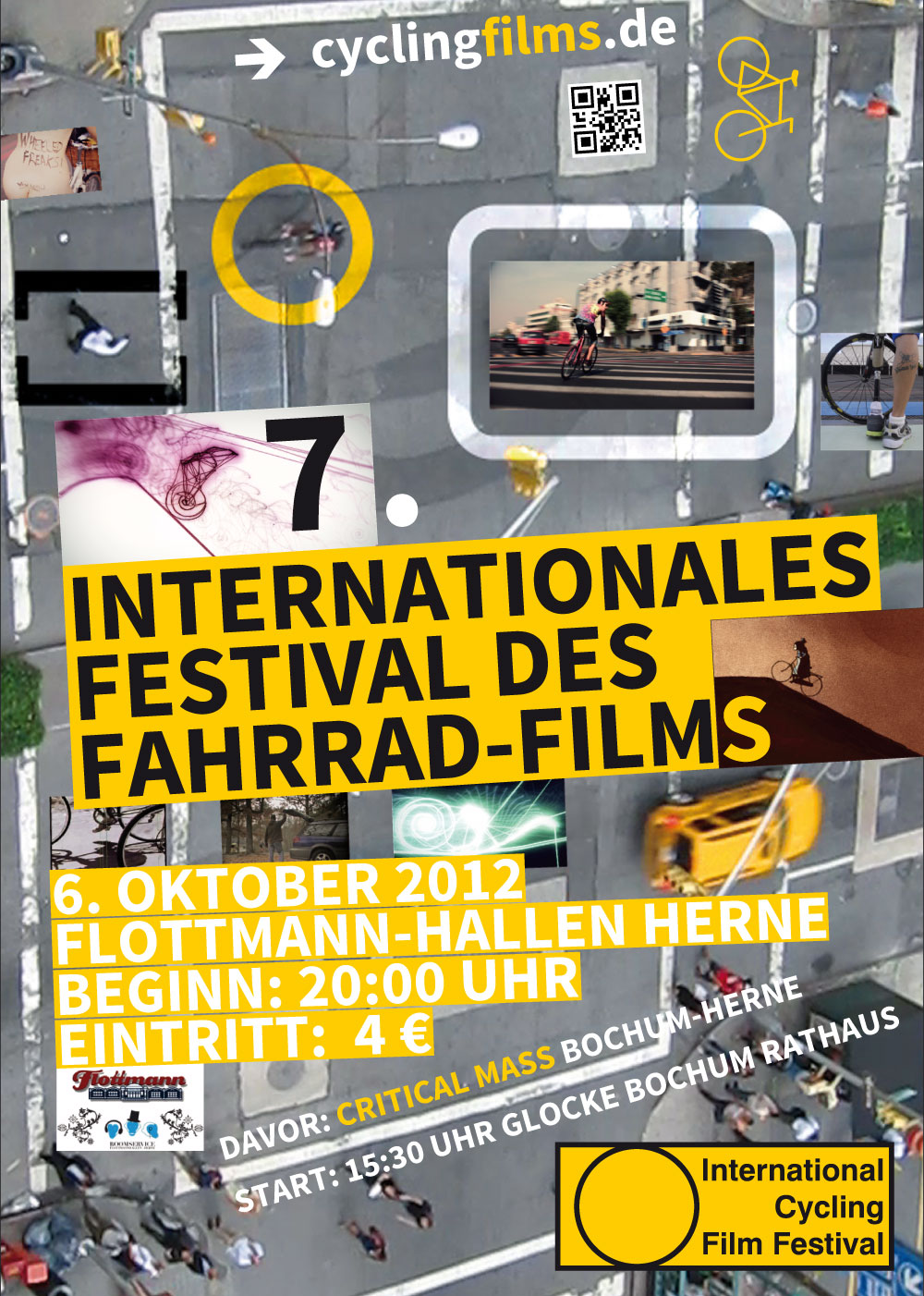
2012 Official festival poster

- Award of the Audience in Herne, 20th ICFF, 2026: Thorn de Vries, Netherlands, Kutyuppen
- Award of the audience in Herne, 19th ICFF, 2025: Livia Giuliani, Germany, Cycling against ghosts
- Award of the audience in Herne, 18th ICFF, 2024: Levan Tzindsadze, Germany, Der Mann mit dem Fahrrad
- Award of the audience in Herne, 17th ICFF, 2023: Tomer Shushan, White Eye
- Award of the audience in Herne, 16th ICFF, 2021: Marjolaine Perreten, Switzerland, Le dernier jour d'automne
- Award of the audience in Herne, 14th ICFF, 2019: Leibnitz-Gymnasium, Germany, Rad-Team Projektfilm
- Award of the audience in Herne, 13th ICFF, 2018: Melissa Schaust, Germany, On the Move
- Award of the audience in Herne, 12th ICFF, 2017: Eric Jobs, Germany, Made in Langendreer
- Award of the audience in Herne, 11th ICFF, 2016: Zenga Bros, Canada, Tall Bike Tour
- Trzy złote szprychy - Award of the audience in Kraków, 11th ICFF: Emilia Stålhammar, Veronica Pålsson, Elsa Lövdin, Sweden, Cycologic
- Award of the audience in Herne 2015: Lucas Camps, The Netherlands, Groen
- Trzy złote szprychy 2015 - Award of the audience in Kraków: Jabuk Ribicky, Poland, Baikal Ice Trip
- Trzy złote szprychy 2014 - Award of the audience in Kraków and Award of the audience in Herne 2014: Lea und Gregor Speth, Germany, Panamerican Childhood
- Award of the audience in Herne 2013: Felipe Bustos Sierra, UK, Three-Legged Horses
- Trzy złote szprychy 2013 - Award of the audience in Częstochowa: Konrad Lewandowski, Poland, Michał Kluska
- Audience award 2012: Michaël Dudok de Wit, The Netherlands Father and Daughter
- Audience award 2011: Beatrix Wupperman, Richard Grassick, Germany, UK: Beauty and the bike; Tom Malecha, Switzerland, Ten Things I Have Learned About Mountainbiking
- Audience award 2010: Timo Liedtke, Fiete Isfort, Germany: Robot
- Audience award 2009: Jörn Staeger, Germany, Rad
- Audience award 2007: Sören Büngener, Germany: A Look in the Mirror
- Audience award 2006: Andre Grunert, Peter Ittermann, Alles bon

== Honorable mentions ==
=== 20th ICFF, 2026 ===
- Biss auf den Schlauch, Marc Papenheim, Bochum: Best Vampire Film.

=== 16th ICFF 2021/2022 ===
- Ein RadEntscheid für Bochum, Christoph Bast, Myron Francis, Jörg Härterich and Kristin Schwierz, Germany: Best explanatory film.

=== 13th ICFF 2018/2019 ===
- Bike Ride, Tom Schroeder, USA: Best bicycle animation.

=== 12th ICFF 2017/2018 ===
- Bear, Nash Edgerton, USA: Best narrative short film.
- 14, Cyril Flous, Amélie Graffet, Charlotte Daros, Roxane Martinez, David Jurine, Juliette Coutellier, France: Best bicycle animation.
- Alfons V., Tobias Paul, Germany: Best folding bike film.

=== 11th ICFF 2016/2017 ===
- The Alley Cat, Marie Ullrich, USA: Best feature film. The Alley Cat is a continuation of Jasper's story, the bike messenger from the short film Faster!, which won 2nd place at the 7th ICFF. Marie Ullrich's touching feature film is again a road movie on a bike, focusing on Jasper's personal life.
- The folding bike group Klappradkollektiv Rakete Frankfurt won an Honorable Mention for their lifetime achievement, which contains a huge amount of surprising ideas, shedding light on various aspects of the folding bike sport.

=== 10th ICFF 2015/2016 ===
- Groen, Lucas Camps, Netherlands: Best bike comedy. A student, by bike and in a hurry, is detained by a group of pedestrians, waiting for a traffic light to turn green. The absurd situation evokes Vladimir and Estragon in Godot, but in a ticking thrill like Gary Cooper in High Noon.
- Ride, Coffus Hoffmann, Germany: Best feature film adaption by bike. Ride is a homage to Drive by Nicolas Winding Refn. The German actress Julia Rölle acts as a getaway driver on a fixed-gear bicycle, doing her job precisely and cold-bloodedly.
- Baikal Ice Trip, Paweł Wichrowski and Jabuk Ribicky, Poland: Best bike trip documentation. Baikal Ice Trip shows a bike holiday on Lake Baikal in the South of Siberia, in winter at minus 30 °C.
- Vorsprung durch Forschung, Klappradkollektiv Rakete Frankfurt, Germany: Best folding bike film. A tongue-in-cheek documentary about the advancements in folding bike race technology by the research and development center of Rakete Frankfurt.

=== 4th ICFF 2009 ===
- Wildbachtoni – Geschichte lebt by Richard Westermaier and Moses Wolf, Germany: Award for the bicycle in a supporting role.

== Competition Stefan Götz ==
Time trial "Stefan Götz" at the 2nd ICFF, Marbeck, Germany, September 2007

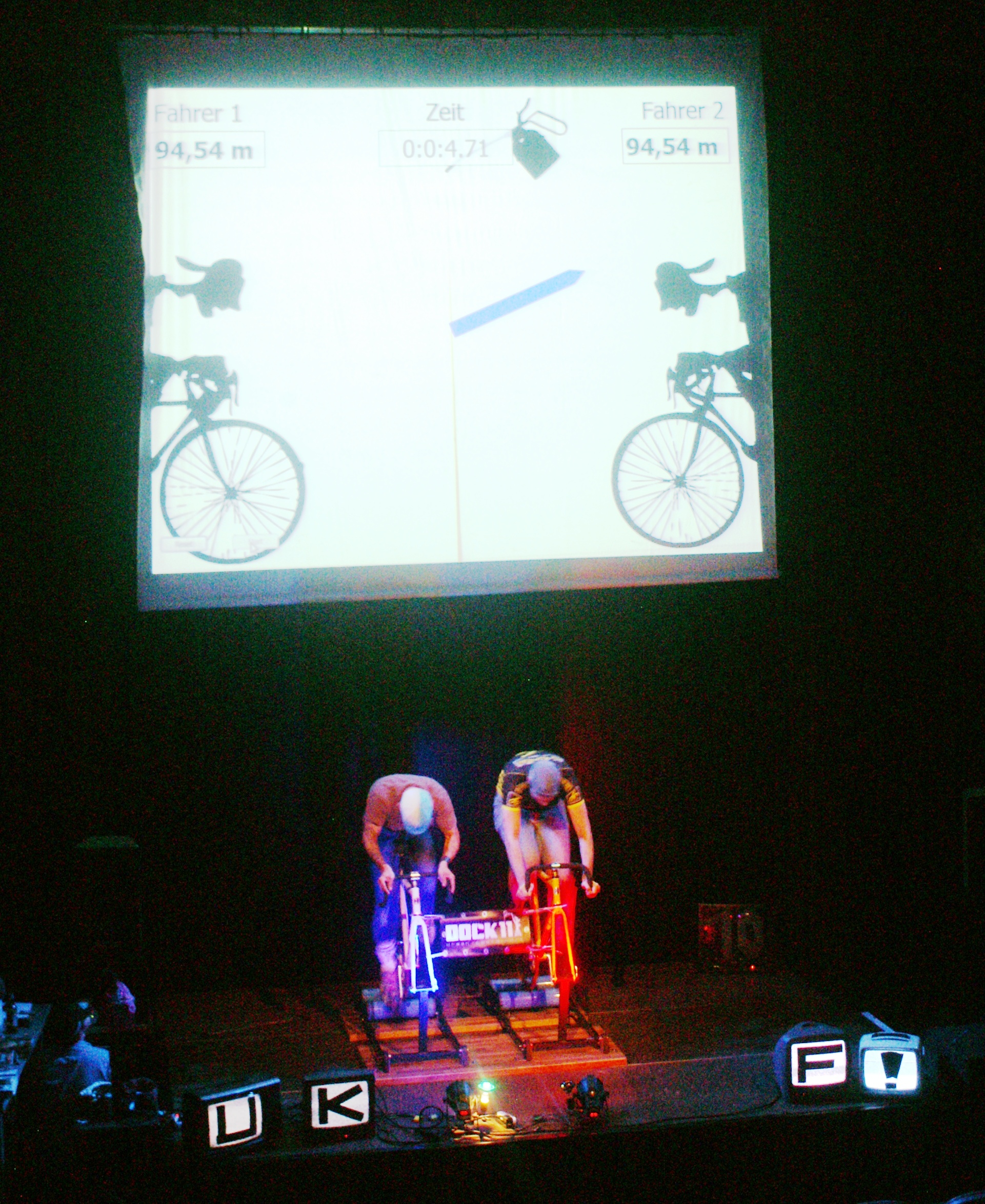
Goldsprint "Stefan Götz" at the 7th ICFF, 2012

The sporting "Competition Stefan Götz" marks the end of each German edition of the International Cycling Film Festival. It is named after the first sponsor of the Team Hollandse Frietjes.

In the first few years of the festival the Competition Stefan Götz took the form of an individual and team time trial over about 20 km, which was open to both audience and movie makers. 2009 the Competition Stefan Götz was a match sprint over about 800 metres, 2011 it was an Urban Cycle Polo match, 2012 a Goldsprint. From 2013 onwards it is a so-called Vinylsprint race, which is an invention of the ICFF makers.

=== Vinylsprint ===
Vinylsprint race at the 10th ICFF

The Vinylsprint is a variation of a Goldsprint race. It was invented by one of the makers of the ICFF, Patrick Praschma, and introduced at the 8th ICFF. Similar to the Goldsprint two stationary bicycles are its basis. The bicycles are coupled with belt-drive turntables: Pedaling the stationary bicycle operates a record player. Its tone arm is connected with a computer, and the stylus works as a speed sensor for the stationary bike. The racetrack is simulated by a video projection, both cyclists have to ride a similar virtual parkour on the cinema screen.

=== Winners of the Competition Stefan Götz ===
2019: Magnus Fischer, master of bicycle mechanics, Hildesheim

2018: Boris Weidtmann, Duisburg

2017: Christoph Lotz, lawyer, Bochum

2016: Philipp Todtberg, carpentry student, Dortmund

2015: Uwe Hermesmeier, board member ADFC Mönchengladbach, Mönchengladbach

2014 and 2013: Axel Rickel, bicycle salesman, Dortmund

2012: Pierre Cournoyer, performing artist at Roomservice, Herne

2011: Bike Polo Team "Champagneros", Duisburg

2009: Gernot Mühge, founding director of the ICFF, Bochum

2008: Thomas Wisiolek, amateur cyclist

2007: Rolf Trovato, amateur cyclist

2006: Holger Zepper, movie maker

== Guest performances ==
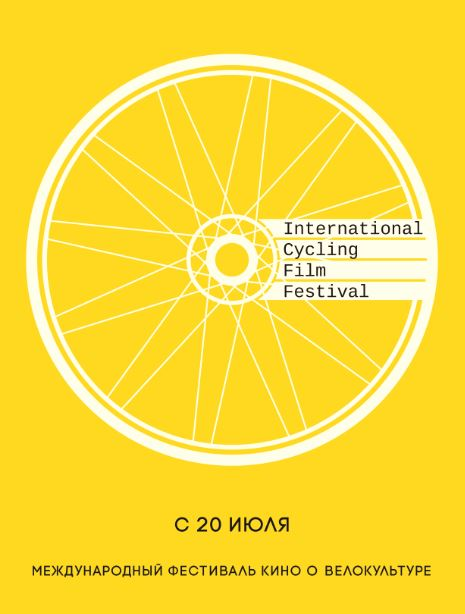
ICFF poster for the tour across Russia, 2017

Beside the fixed venues the ICFF gives numerous guest performances all over Europe. Basically the ICFF has got two concepts. First is a screening of the current program of the ICFF, i.e. in 2016/2017 the program of the 11th ICFF. Second and more often, the ICFF creates a tailor-made program in dialogue with the local people and organizers. The film selection is taken from the ICFF film archive that includes several hundred bike related short films. Based on this archive particular performances were developed in the past, like “Bike Animation Night”, “The Fantastic Bicycle Movie”, “Bike adventures”, “German Bike Shorts”.

The first guest performance of the ICFF took place in the German Museum for Sport and Olympics (German: Deutsches Sport & Olympia Museum), Cologne and in the Centennial Hall (German: Jahrhunderthalle Bochum) during the festival “Bicycle Summer of Industrial Culture”, in 2011.

In 2017 guest performances take place in several cities in Germany (Munich, Mainz, Wiesbaden, Hattingen and others), in France (Lille, Roubaix), in the Netherlands (Amersfoort), in Poland (Katowice and others) and in Belarus (Minsk). During summer 2017 the ICFF goes on tour across Russia, with an opening in Moscow in the Goethe Institut and the Embassy of Germany, Moscow and venues in St. Petersburg, Yekaterinburg and others.

== Reception ==
No one has yet approached the subject of cycling in such an entertaining, amusing and aesthetically pleasing manner.

— Birgit Emnet, article in Wiesbadener Kurier

== See also ==
- Bicycle Film Festival
- List of films about bicycles and cycling
