= Lucas Brunelle =

American photographer

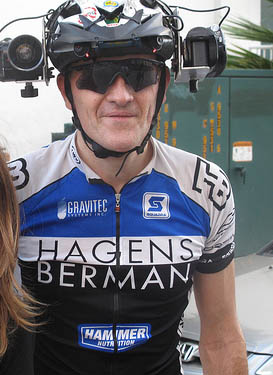
- Lucas Brunelle with helmet cameras
- Born: August 3, 1971; Boston
- Occupation: Bicycle videographer

Lucas Brunelle is an American videographer of bicycle stunts and races.

== Early life and bicycling ==
Lucas Brunelle was raised on Martha's Vineyard in Massachusetts where he attended Martha's Vineyard Regional High School. He began his bicycle career, riding BMX bikes at 15 years old. He is a veteran cyclist, traveling extensively to attend alleycat races around the world. He is also well known for his YouTube channel, where he publishes videos detailing his rides, races, and thoughts on cycling.

From 1990 he attended the University of Massachusetts Amherst.

He has couriered, had his own small business, and messaged for his clients.

== Videography and advocacy ==
Brunelle's videos have been featured in the Bicycle Film Festival, the International Cycling Film Festival and are made available online. Many bicycle forums regularly link to his newest films.

Brunelle has participated in several Critical Mass events in the Boston area. Some of the stunts he has been involved in include a bicycle-drawn carriage for a wedding, and parading a live band through the streets of downtown on a 1000 lb bicycle supported stage.

== Controversy ==
Lucas Brunelle riding a bike on the Great Wall of China

Brunelle is known for his dangerous riding style, which has led to some tension with other riders, and with authorities.. In February 2021, Brunelle and a companion were riding the Charles River in Boston when the companion fell through the ice, which gained national attention for a few days. Brunelle went onto the frozen Charles river again the next week

In November 2014, Brunelle was involved in a traffic crash on Tremont Street near Boston Common. While running a red light, he struck a pedestrian, causing injury. He was then involved in an altercation with a taxi driver immediately following the incident with the pedestrian. Brunelle hailed the taxi driver for help, and the driver then physically attacked Brunelle, and attempted to run the cyclist over when Brunelle stood in front of the cab to prevent the driver from fleeing the scene.

Brunelle maintains a YouTube channel. In 2017 he posted a video of a member of his group crashing into and knocking a driver off an idle motorcycle on a roadway in France and a foot chase by the angry driver trying to catch up to the cyclist persistently It is said in the description that this is why he "isn't allowed there anymore".
