= Century Road Club Association =

Century Road Club Association (CRCA) is a not-for-profit volunteer-run organization founded in 1898 that hosts a variety of cycling events in the New York City area, including a free year-round coaching program, the CRCA Club Series of races in Central Park, and other road cycling races, including the Grant's Tomb Criterium, Orchard Beach Criterium, Bear Mountain Classic, Dave Jordan Classic, and the Fort Lee Criterium. The CRCA is the oldest bicycle club in the United States.
