= Bicycle Film Festival =

Film festival

The Bicycle Film Festival
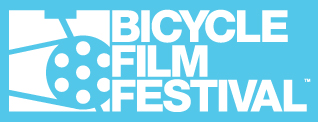
- Location: New York City, United States
- Founded: 2001
- Founded by: Brendt Barbur
- Language: English
- Website: Official Festival Website

The Bicycle Film Festival (BFF) is an independent film festival that screens films related to urban cycling culture, in cities around the world. It was founded in 2001 and is based in New York.

== History ==
In 2001 Brendt Barbur was hit by a bus while riding his bicycle in New York City. Insisting on turning this negative experience into a positive one, Barbur created the Bicycle Film Festival as a platform to celebrate bicycles through music, art and film. The first event was in New York, and cycling aficionados in other cities soon wanted to replicate it for their own communities. As at 2012, the festival had taken place in more than 50 cities in North America, Europe and Asia.

The festival, which is non-juried, now attracts submissions by independent directors from around the world. In New York, it is held annually in the prestigious Anthology Film Archives.

The Bicycle Film Festival has been a significant catalyst for the urban bike movement. It has provided a platform for many bicycle advocates and filmmakers to premiere both shorts and feature-length films that otherwise may not have seen a wide release, and its growth has been linked to the emergence of the cycle chic movement.

== Events ==
The Bicycle Film Festival typically spans 3–4 days in each city, showing up to 30 films. Screenings encompass diverse aspects of urban cycling and a variety of genres and are tailored to each city.

An art exhibition, the Joyride Art Show, often accompanies events, displaying artworks related to cycling. To date, it has featured sculpture by Tom Sachs and photography by Albert Maysles.

Bikes Rock!, a concert to launch the festival, has previously featured acts including Blonde Redhead, Jon Spencer Blues Explosion, Dan Deacon, No Age, Peaches, Matt and Kim, and Deerhunter.

== Contributors ==
Filmmakers whose work has been featured in, or who have otherwise contributed to, the Bicycle Film Festival include: Mike Mills, Spike Jonze, Jorgen Leth, Lucas Brunelle, the Neistat Brothers, Alex Craig and Peter Sutherland.

== See also ==
- International Cycling Film Festival
- List of films about bicycles and cycling
